= Detroit =

Most populous city in Michigan, United States

- City
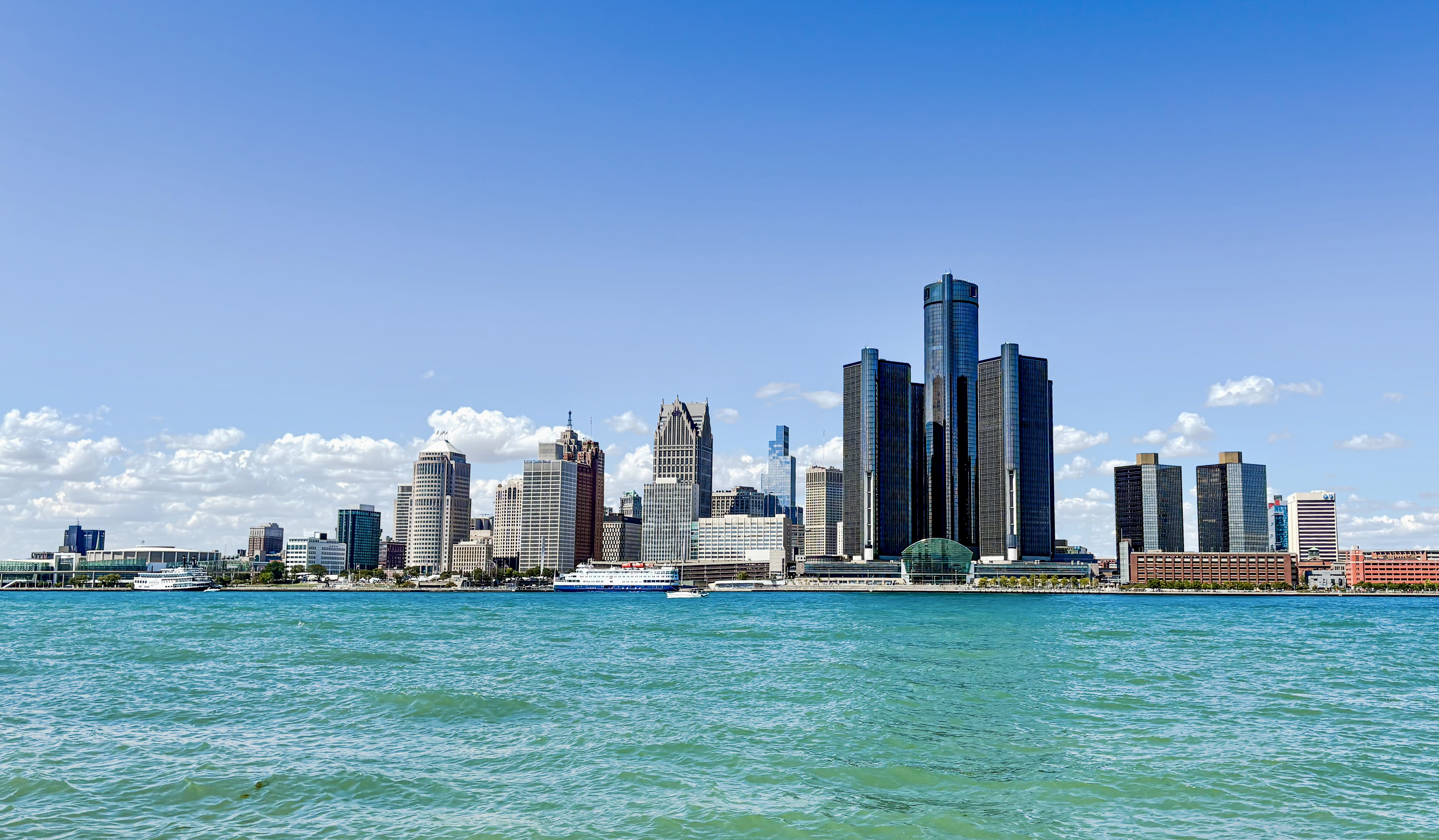
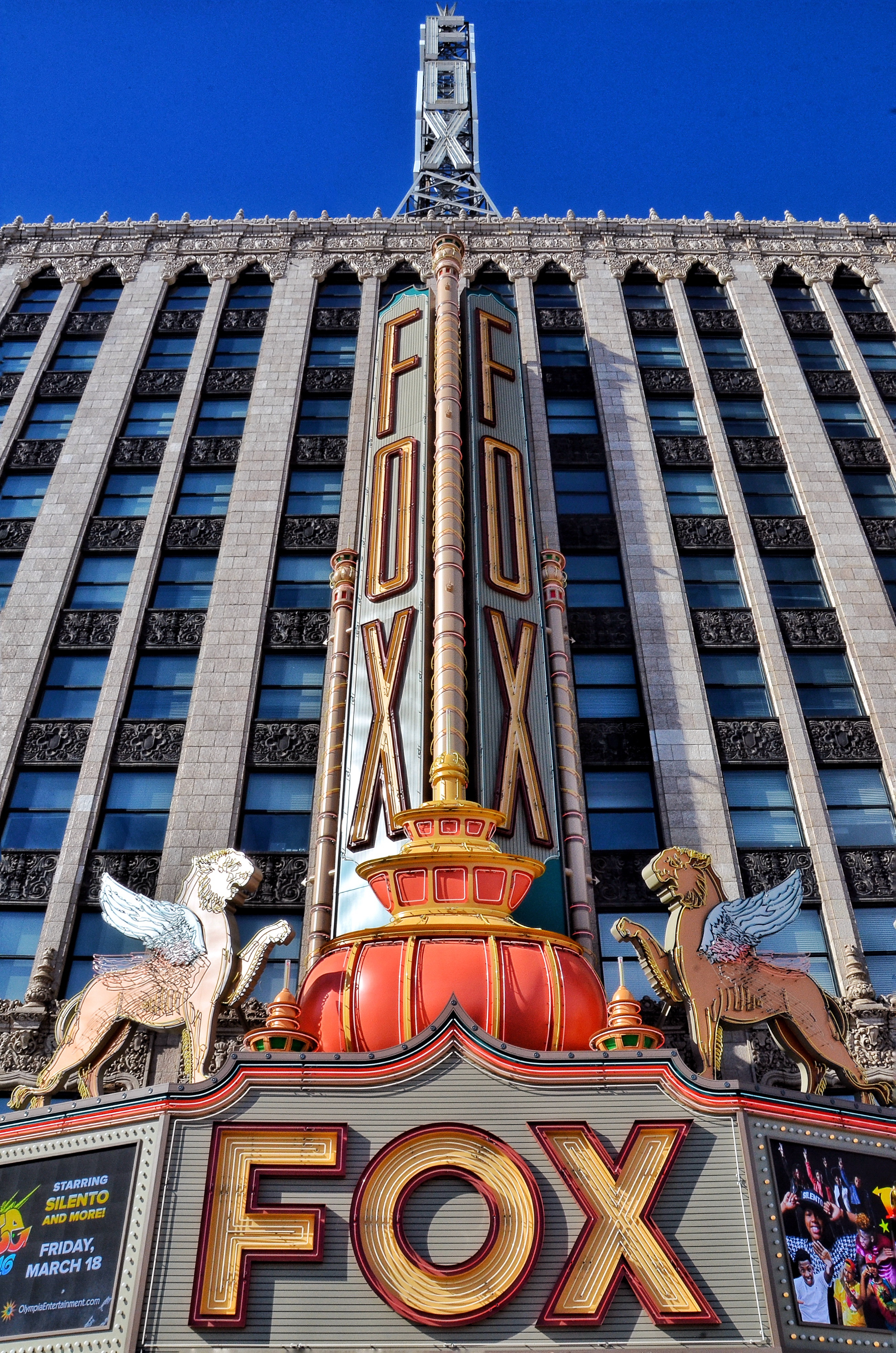
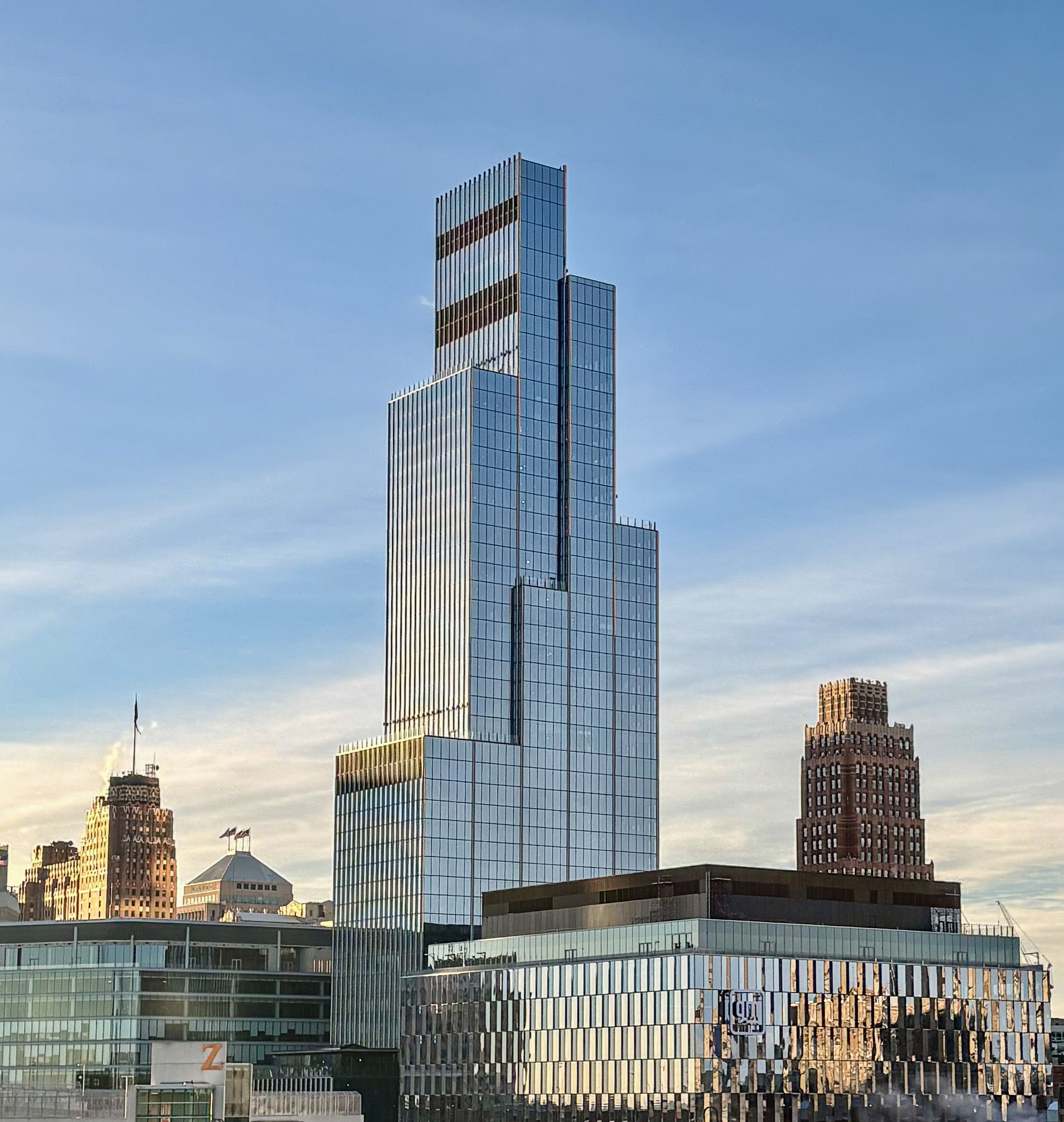
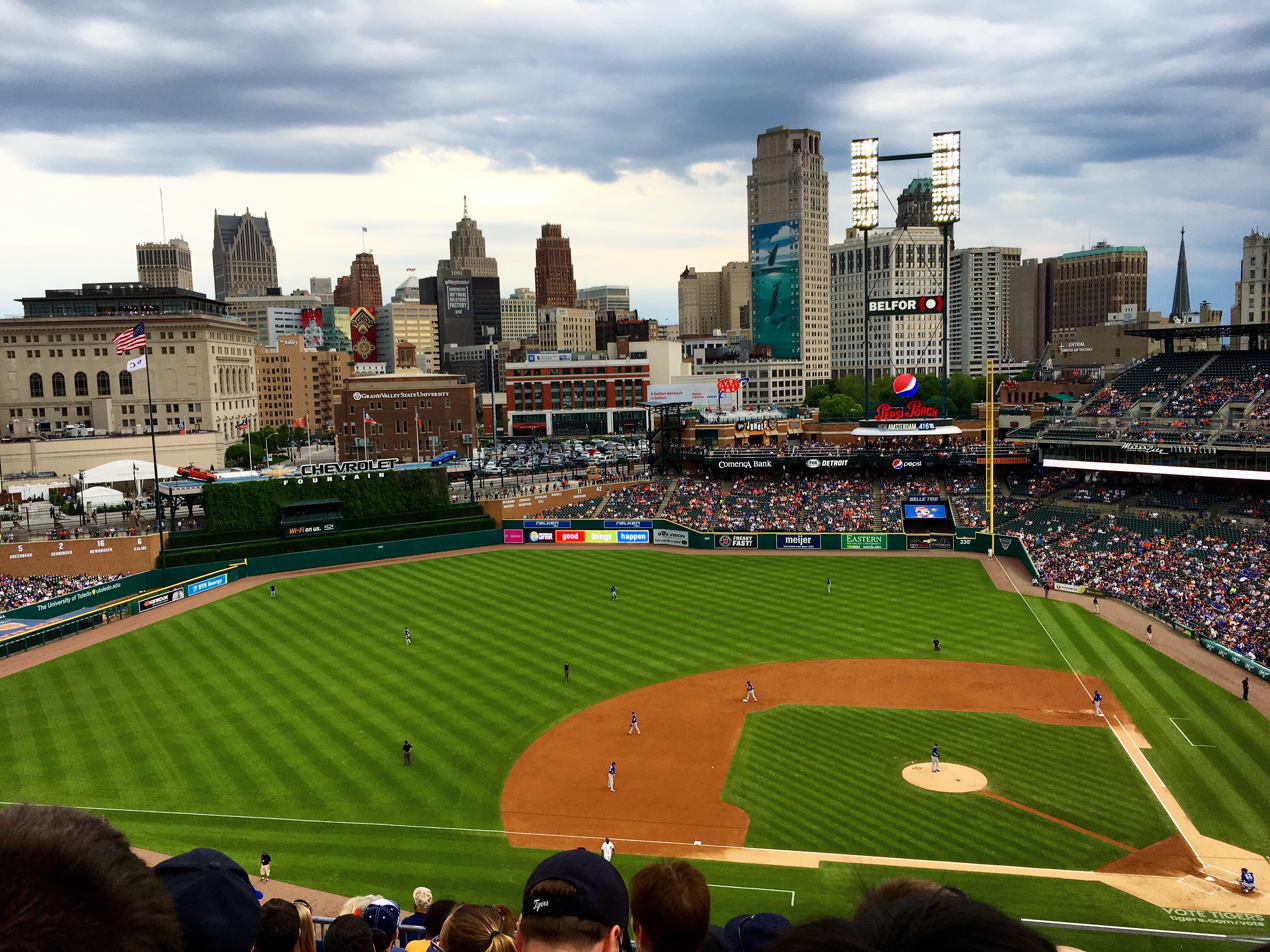
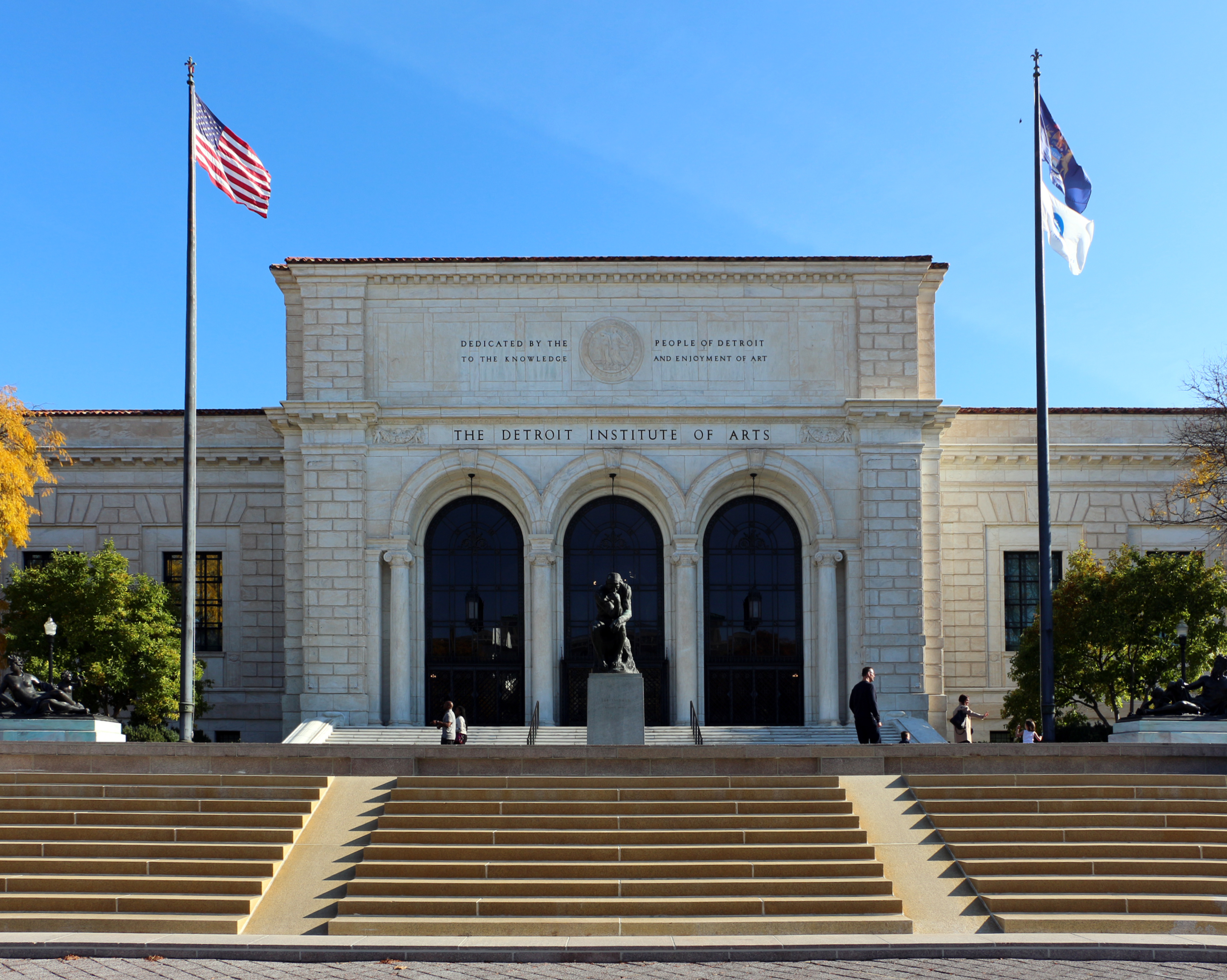
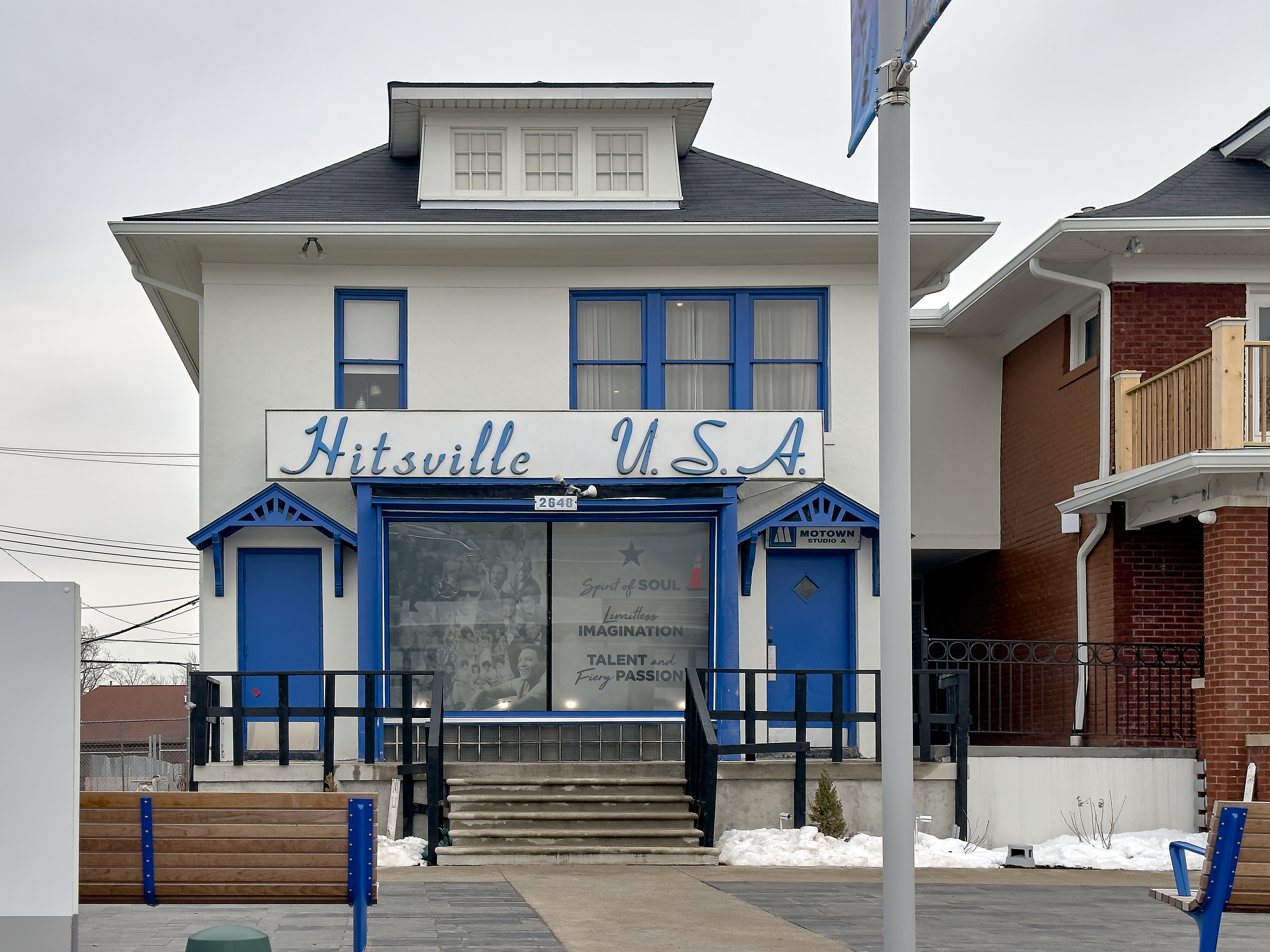
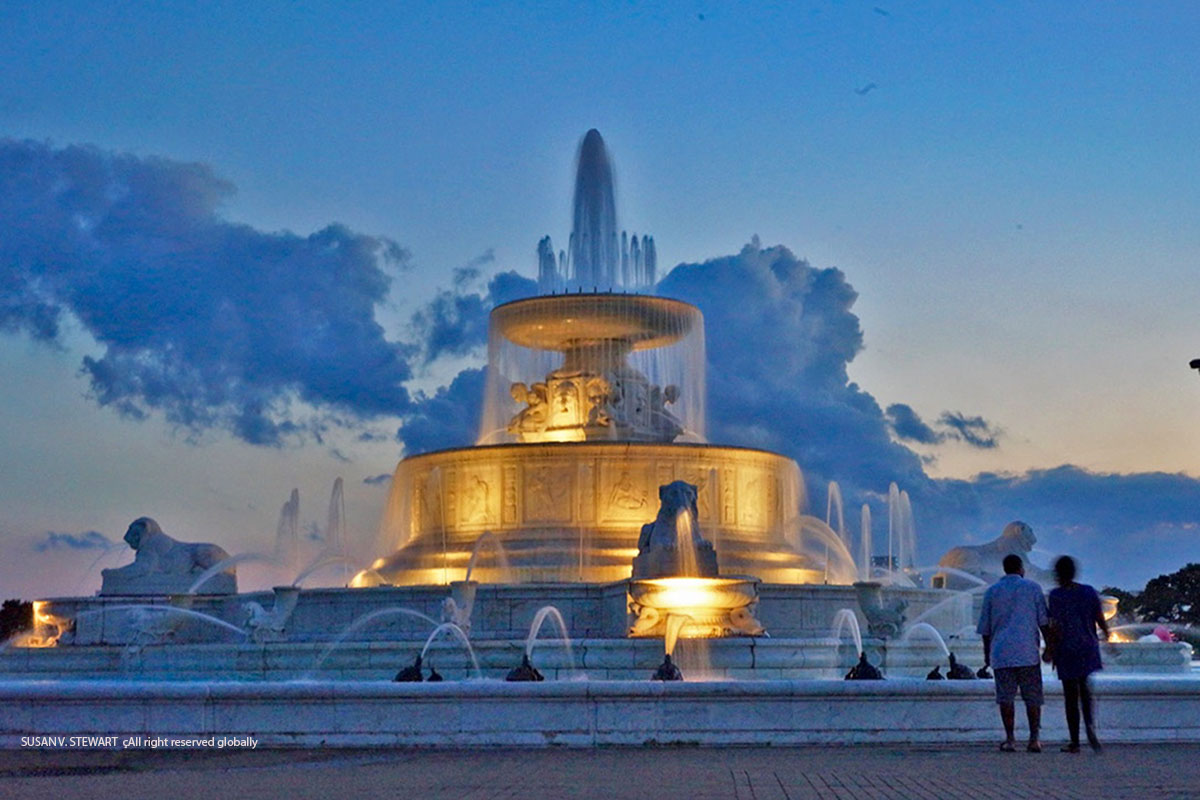
- Downtown Detroit skyline with the Renaissance Center in the foreground Fox Theatre Detroit River Hudson's Detroit Comerica Park Detroit Institute of Arts Hitsville U.S.A. Belle Isle Park

- Flag Seal Logo
- Etymology: French: détroit (strait)
- Nicknames: The Motor City, Motown, and others
- Motto: Speramus Meliora; Resurget Cineribus (Latin: We Hope For Better Things; It Shall Rise From the Ashes)
- Interactive map of Detroit
- Location within Michigan Location within the United States
- Coordinates: 42°19′54″N 83°2′45″W
- Country: United States
- State: Michigan
- County: Wayne
- Founded (Fort Detroit): July 24, 1701
- Incorporated: September 13, 1806
- Founded by: Antoine de la Mothe Cadillac (1658–1730) & Alphonse de Tonty (1659–1727)
- Named for: Detroit River

Government
  - Type: Strong Mayor
  - Body: Detroit City Council
  - Mayor: Mary Sheffield (D)
  - Clerk: Janice Winfrey
  - City council: Members: Mary D. Waters – At Large; Coleman Young II – At Large; James Tate – District 1 Northwest; Angela Calloway – District 2 Near Northwest; Scott Benson – District 3 Northeast; Latisha Johnson – District 4 Far East Side; Renata Miller – District 5 Central-Near East Side; Gabriela Santiago-Romero – District 6 Southwest; Denzel McCampbell – District 7 West Side

Area
  - City: 142.89 sq mi (370.09 km^{2})
  - Land: 138.73 sq mi (359.31 km^{2})
  - Water: 4.16 sq mi (10.78 km^{2})
  - Urban: 1,284.8 sq mi (3,327.7 km^{2})
  - Metro: 3,888 sq mi (10,071 km^{2})
- Elevation: 597 ft (182 m)

Population (2020)
  - City: 639,111
  - Estimate (2025): 649,095 ▲
  - Rank: 73rd in North America; 26th in the United States; 1st in Michigan
  - Density: 4,606.8/sq mi (1,778.71/km^{2})
  - Urban: 3,776,890 (US: 12th)
  - Urban density: 2,940/sq mi (1,135/km^{2})
  - Metro: 4,400,578 (US: 14th)
- Demonym: Detroiter

GDP
  - Metro: $331.333 billion (2023)
- Time zone: UTC−5 (EST)
  - Summer (DST): UTC−4 (EDT)
- ZIP Codes: 482XX: 48201–48240, 48242-48244, 48255, 48260, 48264-48269, 48272, 48275, 48277-48279, 48288
- Area code: 313
- FIPS code: 26-22000
- GNIS feature ID: 1617959
- Website: detroitmi.gov

Detroit (/dɪˈtrɔɪt/ dih-TROYT, locally also /ˈdiːtrɔɪt/ DEE-troyt) (Note: From French Le Détroit [lə detʁwa], literally 'The Strait'.) is the most populous city in the U.S. state of Michigan. It is situated on the bank of the Detroit River across from the Canadian city of Windsor, Ontario. It is the 26th-most populous city in the United States and the largest U.S. city on the Canada–United States border, with a population of 639,111 at the 2020 census, and an estimated 2025 population of 649,095, its first population increase since 1950. The Metro Detroit area, at over 4.4 million people, is the 14th-largest metropolitan area in the nation and second-largest in the Midwest (after the Chicago metropolitan area). The county seat of Wayne County, Detroit is a significant cultural center known for its contributions to music, art, architecture, and design, in addition to its historical automotive and industrial background.

In 1701, French explorers Antoine de la Mothe Cadillac and Alphonse de Tonty founded Fort Pontchartrain du Détroit. During the late 19th and early 20th centuries, it became an important industrial hub at the center of the Great Lakes region. The city's population rose to be the fourth-largest in the nation by 1920, with the expansion of the automotive industry in the early 20th century. One of its main features, the Detroit River, became the busiest commercial hub in the world. In the mid-20th century, Detroit entered a state of urban decay that has continued to the present, as a result of industrial restructuring, the loss of jobs in the auto industry, and rapid suburbanization. Since reaching a peak of 1.85 million at the 1950 census, Detroit's population has declined by more than 65 percent. In 2013, Detroit became the largest U.S. city to file for bankruptcy, but successfully exited in 2014. In 2025, the U.S. Census Bureau reported that Detroit's population grew for a second consecutive year and led population growth in Michigan for the first time since the 1950s.

Detroit is a port on the Detroit River, one of the four major straits that connect the Great Lakes system to the St. Lawrence Seaway. The city anchors the third-largest regional economy in the Midwest and the 16th-largest in the United States. It is also best known as the center of the U.S. automotive industry, and the "Big Three" auto manufacturers—General Motors, Ford, and Stellantis North America (Chrysler)—are all headquartered in Metro Detroit. Metro Detroit houses the Detroit Metropolitan Airport, one of the most important hub airports in the United States. Detroit and the adjacent Canadian city of Windsor constitute the second-busiest international crossing in North America, after San Diego–Tijuana.

Detroit's culture is marked with diversity, having both local and international influences. Detroit gave rise to the music genres of Motown and techno, and also played an important role in the development of jazz, hip-hop, rock, and punk. As a result of the city's rapid growth in its boom years, Detroit has many globally unique architectural monuments and historic places. Since the 2000s, conservation efforts have managed to save many architectural pieces and achieve several large-scale revitalizations, including the restoration of several historic theaters and entertainment venues, high-rise renovations, new sports stadiums, and a riverfront revitalization project. Detroit is an increasingly popular tourist destination which caters to about 16 million visitors per year. In 2015, Detroit was designated a "City of Design" by UNESCO, the first and only U.S. city to receive this designation.

== Etymology and nicknames ==
Detroit is named after the Detroit River, connecting Lake St. Clair with Lake Erie. The name comes from the French language word détroit meaning 'strait' as the city was situated on a narrow north–south passage of water linking the two lakes. The river was known as le détroit du Lac Érié in the French language, which means 'the strait of Lake Erie'. In historical contexts, the strait included Lake St. Clair and the Detroit River.

Throughout its history, Detroit has been known by several nicknames. Its founder, Antoine de la Mothe Cadillac, originally envisioned the settlement as a major city within the Pays d'en Haut, calling it the Paris de la Nouvelle-France, (Paris of New France). As the city evolved into the world's automotive center, "Detroit" became a metonym for the industry itself. Its status as the heart of the automotive world is reflected in the nickname Motor City, while its deep musical legacy is famously celebrated through the moniker Motown.

Other nicknames emerged during the 20th century to reflect different aspects of the city's identity. It became known as the City of Champions in the 1930s following a series of sports successes, while the Detroit Red Wings later trademarked the name Hockeytown. In more recent years, it has been called the Renaissance City, a nod to its urban revitalization efforts and the iconic Renaissance Center complex. The city is also frequently referred to as The D, The 313 (its telephone area code), (Note: Commemorated in the movie 8 Mile (2002)) or Rock City, inspired by the Kiss song "Detroit Rock City."

== History ==
=== Indigenous history ===
The Detroit River basin was inhabited by Paleo-Indian hunter-gatherers as early as 11,000 years ago, followed by successive ancient cultures, including Woodland mound-building societies. By the time of European contact, the region was a dynamic borderland inhabited by various Iroquoian and Anishinaabe nations. In the Ojibwe language, the area is called Waawiiyaataanong, which translates to "where the river bends" or "where the water curves around".

=== French era (1701–1760) ===
The first Europeans to explore the Detroit River basin were the members of a French expedition led by explorer Adrien Joliet, brother of Louis Jolliet, in 1669. Joliet was commissioned by Jean Talon, the first Intendant of New France, to lead an official mission to investigate rumors of rich copper deposits around Lake Superior; they traveled down through the Detroit River in September 1669. French Sulpician priests François Dollier de Casson and René de Bréhant de Galinée explored and mapped the region in 1670 for the French Crown, leaving written accounts of the area. The first documented sailing ship navigation on the upper Great Lakes occurred in 1679, when René-Robert Cavelier, Sieur de La Salle sailed Le Griffon up into the Detroit River.

The Cadillac expedition of 1701 was a pivotal event in the history of Detroit, resulting in the establishment of a fortified settlement named Fort Pontchartrain du Detroit on July 24, 1701, and the foundation of the parish of Sainte-Anne de Detroit in the settlement on July 26. Cadillac was authorized by King Louis XIV of France and his minister, Louis Phélypeaux, Comte de Pontchartrain, to further French colonial influence and secure the French trade in the region. He offered free land to French families in Quebec to settle into the region and encouraged the Indigenous tribes to relocate around it. The modern city of Detroit grew out of this 18th-century French settlement.

During the French and Indian War, Fort Pontchartrain was largely unaffected and had not been besieged in the war, though it was a crucial logistic post for the French war effort. Following French defeat and the signing of the Treaty of Paris in 1763, Detroit, together with much of the French territories east of the Mississippi River, was ceded to Great Britain. The Indigenous tribes, stripped of their French allies, faced aggressive British expansion, leading to Pontiac's Rebellion.

=== British era (1760–1796) ===
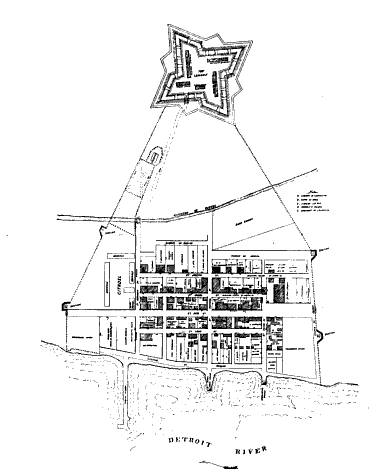
A topographical plan of the town of Detroit prior to the Great Fire of 1805, depicting the British bastion fort of Lernoult (above) and the French era buildings of Fort Pontchartrain du Détroit (below).

Following the acquisition of Detroit, the British sought to mitigate further conflict with Indigenous tribes after Chief Pontiac's failed attempt to seize the settlement in 1763. In the wake of these negotiations, the British issued the Royal Proclamation of 1763, establishing a buffer zone that restricted European settlement south of the Great Lakes and west of the Appalachian Mountains.

The fur trade remained the bedrock of Detroit's economy under British rule, positioning the settlement as a vital conduit for goods moving between Montreal and the expanding western frontier. Both large trading companies and independent merchants moved in to occupy former French trade routes. While the Montreal-based North West Company deployed voyageurs across the region, local independent firms formed the Miamis Company in 1786 as a short-lived conglomerate to pool resources and compete. Meanwhile, the Michilimackinac Company heavily influenced northern supply lines.

Slavery was a persistent practice in Detroit's British and French eras, though it never reached the scale seen on Southern plantations. Enslaved people typically made up less than 10 percent of the population, often brought from East Coast colonies to serve in the homes or on the farms of prominent residents. While the Northwest Ordinance largely prohibited slavery once Michigan became a free U.S. territory, legal loopholes protected existing holdings. This was solidified by the 1807 Denison v. Tucker ruling, in which Chief Justice Augustus B. Woodward decreed that those enslaved before American control would remain so for life. The Denison family fled to Canada with assistance of abolitionists to secure their freedom following the verdict, serving as a precursor to the Underground Railroad in the mid-19th century.

Though the 1783 Treaty of Paris formally ceded Detroit to the United States, and the Northwest Territory was established in 1787, British forces remained in the region for another decade. Border disputes persisted until 1796, when the British finally withdrew following the ratification of the Jay Treaty.

=== Early American era to Gilded Age (1796–1890) ===
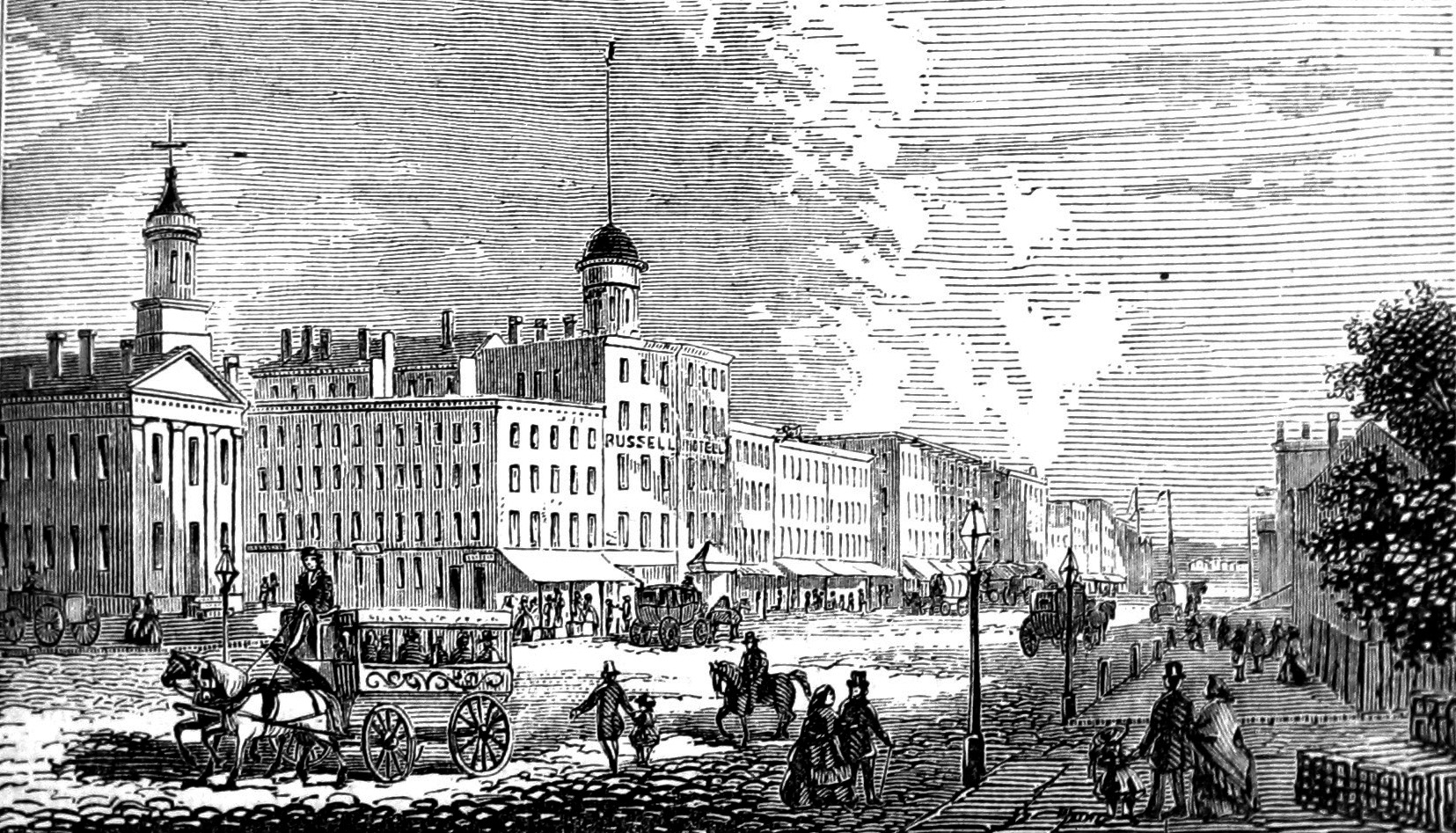
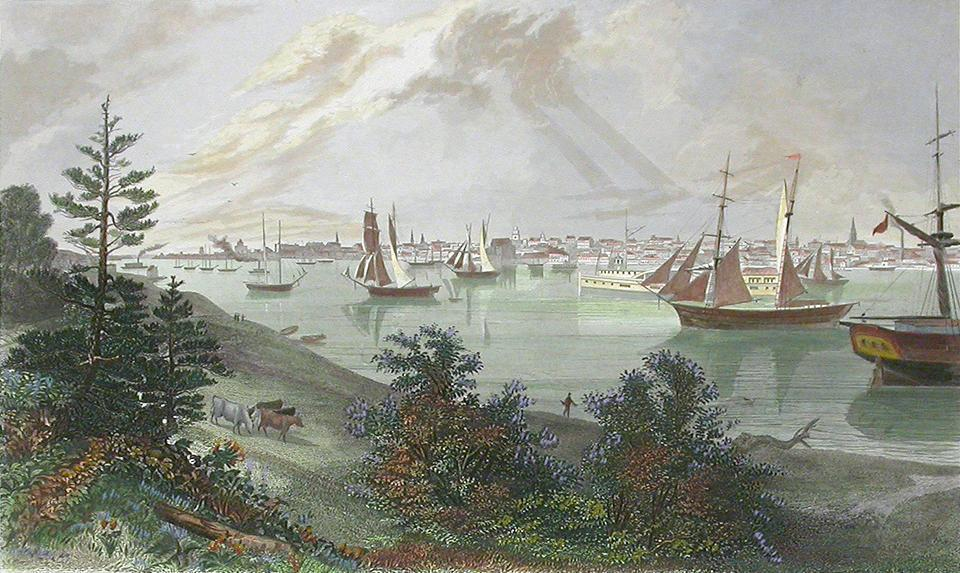
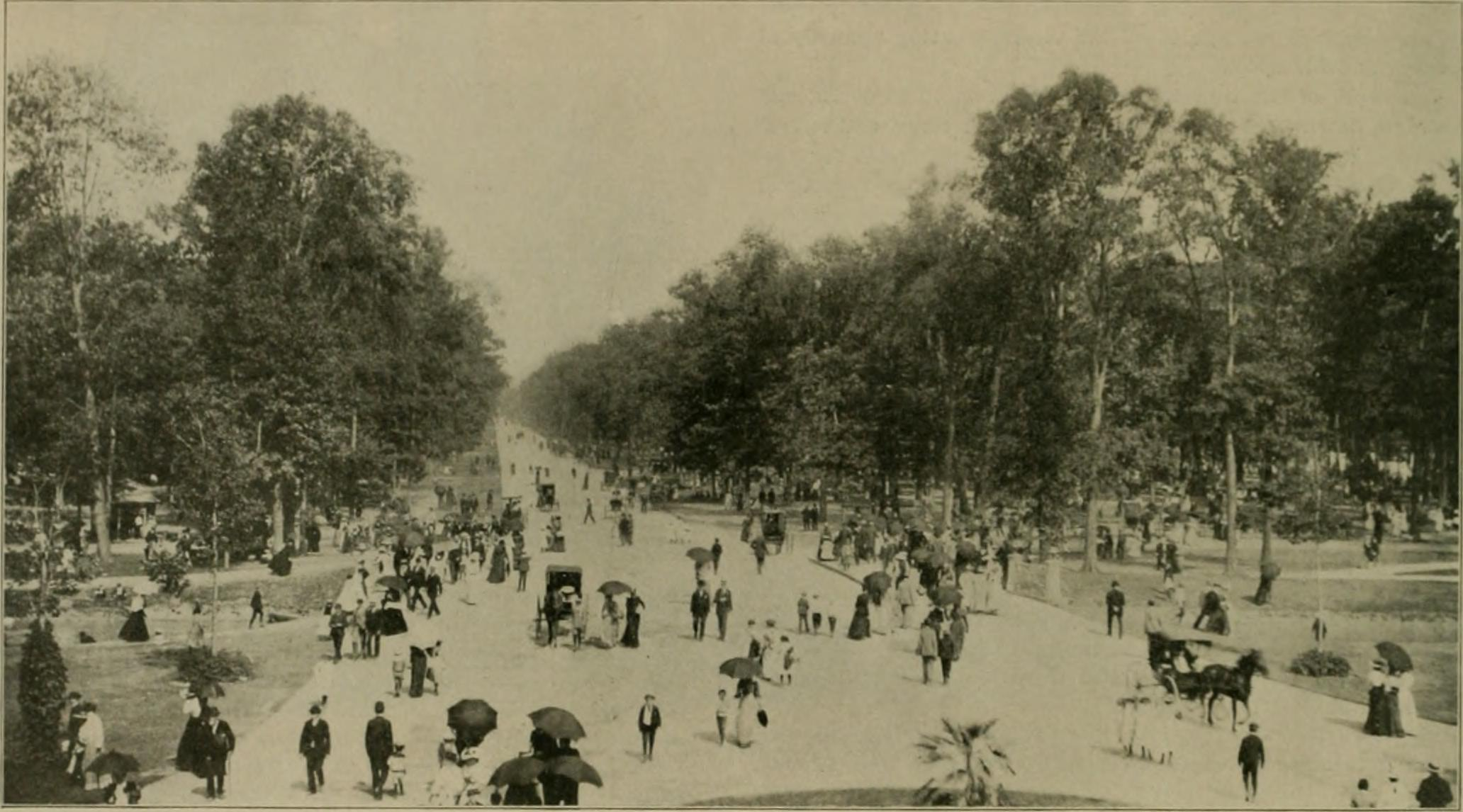
From top: Woodward Avenue shopping district in 1865; The City of Detroit (from Canada Shore), 1872, by A. C. Warren; the Belle Isle Park in 1891

After the Great Fire of 1805 destroyed nearly all of Detroit's colonial buildings, the town was quickly rebuilt with aid from both local residents and those from Quebec. The town of Detroit was first incorporated as a city in 1806, but the incorporation was repealed just three years later. Detroit was captured after the Siege of Detroit and was occupied by the British, during the War of 1812, until it was liberated in 1813. It was reincorporated in 1815 following the war. In 1824, the city held its first mayoral election, with John R. Williams becoming the first elected mayor. Following Michigan's admission to the Union in 1837, Detroit served as the state's first capital and hosted the inaugural state elections that same year.

Between 1815 and 1900, the city borders expanded significantly through the annexation of land from surrounding townships, such as Hamtramck, Springwells, Greenfield, and Grosse Pointe, before many of those townships incorporated as independent cities in the 20th century. Public land sales began in 1818, and by 1836, the city formalized its public water supply by establishing a municipal water works. It followed the end of the second cholera pandemic that had devastated Detroit and many other North American cities.

The city's population grew steadily throughout the 19th century, fueled by immigrants from Germany, Poland, Italy, Greece, and Belgium. By the 1830s, Germans had become the city's predominant ethnic group. During the Irish Great Famine of the 1840s, a wave of Irish immigrants arrived, settling primarily in the Corktown neighborhood. Detroit's Black population remained small during the 19th century; it constituted less than four percent of the city's population by the time of the 1863 race riot during the Civil War, numbering roughly 1,500 to 1,600 residents.

Detroit's unique geography provided easy access to raw materials like iron ore, copper, coal, and timber. Coupled with the opening of the Erie Canal in 1825, this proximity shifted the city's local economy toward heavy industries such as machinery, metalworking, and engine production in the mid-19th century. Well before the automotive era, the city led the nation in the construction of railroad cars and freighters; the Michigan-Peninsular Car Company was the city's largest manufacturer during that period, while the Detroit Dry Dock Company built hulls for the largest ships on the Great Lakes. By the 1870s, cast-iron stoves manufacturing had become Detroit's largest single industry. The city also became a major producer of pharmaceuticals, seeds, tobacco, and beer, with companies like the Ferry-Morse Seed Company and pharmaceutical companies Parke-Davis and Frederick Stearns & Co. emerging as national industry leaders. The Detroit International Exposition and Fair (1889–1892) showcased the city's expanding economy in the late 19th century.

=== Progressive Era (1890-1929) ===
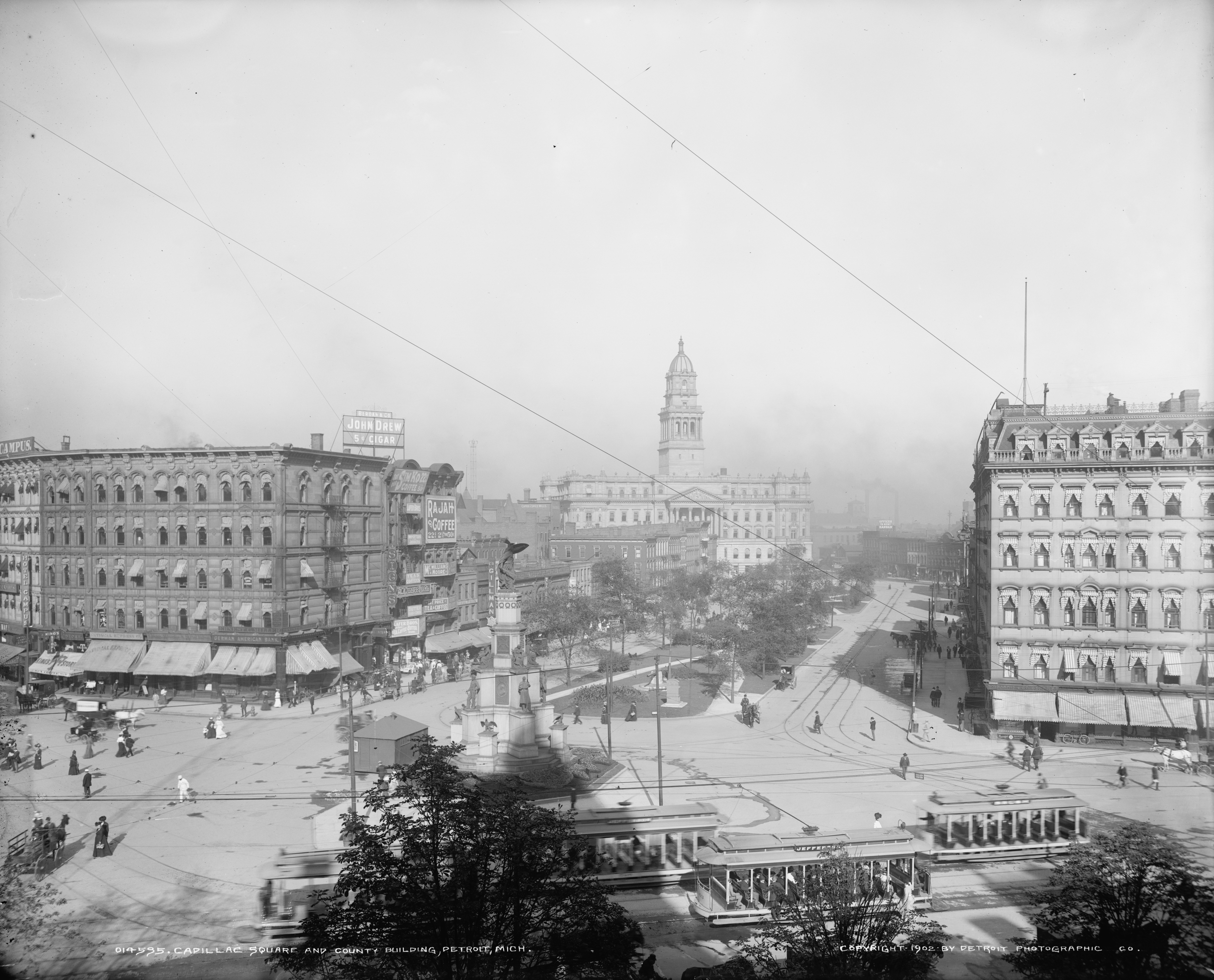
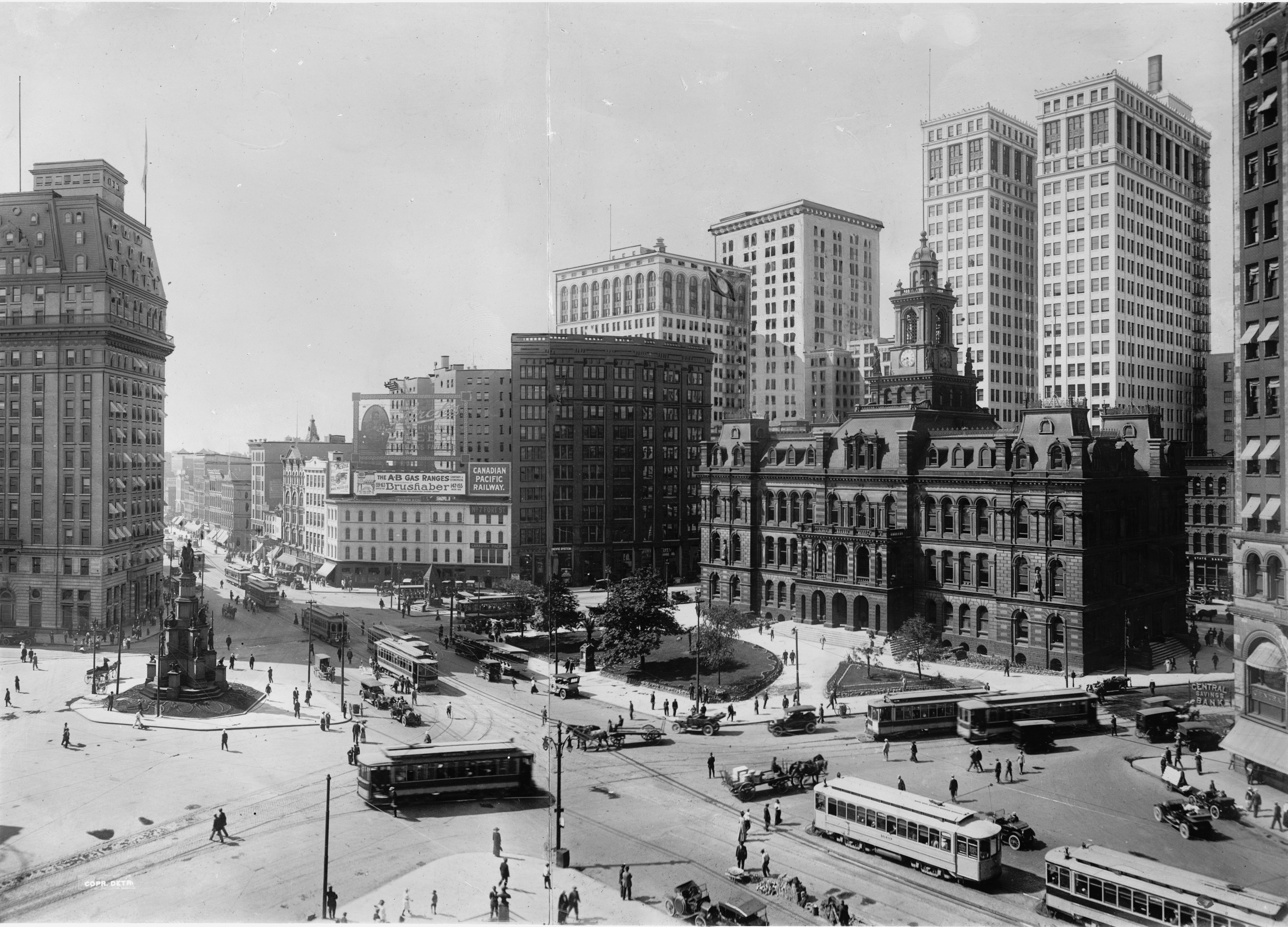
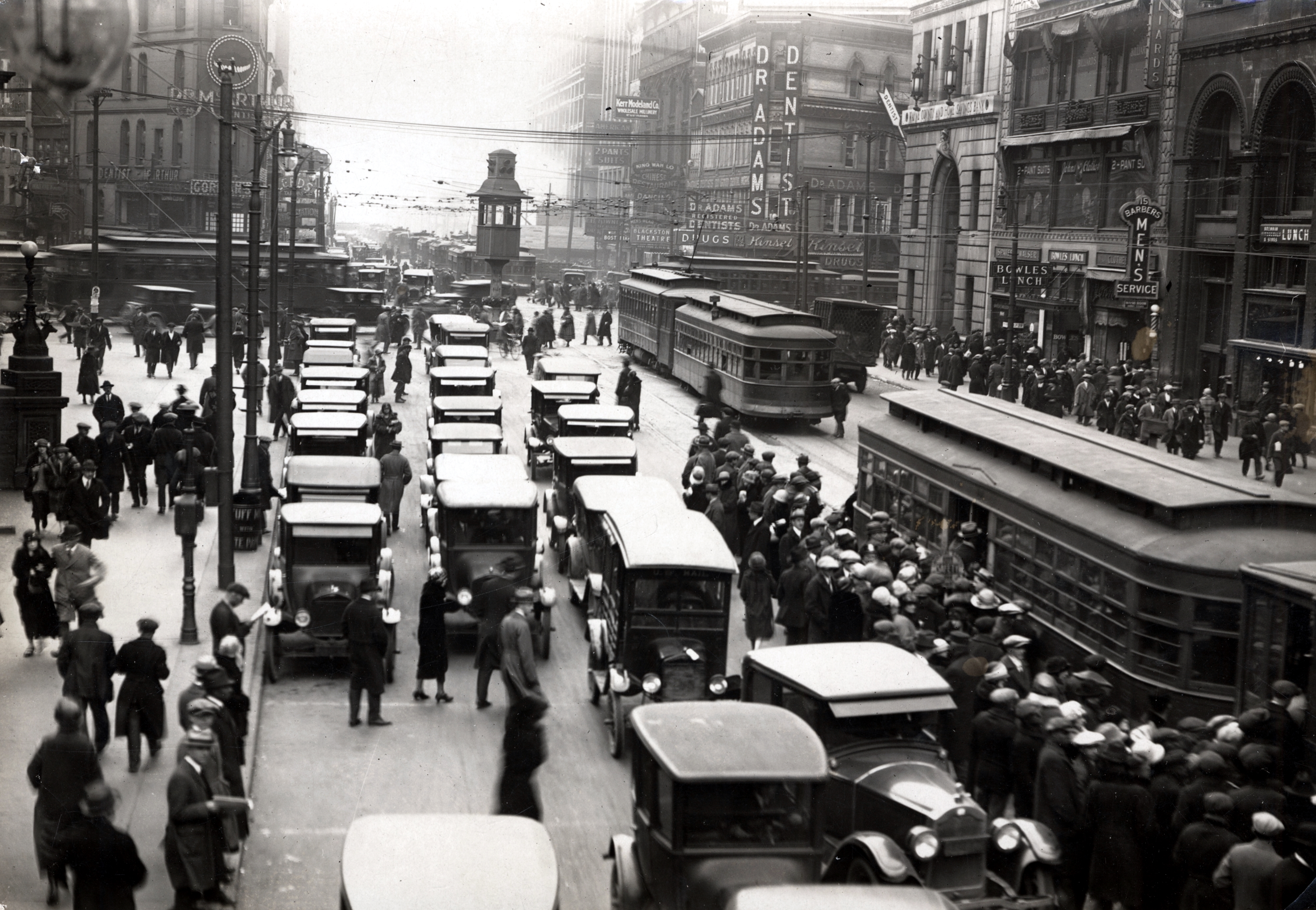
From top: Cadillac Square and Wayne County Building (1902); Cadillac Square (1910s); corner of Michigan Avenue and Griswold Street (circa 1920)

Detroit saw explosive growth in the auto industry in the early 20th century. In 1913, Henry Ford's moving assembly line revolutionized automotive manufacturing, reducing chassis assembly time by nearly 90%. This efficiency enabled low-cost mass production, with a new Model T rolling off the line every 24 seconds at peak capacity. By 1920, Detroit's automakers, including Ford, Buick (GM), Chevrolet (GM), Dodge Brothers (Chrysler), and Maxwell (Chrysler), were producing one million cars annually, accounting for roughly half of the world's total production. The city was undoubtedly the automotive capital of the world.

Before the rise of the auto industry, Detroit was already a primary gateway for iron ore, coal, and grain moving through the Great Lakes. Its shipping tonnage frequently exceeded that of the world's major saltwater ports; in 1907 alone, the Detroit River carried over 67 million tons of cargo, surpassing that of the ports of London (18.7 million) and New York City (20.4 million) combined. The subsequent surge in auto production after 1914 fueled a parallel expansion in the city's commerce. However, the increasing traffic at the Detroit-Windsor crossing frequently caused bottlenecks, as railroads and automobiles still relied on slow ferries. The opening of the Michigan Central Railway Tunnel, the Ambassador Bridge, and the Detroit–Windsor Tunnel largely replaced these ferries, significantly reducing the shipment and storage costs of essential commodities.

Between 1900 and 1930, the city's population more than quintupled, soaring from roughly 285,000 to 1.6 million. By 1950, Detroit's population peaked at 1.85 million, making it the fifth-largest city in the U.S. At the time, residents enjoyed the highest per capita income in the country, driven by high-paying manufacturing jobs in the booming automotive industry. In fact, a typical Ford worker earned an annual wage more than twice the national median. During this era, Detroit also maintained a lower poverty rate than its suburbs. With a median household income approximately 20% above the national number and one of the highest homeownership rates in the country, Detroit was the wealthiest city in the U.S. and, by some accounts, had the highest standard of living in the world.

=== Great Depression and World War II (1929-1945) ===
The Great Depression hit Detroit hard as car sales plummeted, leading to mass unemployment. Banks and companies listed on the Detroit Stock Exchange, then one of the largest regional stock exchanges in America and closely tied to the city's economy, recorded sharp declines in share prices and trading volume. During this period, the city saw the formation of several labor unions, notably the United Auto Workers, founded in Detroit in 1935. Meanwhile, the Teamsters strengthened their Detroit operations in the early 1930s, largely through James Hoffa's organizing of warehouse and freight drivers. As the city emerged from the Depression, racial tensions escalated between white residents and Black Southerners who had arrived during the Great Migration. This friction, fueled by intense competition for jobs and housing, eventually culminated in the 1943 race riot.

During World War II, the U.S. government encouraged the retooling of the auto industry to support the Allies. Civilian car production ceased from 1942 to 1945 as factories shifted to manufacturing military equipment. Despite having only 2% of the U.S. population, the city produced over 10% of all American war materiel, while the broader Detroit metro region accounted for nearly 30% of the nation's total output. This staggering output was led by the Detroit Assembly and the Detroit Tank Arsenal, which together produced nearly as many tanks as all of Nazi Germany.

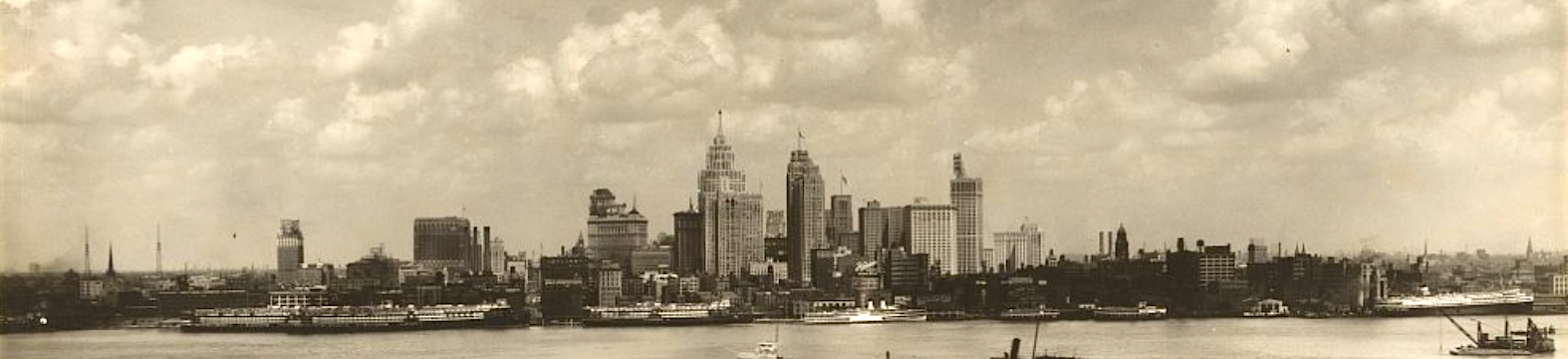
The skyline of Downtown Detroit in 1929

=== Late 20th century ===
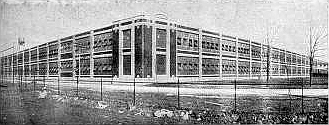
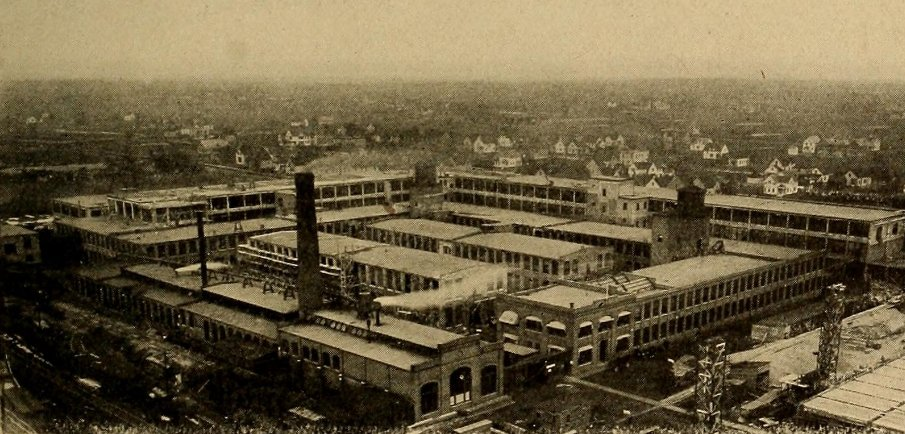
The Hudson Motor Plant (above) and the Packard Automotive Plant (below) were among many Detroit auto factories that closed during the industrial deconcentration in the 1950s.

The first signs of Detroit's decline appeared in the 1950s with the onset of industrial deconcentration and suburbanization. The Packard Automotive Plant closed during that decade, and the massive Hudson Motor Plant at East Jefferson and Conner was largely demolished by 1961. Studebaker ended its manufacturing presence in Detroit in 1956, and Kaiser-Frazer ceased local passenger car production in the mid-1950s.

In 1961, under the Louis Miriani administration, the city recorded its first post-war budget deficit of $16 million. This shortfall resulted from a sharp decline in tax revenue as major industries and residents moved to the suburbs. Since its 1950 peak of 1.85 million, Detroit has lost 65% of its population.

As the city's overall population declined, its Black population nearly doubled between 1950 and 1970, and the city officially became majority-Black in the 1970s. Most migrated from the Deep South, drawn by auto industry jobs. However, these newcomers were often relegated to lower-paying roles, while higher-paying positions remained dominated by longtime white residents. Furthermore, discriminatory redlining policies frequently denied them access to essential financial services. This era was defined by the civil rights movement; notably, in June 1963, Dr. Martin Luther King Jr. delivered a major speech during the Detroit Walk to Freedom that foreshadowed his "I Have a Dream" speech in Washington, D.C., just two months later. Despite the passage of federal civil rights legislation, deep-seated racial tensions ignited the 12th Street Riot in 1967, which remains one of the deadliest and costliest civil disturbances in U.S. history.

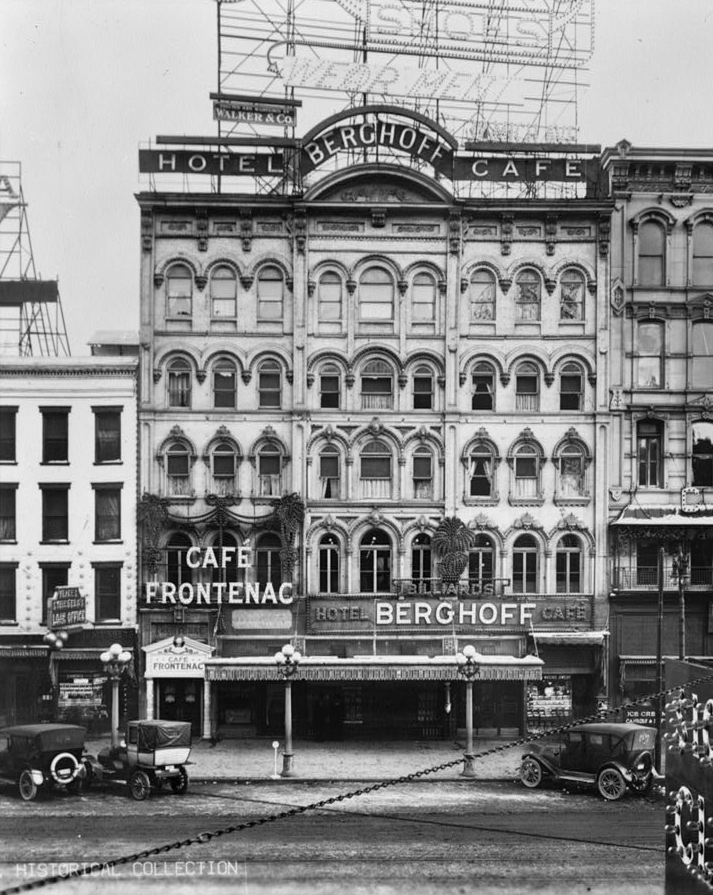
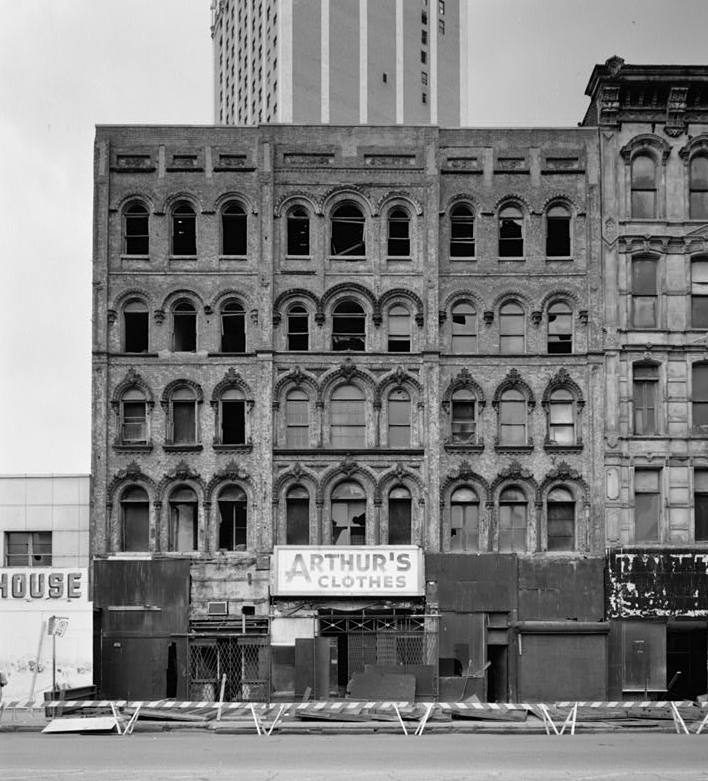
A photo comparison spanning 74 years, showing the decline of Downtown Detroit: the First Williams Block on Monroe Street in 1915 (left) vs. 1989 (right)

In 1973, Coleman Young was elected as Detroit's first Black mayor. Throughout his 20-year tenure, the city's economy continued to deteriorate as businesses and residents fled. Early in his first term, Young faced a looming "near-bankruptcy" situation. To maintain a balanced budget, he implemented aggressive tax increases and spending cuts. While these policies were intended to ensure the city's solvency, critics often argue they actually accelerated the exodus of businesses and residents, creating a "financial death spiral." As income tax rates rose to cover budget gaps, the resulting departure of taxpayers inadvertently led to further deficits.

During the recession of the early 1980s, triggered by the 1979 oil crisis, the automotive industry suffered massive layoffs, leaving Detroit with a $119 million deficit by 1981. To avoid bankruptcy, Young successfully campaigned for an income tax hike and sold up to $125 million in emergency bonds. By his final year in office in 1993–94, the city faced a $271 million deficit. To address this, Young mandated a 10% salary cut for city employees before leaving office.

Detroit has lacked high-capacity mass transit since 1956, when its primary streetcar system was dismantled. Following mounting pressure for rapid transit, a 1972 study recommended a system connecting Downtown, Midtown, and suburbs like Dearborn, Southfield, and the Detroit Metro Airport. In 1976, U.S. President Gerald Ford offered the Detroit region $600 million in federal funding to build a robust mass transit system that included a subway and suburban commuter rail. However, local disagreements over project details and regional control delayed implementation for years, leading the Reagan administration to withdraw the funding in the early 1980s. By 1987, only the 2.9-mile People Mover loop was completed, serving as a fragment of the originally envisioned broader network.

Dennis Archer became Detroit's 67th mayor in January 1994, succeeding Coleman Young. While the city tax base continued to shrink with a declining population, the Archer administration was able to revitalize its finances. Inheriting an $88 million deficit, Archer balanced the budget within his first year through rigorous fiscal reforms. He streamlined the payroll by eliminating hundreds of municipal positions through attrition and deployed "turnaround teams" of outside business experts to improve city services. Under the Archer administration, Detroit stabilized its credit rating and achieved a streak of consistent budget surpluses.

To diversify Detroit's tax base and retain revenue that was otherwise flowing to the nearby city of Windsor, a statewide initiative was proposed and passed in 1996 to allow casino gambling in Detroit, leading to the opening of three privately owned casinos in the downtown area.

=== 21st century ===
==== Bankruptcy ====
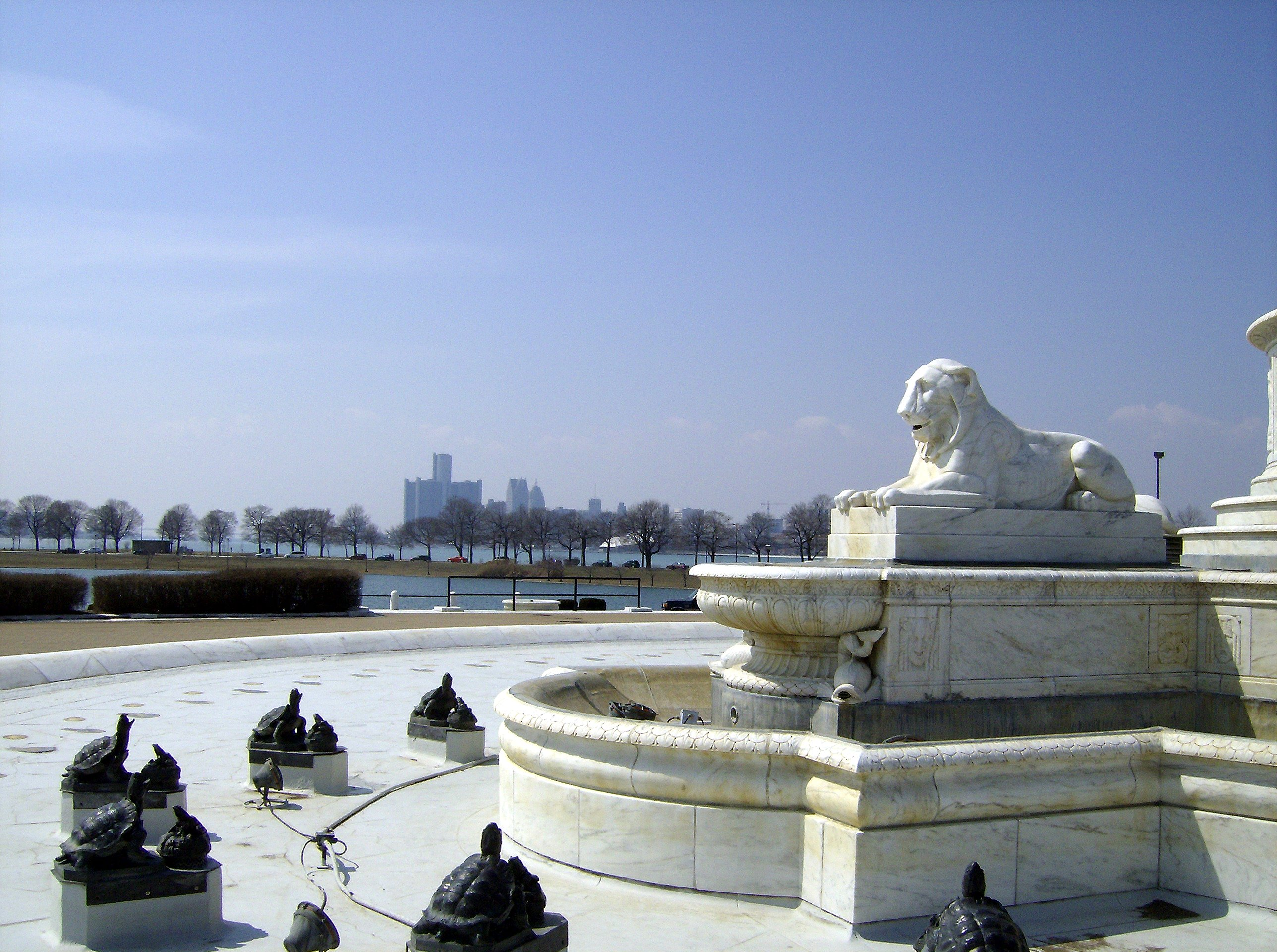
In 2012, Belle Isle suffered from an estimated $300 million in deferred maintenance due to the city's budget crisis. The park was leased to the state following the 2013 bankruptcy filing.

Starting in the mid-2000s, the city relied heavily on borrowing to address persistent budget gaps and pension liabilities, including $1.4 billion in 2005 alone. This initiated a seven-year streak of annual deficits, each exceeding $150 million. The then-Mayor, Kwame Kilpatrick, was forced to resign in 2008 after felony convictions, and was later sentenced to 28 years in federal prison. His actions were estimated to have cost the city approximately $20 million.

Between 2000 and 2010, the U.S. Census recorded Detroit's largest single-decade population drop in its history, at approximately 25%. This severe population decline resulted in a massive reduction in state revenue sharing, as constitutional revenue sharing is distributed on a per capita basis. Furthermore, foreclosures caused by unemployment reduced property values across the city following the Great Recession, further reducing the tax base. In 2011, the city government recorded that roughly half of its 305,000 property owners failed to pay their taxes, leaving over $246 million uncollected. By 2013, Detroit faced a $327 million budget deficit and more than $18 billion in total long-term debt and liabilities.

Facing a financial crisis, then-Mayor Dave Bing and the City Council accepted state oversight in exchange for financial aid from the state. In March 2013, Michigan Governor Rick Snyder declared a financial emergency in Detroit, leading the Local Emergency Financial Assistance Loan Board to appoint Kevyn Orr as the city’s emergency manager. After negotiations for cuts failed, Orr announced on June 14 that Detroit would default on approximately $2.5 billion in unsecured debt and skipped a $39.7 million interest payment. On July 18, 2013, Detroit became the largest U.S. city by population to file for Chapter 9 bankruptcy.

==== Post-bankruptcy (2014-present) ====
In 2014, Mike Duggan, the former CEO of the Detroit Medical Center, was elected mayor as the city exited bankruptcy in December, having cut $7 billion in debt and invested $1.7 billion in services. To reduce operating costs between 2012 and 2015, Detroit cut its full-time workforce by nearly 40%. It also eliminated annual maintenance and operation expenses for Belle Isle by leasing the park to the state. The lease is set for 30 years, with the option for two 15-year renewals. Additionally, the Detroit Institute of Arts became a private organization to help fund the city's recovery following legal battles.

Following its bankruptcy exit, Detroit has stabilized its finances with a string of budget surpluses under the Duggan administration. The city now maintains roughly $550 million in reserves. These funds are earmarked for the city’s rainy day fund, retiree protection, and various liability funds to mitigate potential economic slumps. The city resumed payments to its two pension funds in 2024, ending a nine-year period during which the state of Michigan and private organizations handled those contributions.

Since 2014, the city's neighborhoods have witnessed the demolition of over 27,000 dangerous, long-abandoned residential structures that had become hotbeds for criminal activity. Initiatives such as "ShotStoppers," which mobilizes local community groups to reduce violence in their neighborhoods, along with other violence intervention programs and youth homelessness initiatives, have provided mental health support, job placement, and housing assistance to at-risk youth, contributing to a decline in the city's crime rate. Additionally, efforts have been made to enhance city services, including improvements to emergency response times, bus services, and the replacement of tens of thousands of non-functional streetlights with LED light.

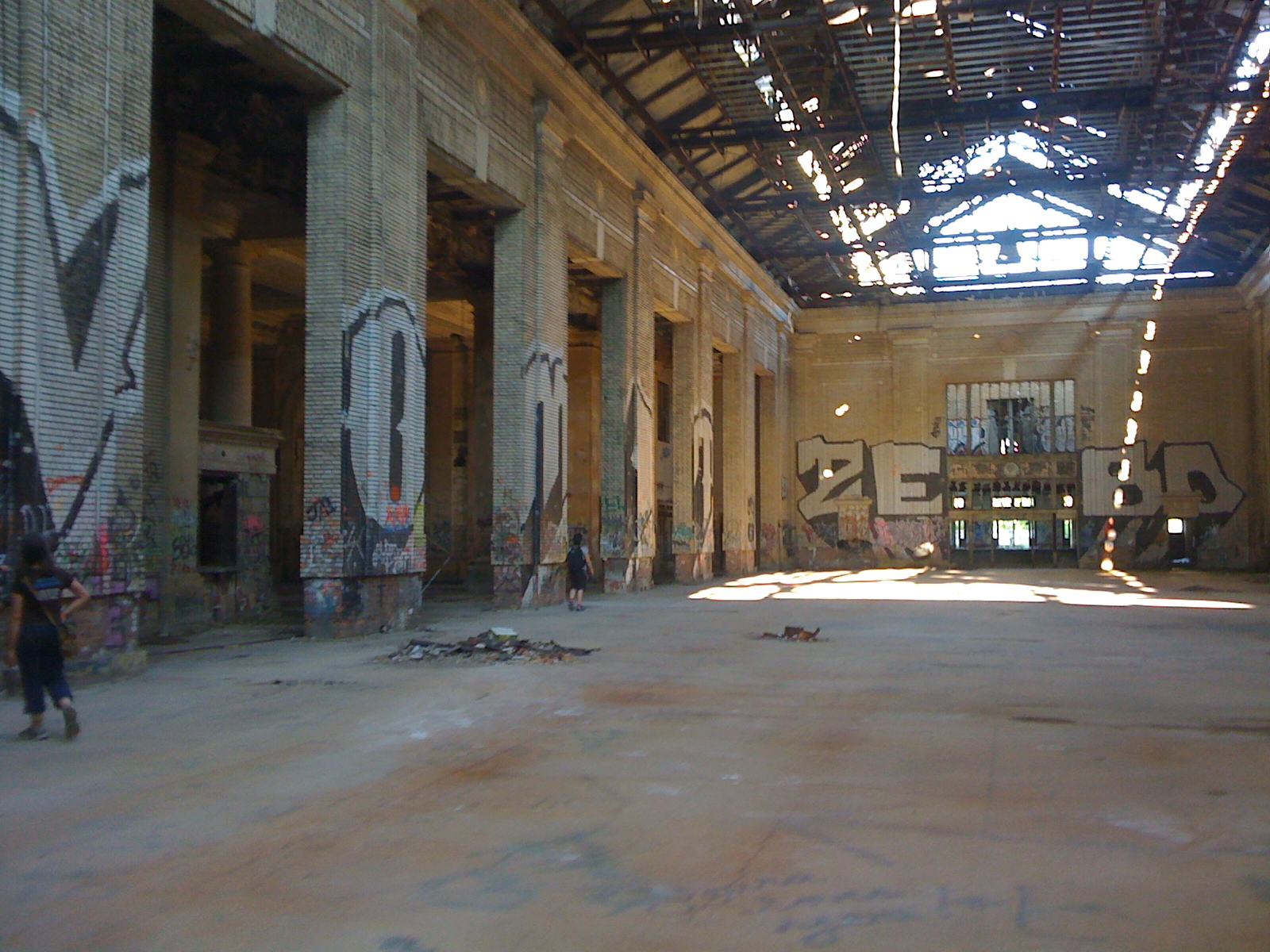
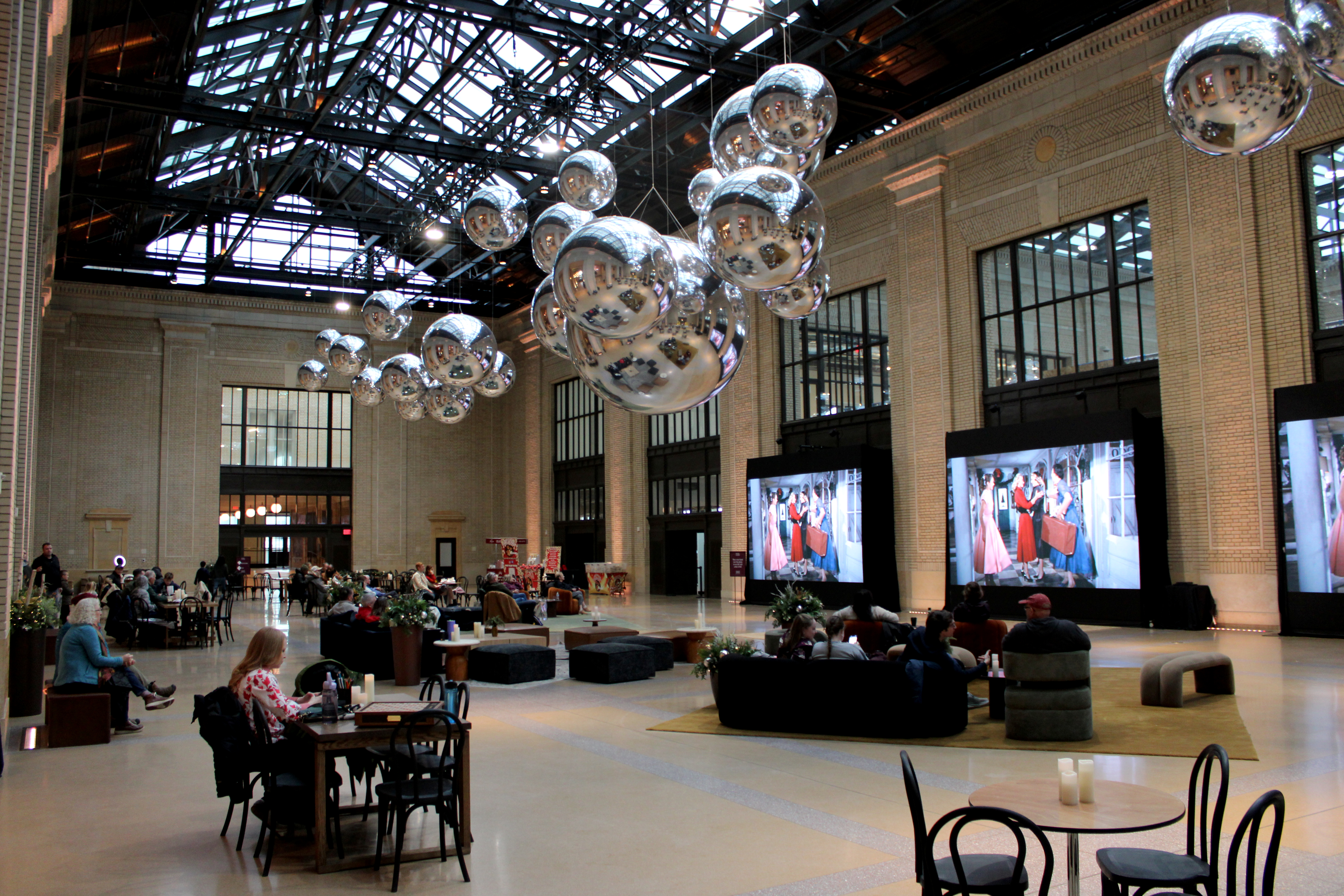
Michigan Central Station in 2010 (left) before its renovation, and in 2025 (right) after Ford Motor Company undertook extensive renovations to transform the historic site into the company's Corktown campus.

Downtown Detroit, which had long been neglected, has seen numerous new developments through public-private partnerships. Since 2014, many abandoned or underutilized landmark buildings in the downtown area have been revitalized through the city's subsidized programs and private investments. The city's streetcar system, QLine, opened for public use in May 2017. The construction of Little Caesars Arena and Hudson's Detroit has attracted many small businesses, including shops and restaurants along Woodward Avenue. The long-vacant Michigan Central Station was purchased by the Ford Motor Company in 2018 and is being redeveloped into the company's new campus, driving the revitalization of the surrounding Corktown area.

After more than half a century of population decline, the city experienced its first population growth since the late 1950s in 2024, recording a higher growth rate than any other city in the state. In 2025, the United States Census Bureau reported that Detroit's population had increased for the second consecutive year.

In January 2026, Mary Sheffield, the former president of the Detroit City Council, was sworn in as the city's 76th mayor. She is the first woman to be elected to the office.

While Detroit has seen gains in city finances and investor confidence, it still lags significantly behind national standards for income and education. It remains the poorest large city in the United States, with half of its children living in poverty. In 2024, the city's median household income was less than half the national number. Education remains a critical challenge; despite having high per-pupil funding, the Detroit Public Schools ranked last among 26 large urban districts. Proficiency in reading and math stands at less than 10% for both fourth and eighth graders, and 61% of students were chronically absent during the 2024–25 school year.

== Geography ==
=== Topography ===
A satellite image from Sentinel-2 of Detroit and its surrounding metropolitan area with Windsor, Ontario across the river, September 2021

According to the U.S. Census Bureau, the city has a total area of 142.87 square miles (370.03 km^{2}), of which 138.75 square miles (359.36 km^{2}) is land and 4.12 square miles (10.67 km^{2}) is water. Detroit is the principal city in Metro Detroit and Southeast Michigan. It is situated in the Midwestern United States and the Great Lakes region.

The Detroit River International Wildlife Refuge is the only international wildlife preserve in North America and is uniquely located in the heart of a major metropolitan area. The refuge includes islands, coastal wetlands, marshes, shoals, and waterfront lands along 48 miles (77 km) of the Detroit River and western Lake Erie shoreline.

The city slopes gently from the northwest to southeast on a till plain composed largely of glacial and lake clay. The most notable topographical feature in the city is the Detroit Moraine, a broad clay ridge on which the older portions of Detroit and Windsor are located, rising approximately 62 feet (19 m) above the river at its highest point. The highest elevation in the city is directly north of Gorham Playground on the northwest side approximately three blocks south of 8 Mile Road, at a height of 675 to 680 feet (206 to 207 m). Detroit's lowest elevation is along the Detroit River, at a surface height of 572 feet (174 m).

=== Cityscape ===
Detroit skyline as viewed from Belle Isle in September 2025

==== Architecture ====
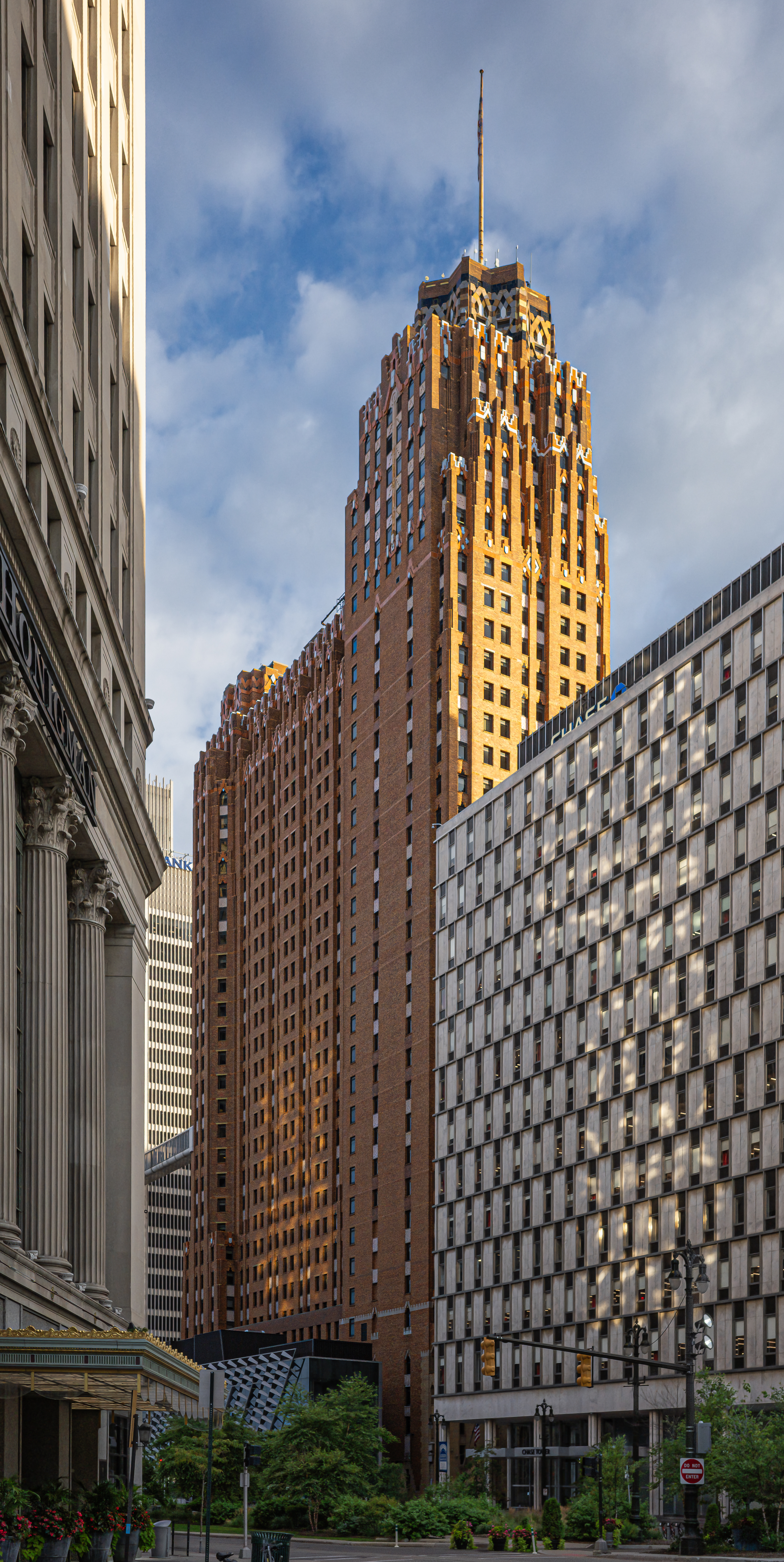
The Guardian Building was designated a National Historic Landmark in 1989.

Detroit's waterfront showcases a variety of architectural styles, with the postmodern Neo-Gothic spires of Ally Detroit Center paying homage to the city's Art Deco skyscrapers. Together with the Renaissance Center, these buildings form a distinctive and recognizable skyline. Examples of the Art Deco style include the Guardian Building and Penobscot Building downtown, as well as the Fisher Building and Cadillac Place in New Center. Prominent cultural landmarks from the early 20th century include the Fox Theatre, Detroit Opera House, and Detroit Institute of Arts.

While Downtown Detroit and New Center feature high-rise buildings, much of Detroit consists of low-rise structures and single-family homes. Residential high-rises are concentrated in upscale neighborhoods such as the East Riverfront, extending toward Grosse Pointe, and Palmer Park. The University Commons-Palmer Park district anchors historic areas including Palmer Woods, Sherwood Forest, and the University District near the University of Detroit Mercy.

42 significant structures in the city are listed on the National Register of Historic Places. Pre-World War II neighborhoods exhibit architectural styles of the era, with working-class areas featuring wood-frame and brick houses, while middle- and upper-class neighborhoods such as Brush Park, Woodbridge, Indian Village, Palmer Woods, and Boston-Edison contain larger, more ornate homes and mansions. Multi-million dollar restorations and new developments have revitalized neighborhoods such as West Canfield and Brush Park.

The city has one of the United States' largest surviving collections of late 19th- and early 20th-century buildings. Architecturally significant churches and cathedrals in the city include St. Joseph's, Old St. Mary's, the Sweetest Heart of Mary, and the Cathedral of the Most Blessed Sacrament. Historic preservation efforts continue to thrive, with downtown redevelopment projects revitalizing parts of the city, among them Campus Martius Park, Grand Circus Park near the city's theater district, Ford Field, Comerica Park, and Little Caesars Arena.

==== Neighborhoods ====
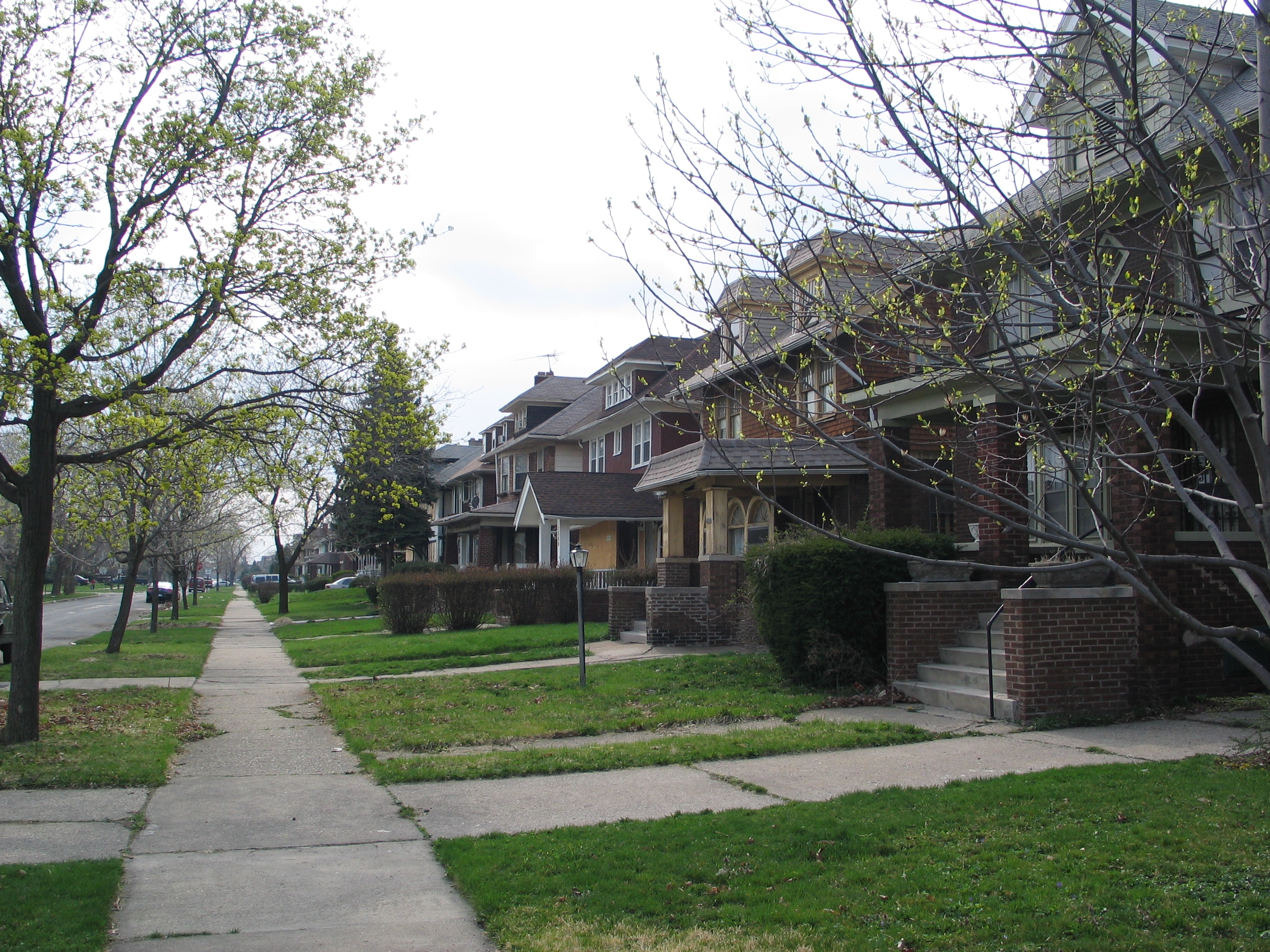
Typical Detroit Arts and Crafts-style brick houses in the Atkinson Avenue Historic District

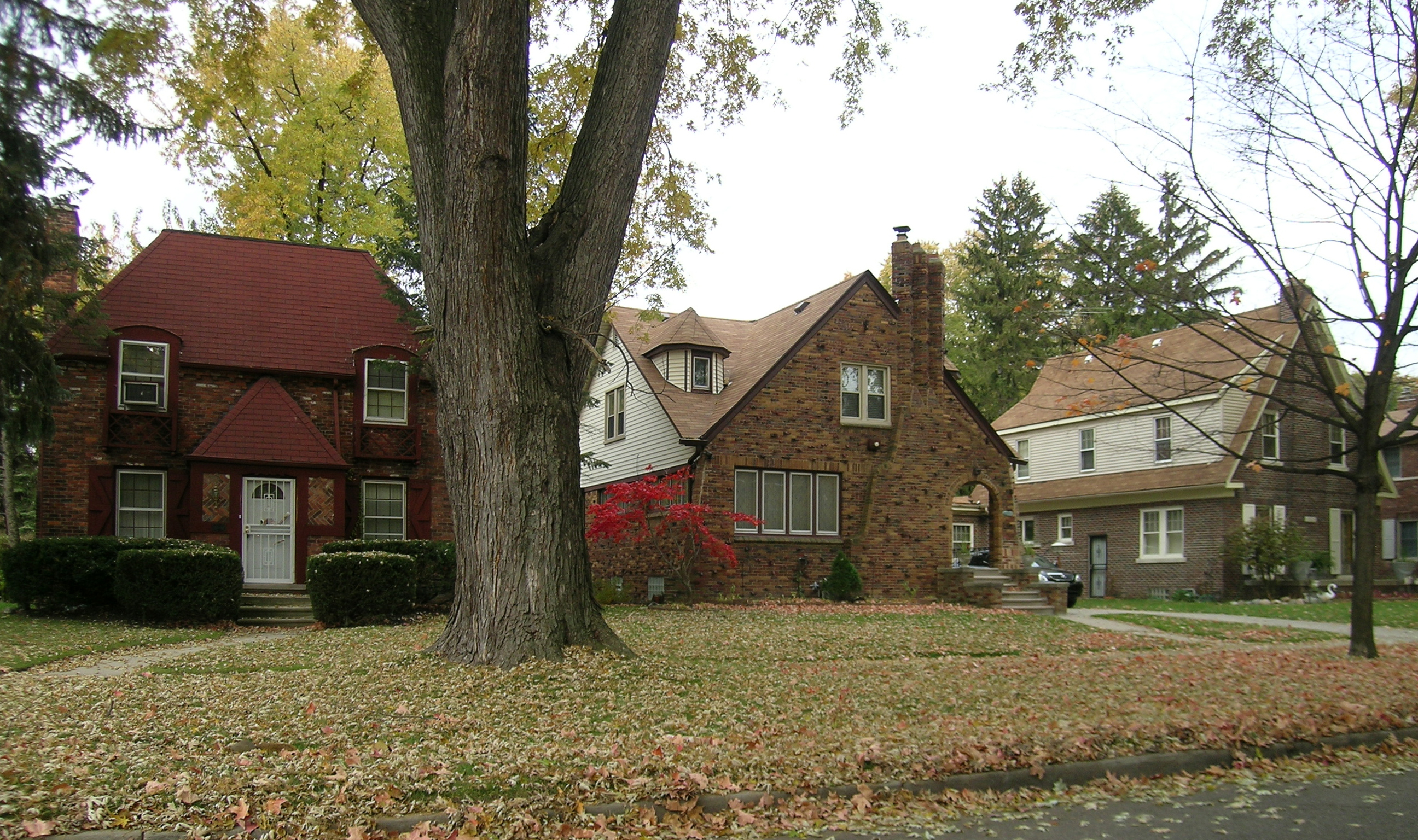
Single-family homes in the Rosedale Park Historic District

Detroit has a variety of neighborhood types. The revitalized Downtown, Midtown, Corktown, New Center areas feature many historic buildings and are high density, while further out, particularly in the northeast and on the fringes, high vacancy levels are problematic, for which a number of solutions have been proposed. In 2007, Downtown Detroit was recognized as the best city neighborhood in which to retire among the United States' largest metro areas by CNNMoney editors.

Lafayette Park is a revitalized neighborhood on the city's east side, part of the Ludwig Mies van der Rohe residential district. The 78-acre (32 ha) development was originally called the Gratiot Park. Planned by Mies van der Rohe, Ludwig Hilberseimer and Alfred Caldwell it includes a landscaped, 19-acre (7.7 ha) park with no through traffic, in which these and other low-rise apartment buildings are situated. Immigrants have contributed to the city's neighborhood revitalization, especially in southwest Detroit. Southwest Detroit has experienced a thriving economy in recent years, as evidenced by new housing, increased business openings and the recently opened Mexicantown International Welcome Center.

The city has numerous neighborhoods consisting of vacant properties resulting in low inhabited density in those areas, stretching city services and infrastructure. These neighborhoods are concentrated in the northeast and on the city's fringes. A 2009 parcel survey found about a quarter of residential lots in the city to be undeveloped or vacant, and about 10% of the city's housing to be unoccupied. The survey also reported that most (86%) of the city's homes are in good condition with a minority (9%) in fair condition needing only minor repairs.

To deal with vacancy issues, the city has begun demolishing the derelict houses, razing 3,000 of the total 10,000 in 2010, but the resulting low density creates a strain on the city's infrastructure. To remedy this, a number of solutions have been proposed including resident relocation from more sparsely populated neighborhoods and converting unused space to urban agricultural use, including Hantz Woodlands, though the city expects to be in the planning stages for up to another two years.

Public funding and private investment have been made with promises to rehabilitate neighborhoods. In April 2008, the city announced a $300 million (~$440 million in 2025) stimulus plan to create jobs and revitalize neighborhoods, financed by city bonds and paid for by earmarking about 15% of the wagering tax. The city's working plans for neighborhood revitalizations include 7-Mile/Livernois, Brightmoor, East English Village, Grand River/Greenfield, North End, and Osborn. Private organizations have pledged substantial funding to the efforts. Additionally, the city has cleared a 1,200-acre (490 ha) section of land for large-scale neighborhood construction, which the city is calling the Far Eastside Plan. In 2011, Mayor Dave Bing announced a plan to categorize neighborhoods by their needs and prioritize the most needed services for those neighborhoods.

Residential properties in Detroit

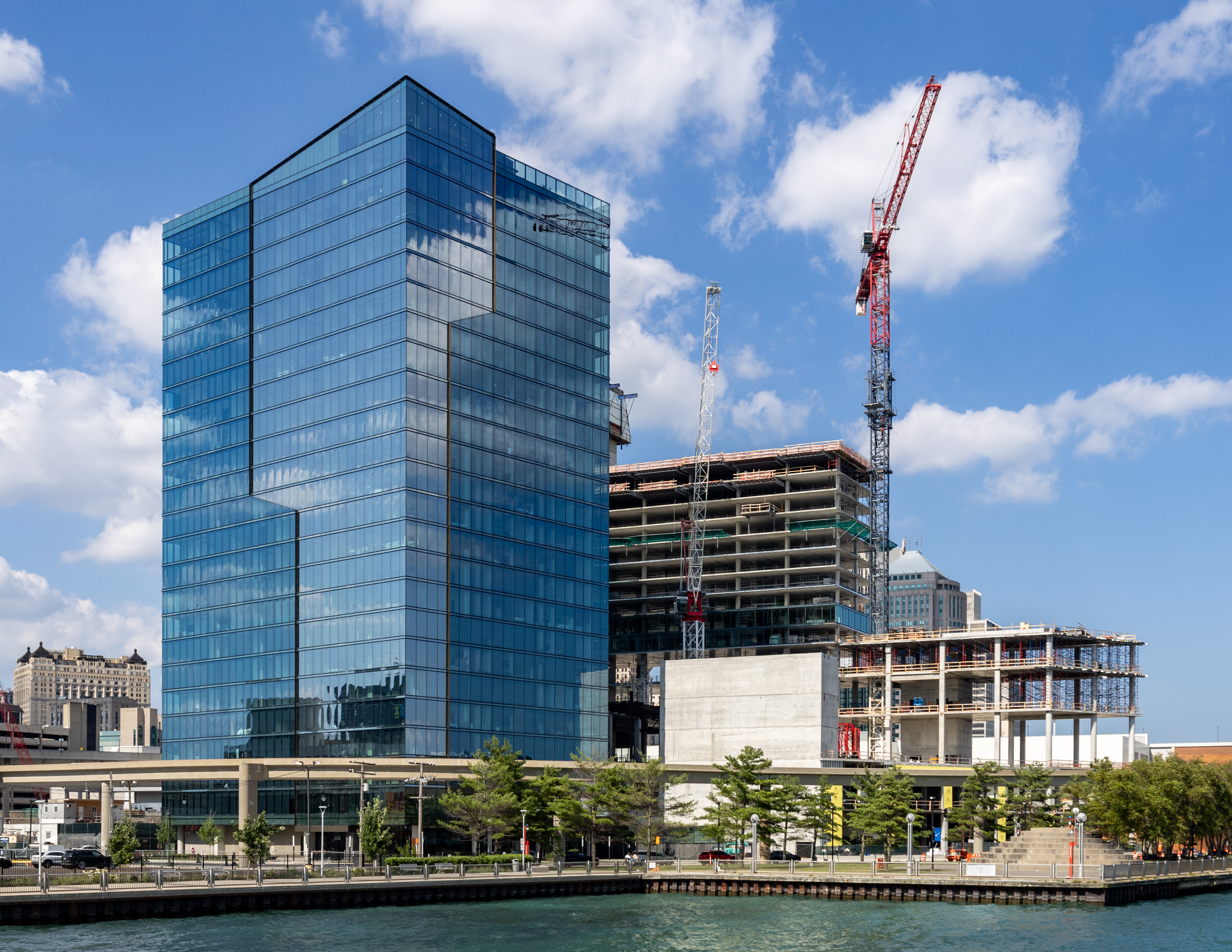
Riverfront high-rise apartment near the Detroit Financial District

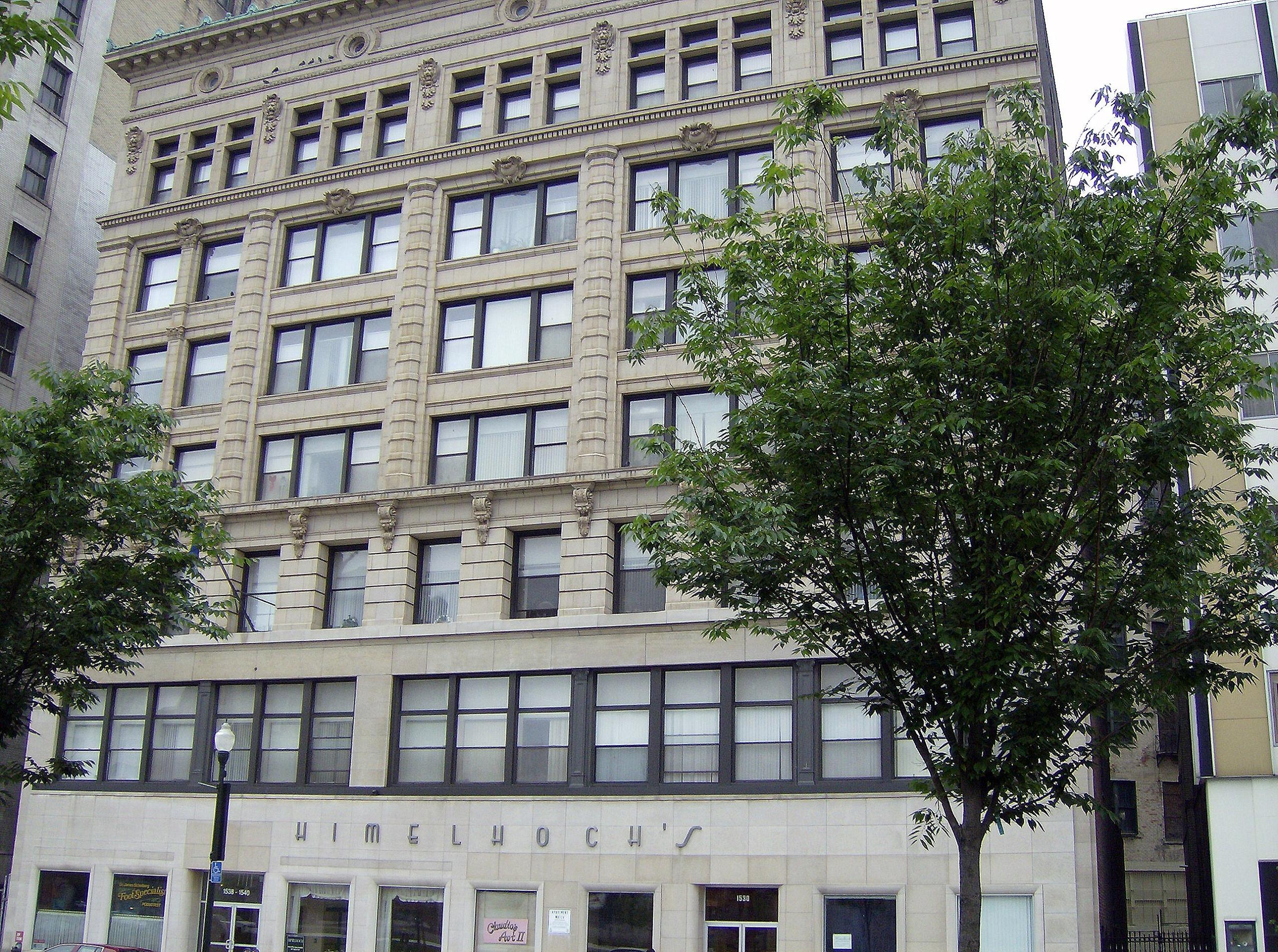
A low-rise apartment building in Downtown Detroit

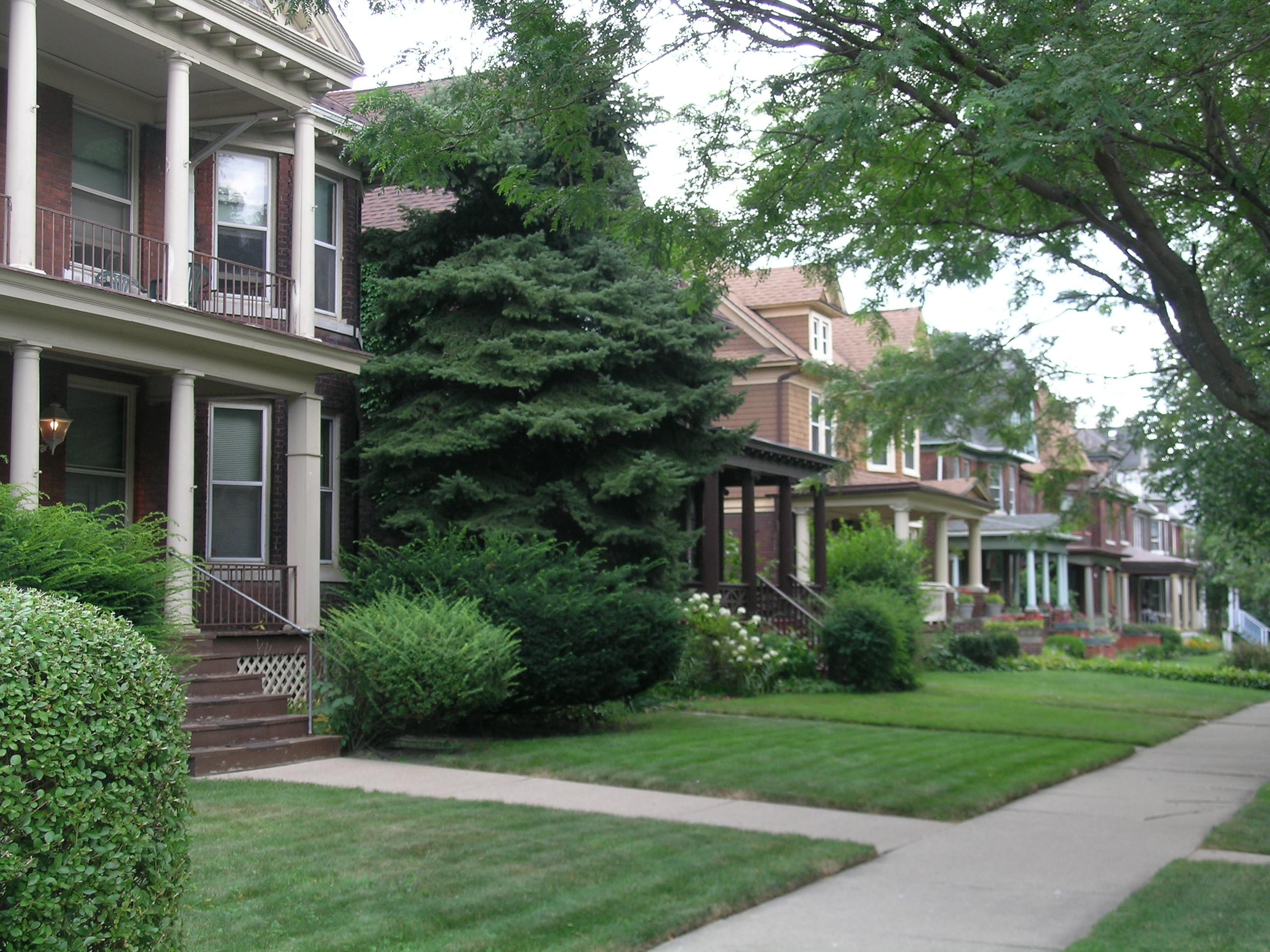
Single-family homes in the Woodbridge Historic District

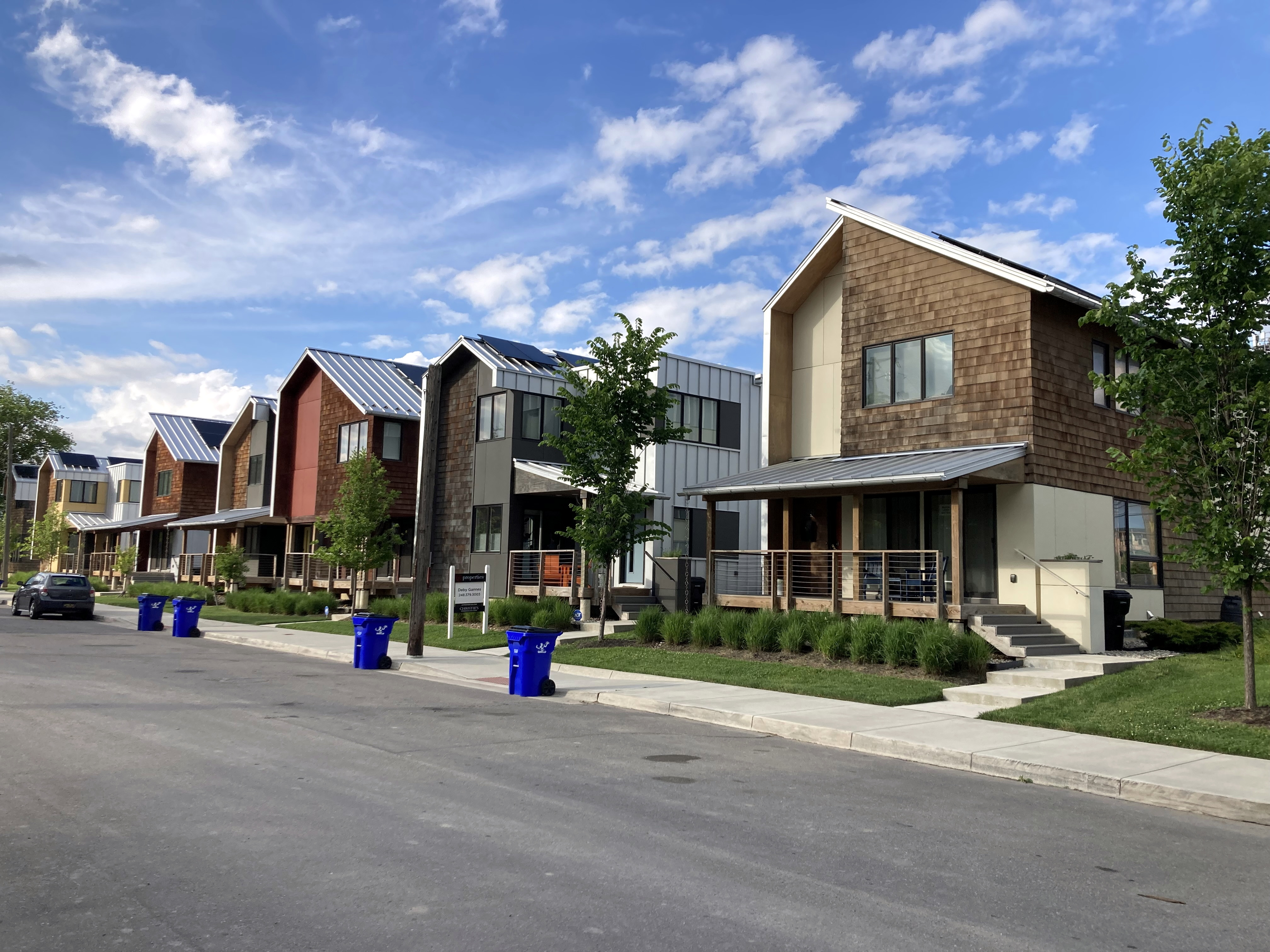
Newly constructed single-family homes in Midtown Detroit

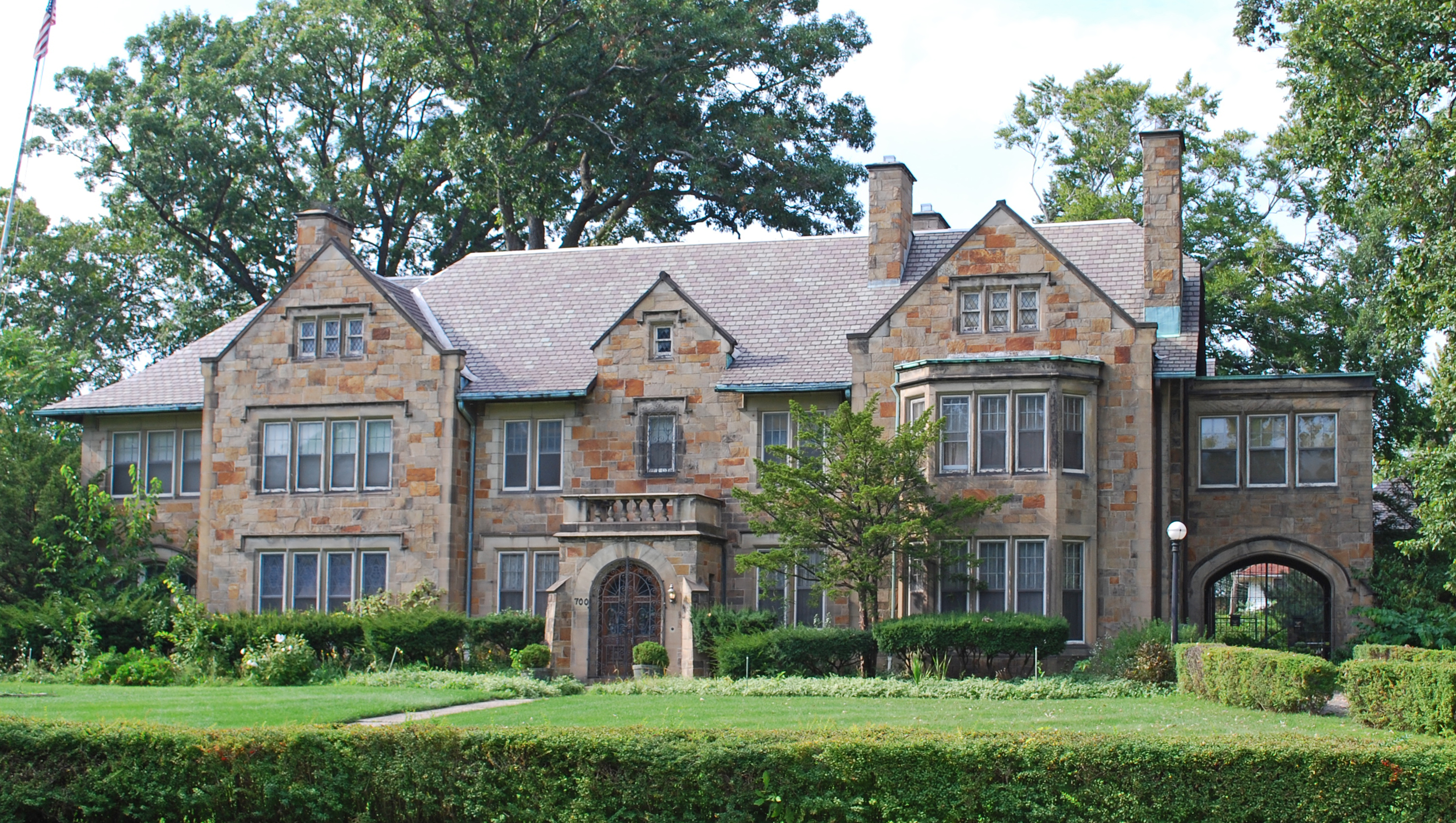
A historic mansion in the Boston-Edison Historic District

=== Monuments and parks ===
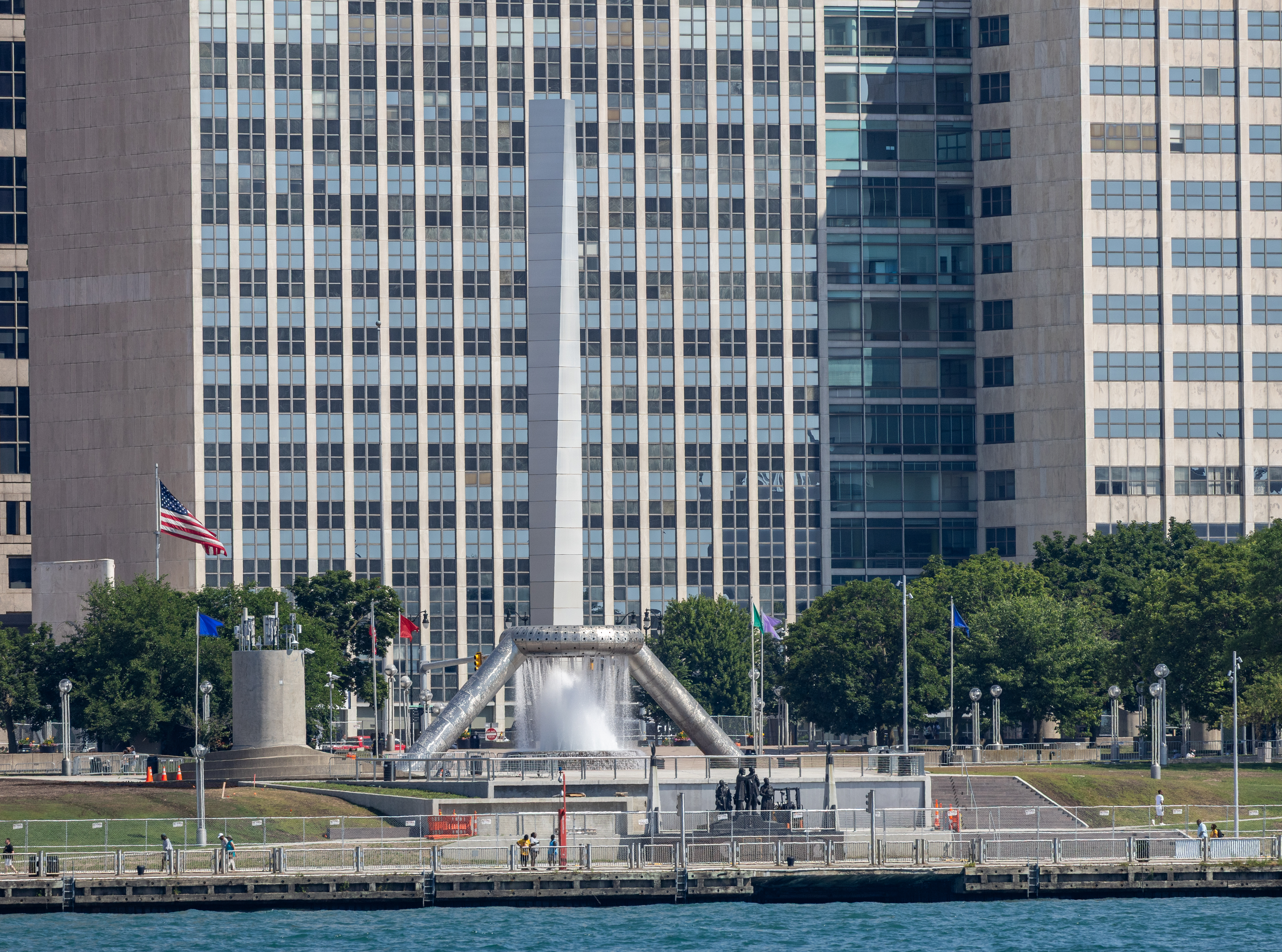
The Horace E. Dodge and Son Memorial Fountain in Hart Plaza

Detroit Parks & Recreation maintains 308 public parks, covering 4,950 acres (2,003 ha), or about 5.6% of the city's land area. Grand Circus Park, established in 1847 as part of the original Woodward plan, was the city's first official municipal park. Other major parks include Campus Martius, Belle Isle, River Rouge, Palmer, and Chene Park. The Detroit International Riverfront also serves as a key recreation space, featuring a 3.5-mile promenade from Hart Plaza to Belle Isle, with a second phase planned to extend the promenade to the Ambassador Bridge.

In the surrounding Metro Area, the Huron–Clinton Metroparks system (established in 1940) includes 13 regional parks. These span over 24,000 acres (97 km^{2}) along the Huron and Clinton Rivers.

Detroit is also renowned for its outdoor public art. Many of its fountains serve as monumental landmarks, including the Bagley Memorial Fountain, the Horace E. Dodge and Son Memorial Fountain in Hart Plaza, and the James Scott Memorial Fountain on Belle Isle.

An important civic sculpture is The Spirit of Detroit by Marshall Fredericks at the Coleman Young Municipal Center. The image is often used as a symbol of Detroit, and the statue is occasionally dressed in sports jerseys to celebrate when a Detroit team is doing well. A memorial to Joe Louis is located at the intersection of Jefferson and Woodward Avenues. The sculpture, commissioned by Sports Illustrated and executed by Robert Graham, is a 24-foot (7.3 m) long arm with a fist suspended by a pyramidal framework.

=== Climate ===
Romulus, Michigan (DTW)

Climate chart (precipitation, max. and min. temperature)
J	F	M	A	M	J	J	A	S	O	N	D
2.2 33 19	2.1 35 21	2.4 46 29	3.3 59 39	3.7 71 50	3.3 80 60	3.5 84 64	3.3 82 63	3.2 75 56	2.5 62 44	2.6 49 34	2.3 37 25
- █ Average max. and min. temperatures in °F
- █ Precipitation totals in inches
Metric conversion
J	F	M	A	M	J	J	A	S	O	N	D
57 0 −7	53 2 −6	62 8 −2	83 15 4	94 21 10	83 27 16	89 29 18	83 28 17	82 24 13	64 17 7	65 9 1	57 3 −4
- █ Average max. and min. temperatures in °C
- █ Precipitation totals in mm

Detroit and the rest of southeastern Michigan have a hot-summer humid continental climate (Köppen: Dfa) which is influenced by the Great Lakes like other places in the state; the city and close-in suburbs are part of USDA Hardiness zone 6b, while the more distant northern and western suburbs generally are included in zone 6a. Winters are cold, with moderate snowfall and temperatures not rising above freezing on an average 44 days annually, while dropping to or below 0 °F (−18 °C) on an average 4.4 days a year; summers are warm to hot with temperatures exceeding 90 °F (32 °C) on 12 days. The warm season runs from May to September. The monthly daily mean temperature ranges from 25.6 °F (−3.6 °C) in January to 73.6 °F (23.1 °C) in July. Official temperature extremes range from 105 °F (41 °C) on July 24, 1934, down to −21 °F (−29 °C) on January 21, 1984; the record low maximum is −4 °F (−20 °C) on January 19, 1994, while, conversely the record high minimum is 80 °F (27 °C) on August 1, 2006, the most recent of five occurrences. A decade or two may pass between readings of 100 °F (38 °C) or higher, which last occurred July 17, 2012. The average window for freezing temperatures is October 20 through April 22, allowing a growing season of 180 days.

Precipitation is moderate and somewhat evenly distributed throughout the year, although the warmer months such as May and June average more, averaging 33.5 inches (850 mm) annually, but historically ranging from 20.49 in (520 mm) in 1963 to 47.70 in (1,212 mm) in 2011. Snowfall, which typically falls in measurable amounts between November 15 through April 4 (occasionally in October and very rarely in May), averages 42.5 inches (108 cm) per season, although historically ranging from 11.5 in (29 cm) in 1881–82 to 94.9 in (241 cm) in 2013–14. A thick layer of snow is not often seen, with an average of only 27.5 days with 3 in (7.6 cm) or more of snow cover. Thunderstorms are frequent in the Detroit area. These usually occur during spring and summer.

Climate data for Detroit (DTW), 1991–2020 normals, (Note: Mean monthly maxima and minima (i.e. the highest and lowest temperature readings during an entire month or year) calculated based on data at said location from 1991 to 2020.) extremes 1874–present (Note: Official records for Detroit were kept at downtown from January 1874 to December 1933, Detroit City Airport from February 1934 to March 1966, and at DTW since April 1966. For more information, see ThreadEx.)
Month	Jan	Feb	Mar	Apr	May	Jun	Jul	Aug	Sep	Oct	Nov	Dec	Year
Record high °F (°C)	67 (19)	73 (23)	86 (30)	89 (32)	95 (35)	104 (40)	105 (41)	104 (40)	100 (38)	92 (33)	81 (27)	69 (21)	105 (41)
Mean maximum °F (°C)	53.0 (11.7)	55.3 (12.9)	69.3 (20.7)	79.6 (26.4)	87.2 (30.7)	92.6 (33.7)	93.8 (34.3)	92.1 (33.4)	89.3 (31.8)	80.6 (27.0)	66.7 (19.3)	56.1 (13.4)	95.4 (35.2)
Mean daily maximum °F (°C)	32.3 (0.2)	35.2 (1.8)	45.9 (7.7)	58.7 (14.8)	70.3 (21.3)	79.7 (26.5)	83.7 (28.7)	81.4 (27.4)	74.4 (23.6)	62.0 (16.7)	48.6 (9.2)	37.2 (2.9)	59.1 (15.1)
Daily mean °F (°C)	25.8 (−3.4)	28.0 (−2.2)	37.2 (2.9)	48.9 (9.4)	60.3 (15.7)	69.9 (21.1)	74.1 (23.4)	72.3 (22.4)	64.9 (18.3)	53.0 (11.7)	41.2 (5.1)	31.3 (−0.4)	50.6 (10.3)
Mean daily minimum °F (°C)	19.2 (−7.1)	20.8 (−6.2)	28.6 (−1.9)	39.1 (3.9)	50.2 (10.1)	60.2 (15.7)	64.4 (18.0)	63.2 (17.3)	55.5 (13.1)	44.0 (6.7)	33.9 (1.1)	25.3 (−3.7)	42.0 (5.6)
Mean minimum °F (°C)	0.1 (−17.7)	3.5 (−15.8)	12.0 (−11.1)	25.5 (−3.6)	36.3 (2.4)	47.3 (8.5)	54.1 (12.3)	53.4 (11.9)	41.6 (5.3)	31.0 (−0.6)	19.8 (−6.8)	8.8 (−12.9)	−3.7 (−19.8)
Record low °F (°C)	−21 (−29)	−20 (−29)	−4 (−20)	8 (−13)	25 (−4)	36 (2)	42 (6)	38 (3)	29 (−2)	17 (−8)	0 (−18)	−11 (−24)	−21 (−29)
Average precipitation inches (mm)	2.23 (57)	2.08 (53)	2.43 (62)	3.26 (83)	3.72 (94)	3.26 (83)	3.51 (89)	3.26 (83)	3.22 (82)	2.53 (64)	2.57 (65)	2.25 (57)	34.32 (872)
Average snowfall inches (cm)	14.0 (36)	12.5 (32)	6.2 (16)	1.5 (3.8)	0.0 (0.0)	0.0 (0.0)	0.0 (0.0)	0.0 (0.0)	0.0 (0.0)	0.0 (0.0)	1.9 (4.8)	8.9 (23)	45.0 (114)
Average extreme snow depth inches (cm)	7.1 (18)	6.6 (17)	4.4 (11)	0.8 (2.0)	0.0 (0.0)	0.0 (0.0)	0.0 (0.0)	0.0 (0.0)	0.0 (0.0)	0.0 (0.0)	1.1 (2.8)	4.3 (11)	10.0 (25)
Average precipitation days (≥ 0.01 in)	13.4	11.0	11.1	12.5	12.9	10.7	10.5	9.7	9.5	10.6	11.0	13.1	136.0
Average snowy days (≥ 0.1 in)	10.7	9.2	5.3	1.5	0.1	0.0	0.0	0.0	0.0	0.2	2.6	8.0	37.6
Average relative humidity (%)	74.7	72.5	70.0	66.0	65.3	67.3	68.5	71.5	73.4	71.6	74.6	76.7	71.0
Average dew point °F (°C)	16.2 (−8.8)	17.6 (−8.0)	25.9 (−3.4)	35.1 (1.7)	45.7 (7.6)	55.6 (13.1)	60.4 (15.8)	59.7 (15.4)	53.2 (11.8)	41.4 (5.2)	32.4 (0.2)	21.9 (−5.6)	38.7 (3.7)
Mean monthly sunshine hours	119.9	138.3	184.9	217.0	275.9	301.8	317.0	283.5	227.6	176.0	106.3	87.7	2,435.9
Percentage possible sunshine	41	47	50	54	61	66	69	66	61	51	36	31	55
Average ultraviolet index	1.2	2.0	3.6	5.4	6.9	8.0	8.2	7.1	5.3	3.1	1.6	1.1	4.4
Source 1: NOAA (relative humidity, dew point, and sun 1961–1990)
Source 2: UV Index Today (1995 to 2022)

Climate data for Detroit
Month	Jan	Feb	Mar	Apr	May	Jun	Jul	Aug	Sep	Oct	Nov	Dec	Year
Mean No. of days with Maximum temperature => 90.0 °F (32.2 °C)	0	0	0	0	1	3	5	3	1	0	0	0	13
Mean No. of days with Minimum temperature => 68.0 °F (20.0 °C)	0	0	0	0	1	5	10	8	2	0	0	0	25
Mean No. of days with Minimum temperature <= 32.0 °F (0.0 °C)	27	25	21	6	0	0	0	0	0	2	14	24	120
Mean No. of days with Maximum temperature <= 32.0 °F (0.0 °C)	16	12	3	0	0	0	0	0	0	0	1	10	42
Mean No. of days with snow depth => 0.1 in (0.25 cm)	17	14	6	1	0	0	0	0	0	0	2	8	48
Average sea temperature °F (°C)	33.6 (0.9)	32.7 (0.4)	33.4 (0.8)	39.7 (4.3)	48.9 (9.4)	63.9 (17.7)	74.7 (23.7)	75.4 (24.1)	70.5 (21.4)	60.3 (15.7)	48.6 (9.2)	38.1 (3.4)	51.7 (10.9)
Mean daily daylight hours	9.0	11.0	12.0	13.0	15.0	15.0	15.0	14.0	12.0	11.0	10.0	9.0	12.2
Average Ultraviolet index	1	2	4	6	7	8	9	8	6	4	2	1	4.8
Source 1: NWS (1991–2020)
Source 2 : Weather Atlas (daylight-UV-water temperature)

== Demographics ==
Historical population
Census	Pop.	Note	%±
1820	1,422		—
1830	2,222		56.3%
1840	9,102		309.6%
1850	21,019		130.9%
1860	45,619		117.0%
1870	79,577		74.4%
1880	116,340		46.2%
1890	205,876		77.0%
1900	285,704		38.8%
1910	465,766		63.0%
1920	993,678		113.3%
1930	1,568,662		57.9%
1940	1,623,452		3.5%
1950	1,849,568		13.9%
1960	1,670,144		−9.7%
1970	1,511,482		−9.5%
1980	1,203,368		−20.4%
1990	1,027,974		−14.6%
2000	951,270		−7.5%
2010	713,777		−25.0%
2020	639,111		−10.5%
2025 (est.)	649,095	▲	1.6%
U.S. Decennial Census; 2010–2020

Detroit is the center of a three-county urban area (with a population of 3,776,890 within an area of 1,337 square miles (3,460 km^{2}) according to the 2020 census), six-county metropolitan statistical area (population of 5,322,219 in an area of 3,913 square miles [10,130 km^{2}] as of the 2010 census), and a nine-county Combined Statistical Area (population of 5.3 million within 5,814 square miles [15,060 km^{2}] as of 2010).

In the 2020 United States census, the city had 639,111 residents, ranking it the 27th-most populous city in the US. Of the large shrinking cities in the US, Detroit has had the most dramatic decline in the population of the past 70 years (down 1,210,457) and the second-largest percentage decline (down 65.4%). While the drop in Detroit's population has been ongoing since 1950, the most dramatic period was the significant 25% decline between the 2000 and 2010 census.

The population density was 5,144.3 people per square mile (1,986.2 people/km^{2}). There were 349,170 housing units at an average density of 2,516.5 units per square mile (971.6 units/km^{2}).

=== Race, ethnicity, and religion ===
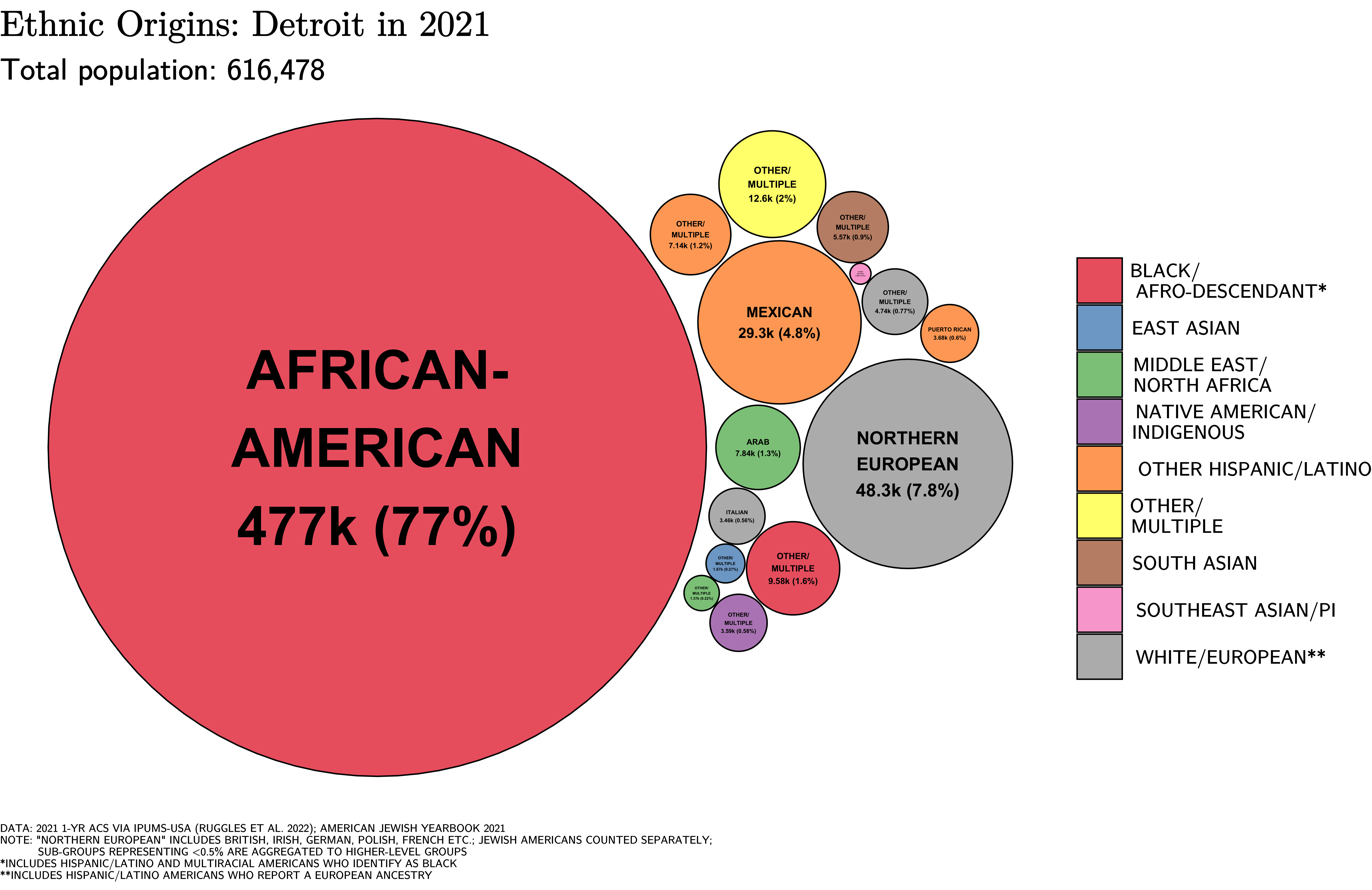
Ethnic origins in Detroit

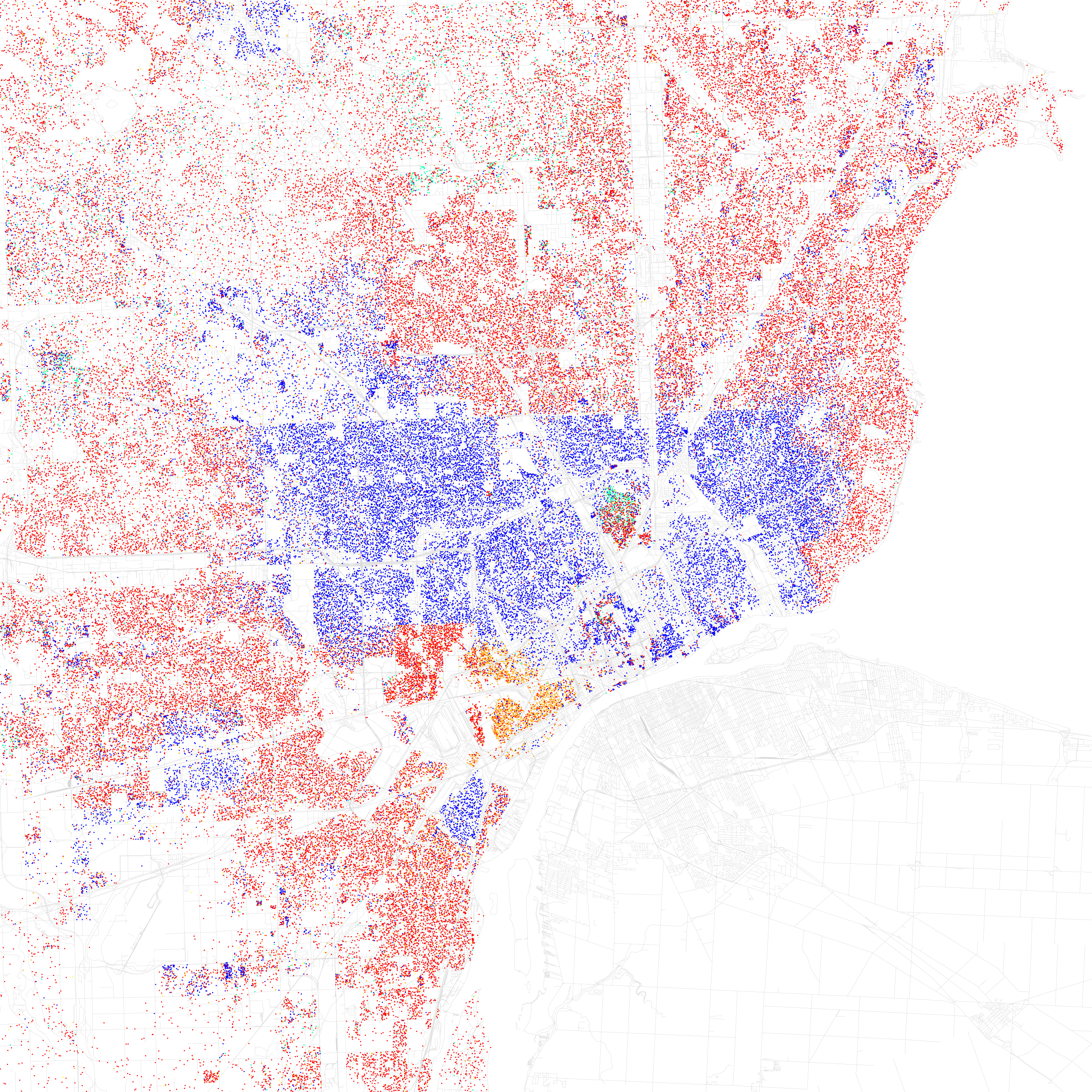
Map of racial distribution in Detroit, 2010 U.S. Census. Each dot is 25 people: ⬤ White ⬤ Black ⬤ Asian ⬤ Hispanic ⬤ Other

Beginning with the rise of the automobile industry, Detroit's population increased more than sixfold during the first half of the 20th century as an influx of European (Polish, German), Middle Eastern (Lebanese, Assyrian), and Southern migrants brought their families to the city. With this economic boom following World War I, the African American population grew from a mere 6,000 in 1910 to more than 120,000 by 1930. Perhaps one of the most overt examples of neighborhood discrimination occurred in 1925 when African American physician Ossian Sweet found his home surrounded by an angry mob of his hostile white neighbors violently protesting his new move into a traditionally white neighborhood. Sweet and ten of his family members and friends were put on trial for murder as one of the mob members throwing rocks at the newly purchased house was shot and killed by someone firing out of a second-floor window.

Detroit has a relatively large Mexican-American population. In the early 20th century, thousands of Mexicans came to Detroit to work in agricultural, automotive, and steel jobs. During the Mexican Repatriation of the 1930s many Mexicans in Detroit were willingly repatriated or forced to repatriate. By the 1940s much of the Mexican community began to settle what is now Mexicantown. Immigration from Jalisco significantly increased the Latino population in the 1990s. By 2010 Detroit had 48,679 Hispanics, including 36,452 Mexicans: a 70% increase from 1990. Per the 2023 American Community Survey five-year estimates, the Mexican American population was 35,273 comprising over 75% of the Latino population with Puerto Ricans as the next largest group at 5,887.

After World War II, an influx of Appalachian migrants formed communities with children raised with acquired southern accents, Along with Lithuanians in the World War II era, concentrating in the city's Southwest side in the West Vernor area, where the renovated Lithuanian Hall reopened in 2006.

While African Americans in 2020 comprised 13.5% of Michigan's population, they made up nearly 77.2% of Detroit's population. The next largest population groups were non-Hispanic whites, at 10.1%, and Hispanics, at 8.0%. In 2001, 103,000 Jews, or about 1.9% of the population, were living in the Detroit area. According to the 2010 census, segregation in Detroit decreased in absolute and relative terms and in the first decade of the 21st century, about two-thirds of the total black population in the metropolitan area resided within the city limits of Detroit. The number of integrated neighborhoods increased from 100 in 2000 to 204 in 2010. After being ranked the most segregated metropolitan area in the United States in 2000, Detroit was ranked fourth most-segregated in 2010. A 2011 op-ed in The New York Times attributed the decreased segregation rating to the overall exodus from the city, cautioning that these areas may soon become more segregated.

There are four areas of Detroit with significant Asian and Asian American populations. Northeast Detroit has a large population of Hmong with a smaller group of Lao people. A portion of Detroit next to eastern Hamtramck includes Bangladeshi Americans, Indian Americans, and Pakistani Americans; nearly all of the Bangladeshi population in Detroit lives in that area. The area north of downtown has transient Asian national origin residents who are university students or hospital workers. Few of them have permanent residency after schooling ends. They are mostly Chinese and Indian but the population also includes Filipinos, Koreans, and Pakistanis. In Southwest and western Detroit there are smaller, scattered Asian communities.

According to a 2014 study, 67% of the population of the city identified themselves as Christians, with 49% professing adherence to Protestant churches, and 16% professing Roman Catholic beliefs, while 24% claim no religious affiliation. Other religions collectively make up about 8% of the population.

Demographic profile	2020	2010	2000	1990	1980	1970	1960	1950	1940	1930	1920	1910
Black or African American	77.7%	82.7%	—N/a	75.7%	—N/a	43.7%	—N/a	16.2%	9.2%	7.7%	4.1%	1.2%
—Non-Hispanic	77.2%	82.2%	81.2%	75.4%	62.7%	43.7%	28.9%	—N/a	—N/a	—N/a	—N/a	—N/a
White	14.7%	10.6%	—N/a	21.6%	—N/a	55.5%	—N/a	83.6%	90.7%	92.2%	95.8%	98.7%
—Non-Hispanic	10.1%	7.8%	10.5%	20.7%	33.4%	55.5%	70.8%	—N/a	90.4%	—N/a	—N/a	—N/a
Hispanic or Latino (of any race)	8.0%	6.8%	5.0%	2.8%	2.4%	1.8%	—N/a	—N/a	0.3%	—N/a	—N/a	—N/a
Asian	1.6%	1.1%	—N/a	0.8%	—N/a	0.3%	—N/a	0.1%	0.1%	0.1%	0.1%	—N/a
—Non-Hispanic	1.6%	1.0%	1.0%	0.8%	0.5%	0.5%	0.3%	—N/a	—N/a	—N/a	—N/a	—N/a
Native American or Alaska Native alone (NH)	0.22%	0.27%	0.27%	0.32%	0.28%	—N/a	—N/a	—N/a	—N/a	—N/a	—N/a	—N/a
Pacific Islander or Native Hawaiian alone (NH)	0.02%	0.01%	0.02%	—N/a	0.02%	—N/a	—N/a	—N/a	—N/a	—N/a	—N/a	—N/a
Other race alone (NH)	0.48%	0.14%	0.18%	0.13%	0.67%	0.32%	0.04%	—N/a	—N/a	—N/a	—N/a	—N/a
Mixed race or Multiracial (NH)	3.00%	1.75%	1.96%	—N/a	—N/a	—N/a	—N/a	—N/a	—N/a	—N/a	—N/a	—N/a
Source: U.S. Census and IPUMS USA

=== Racial and ethnic composition ===
Detroit city, Michigan – Racial and ethnic composition Note: the US Census treats Hispanic/Latino as an ethnic category. This table excludes Latinos from the racial categories and assigns them to a separate category. Hispanics/Latinos may be of any race.
Race / Ethnicity (NH = Non-Hispanic)	Pop 1980	Pop 1990	Pop 2000	Pop 2010	Pop 2020	% 1980	% 1990	% 2000	% 2010	% 2020
White alone (NH)	402,077	212,278	99,921	55,604	60,770	33.41%	20.65%	10.50%	7.79%	9.51%
Black or African American alone (NH)	754,274	774,529	771,966	586,573	493,212	62.68%	75.35%	81.15%	82.18%	77.17%
Native American or Alaska Native alone (NH)	3,420	3,305	2,572	1,927	1,399	0.28%	0.32%	0.27%	0.27%	0.22%
Asian alone (NH)	6,621	8,085	9,135	7,436	10,085	0.55%	0.79%	0.96%	1.04%	1.58%
Native Hawaiian or Pacific Islander alone (NH)	x	x	169	82	111	x	x	0.02%	0.01%	0.02%
Other race alone (NH)	7,977	1,304	1,676	994	3,066	0.66%	0.13%	0.18%	0.14%	0.48%
Mixed race or Multiracial (NH)	x	x	18,664	12,482	19,199	x	x	1.96%	1.75%	3.00%
Hispanic or Latino (any race)	28,970	28,473	47,167	48,679	51,269	2.41%	2.77%	4.96%	6.82%	8.02%
Total	1,203,339	1,027,974	951,270	713,777	639,111	100.00%	100.00%	100.00%	100.00%	100.00%

=== Age and gender ===
Population pyramid of Detroit in 2021

There was a wide distribution of age in the city, with 31.1% under the age of 18, 9.7% from 18 to 24, 29.5% from 25 to 44, 19.3% from 45 to 64, and 10.4% 65 years of age or older. The median age was 31 years. For every 100 females, there were 89.1 males. For every 100 females age 18 and over, there were 83.5 males.

=== Households and income ===
Detroit's 639,111 residents represent 269,445 households, and 162,924 families residing in the city. Of the 269,445 households, 34.4% had children under the age of 18 living with them, 21.5% were married couples living together, 31.4% had a female householder with no husband present, 39.5% were non-families, 34.0% were made up of individuals, and 3.9% had someone living alone who was 65 years of age or older. The average household size was 2.59, and the average family size was 3.36.

The loss of industrial and working-class jobs in the city has resulted in high rates of poverty and associated problems. From 2000 to 2009, the city's estimated median household income fell from $29,526 to $26,098. As of 2010, the mean income of Detroit is below the overall U.S. average by several thousand dollars. Of every three Detroit residents, one lives in poverty. Luke Bergmann, author of Getting Ghost: Two Young Lives and the Struggle for the Soul of an American City, said in 2010, "Detroit is now one of the poorest big cities in the country".

In the 2018 American Community Survey, median household income in the city was $31,283, compared with the median for Michigan of $56,697. The median income for a family was $36,842, well below the state median of $72,036. 33.4% of families had income at or below the federally defined poverty level. Out of the total population, 47.3% of those under the age of 18 and 21.0% of those 65 and older had income at or below the federally defined poverty line.

The city of Detroit has a higher than average percentage of households without a car. In 2016, 24.7% of Detroit households lacked a car, much higher than the national average of 8.7%. Detroit averaged 1.15 cars per household in 2016, compared to a national average of 1.8.

Income in Detroit (as of July 1, 2024)
Area	Number of households	Median household income	Per Capita Income	Poverty rate
Detroit City	257,998 (▲)	$39,938 (▲)	$24,594 (▲)	32.7% (▼)
Wayne County, MI	700,591	$60,539	$34,906	22.1%
Michigan	4,076,369	$72,875	$40,735	13.4%
United States	129,227,496	$80,734	$44,673	10.6%

=== Crime ===
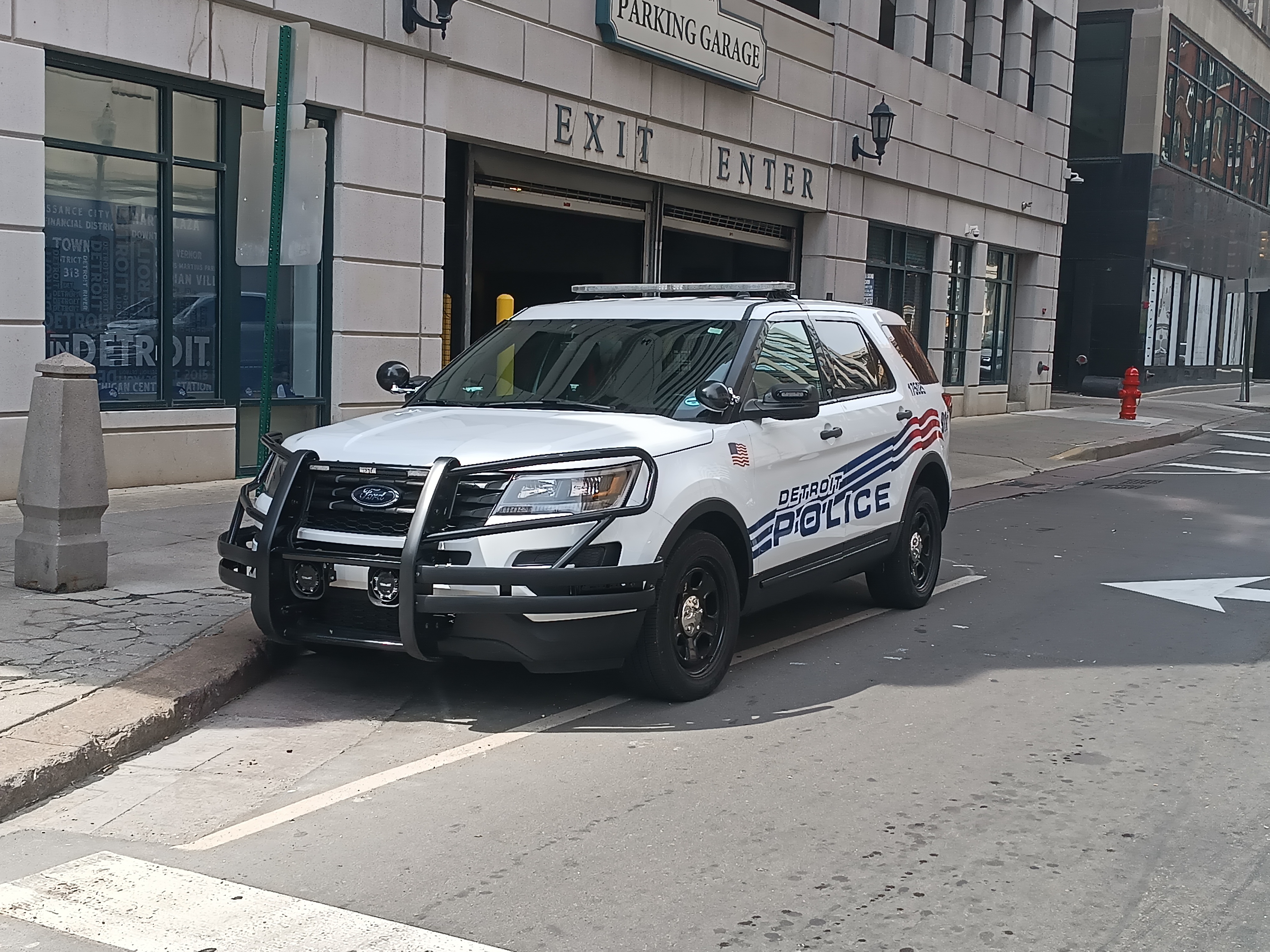
A 2025 Ford Police Interceptor

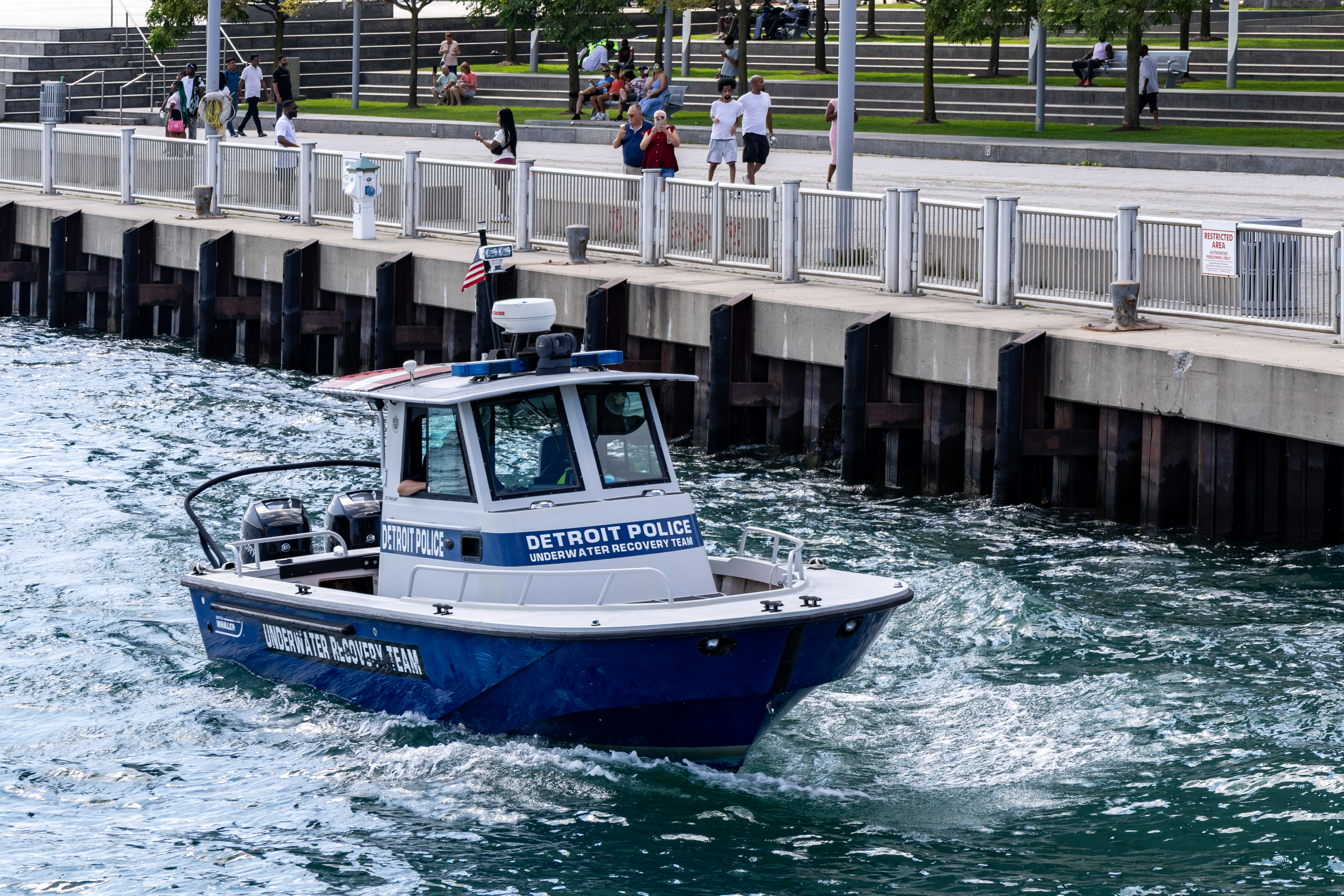
Detroit Police Underwater Recovery Team boat

Detroit has gained notoriety for its high amount of crime, having struggled with it for decades. The number of homicides in 1974 was 714. The homicide rate in 2022 was the third highest in the nation at 50.0 per 100,000. Downtown typically has lower crime than national and state averages. According to a 2007 analysis, Detroit officials note about 65 to 70 percent of homicides in the city were drug related, with the rate of unsolved murders roughly 70%.

Although the rate of violent crime dropped 11% in 2008, violent crime in Detroit has not declined as much as the national average from 2007 to 2011. The violent crime rate is one of the highest in the United States. NeighborhoodScout reported a crime rate of 62.18 per 1,000 residents for property crimes, and 16.73 per 1,000 for violent crimes (compared to national figures of 32 per 1,000 for property crimes and 5 per 1,000 for violent crime in 2008). In 2012, crime in the city was among the reasons for more expensive car insurance.

Areas of the city adjacent to the Detroit River are also patrolled by the United States Border Patrol.

== Economy ==
Several major corporations are based in the city, including three Fortune 500 companies. The most heavily represented sectors are manufacturing (particularly automotive), finance, technology, and health care. The most significant companies based in Detroit include General Motors, Rocket Mortgage, Ally Financial, Compuware, Shinola, American Axle, Little Caesars, DTE Energy, Lowe Campbell Ewald, Blue Cross Blue Shield of Michigan, and Rossetti Architects.

About 80,500 people work in downtown Detroit, comprising one-fifth of the city's employment base. Aside from the numerous Detroit-based companies listed above, downtown contains large offices for Comerica, Stellantis (formerly Chrysler), Fifth Third Bank, HP Enterprise, Deloitte, PricewaterhouseCoopers, KPMG, and Ernst & Young. Ford Motor Company is in the adjacent city of Dearborn.

Hudson's Detroit, completed in 2025, is the city's second-tallest skyscraper.

Detroit Financial District

Thousands more employees work in Midtown, north of the central business district. Midtown's anchors are the city's largest single employer Detroit Medical Center, Wayne State University, and the Henry Ford Health System in New Center. Midtown is also home to watchmaker Shinola and an array of small and startup companies. New Center bases TechTown, a research and business incubator hub that is part of the Wayne State University system. Like downtown, Corktown Is experiencing growth with the new Ford Corktown Campus under development.

Many downtown employers are relatively new, as there has been a marked trend of companies moving from satellite suburbs into the downtown core. Compuware completed its world headquarters in downtown in 2003. OnStar, Blue Cross Blue Shield, and HP Enterprise Services are at the Renaissance Center. PricewaterhouseCoopers Plaza offices are adjacent to Ford Field, and Ernst & Young completed its office building at One Kennedy Square in 2006. Perhaps most prominently, in 2010, Quicken Loans, one of the largest mortgage lenders, relocated its world headquarters and 4,000 employees to downtown Detroit, consolidating its suburban offices. In July 2012, the U.S. Patent and Trademark Office opened its Elijah J. McCoy Satellite Office in the Rivertown/Warehouse District as its first location outside Washington, D.C.'s metropolitan area.

In April 2014, the United States Department of Labor reported the city's unemployment rate at 14.5%. In 2023 the city of Detroit reported a poverty rate of 33.8%.

The city of Detroit and other public–private partnerships have attempted to catalyze the region's growth by facilitating the building and historical rehabilitation of residential high-rises in the downtown, creating a zone that offers many business tax incentives, creating recreational spaces such as the Detroit RiverWalk, Campus Martius Park, Dequindre Cut Greenway, and Green Alleys in Midtown. The city has cleared sections of land while retaining some historically significant vacant buildings to spur redevelopment; even though it has struggled with finances, the city issued bonds in 2008 to provide funding for ongoing work to demolish blighted properties. Two years earlier, downtown reported $1.3 billion in restorations and new developments which increased the number of construction jobs in the city. In the decade prior to 2006, downtown gained more than $15 billion in new investment from private and public sectors.

Despite the city's recent financial issues, many developers remain unfazed by Detroit's problems. Midtown is one of the most successful areas within Detroit to have a residential occupancy rate of 96%. Numerous developments have been recently completed or are in various stages of construction. These include the $82 million reconstruction of downtown's David Whitney Building (now an Aloft Hotel and luxury residences), the Woodward Garden Block Development in Midtown, the residential conversion of the David Broderick Tower in downtown, the rehabilitation of the Book Cadillac Hotel (now a Westin and luxury condos) and Fort Shelby Hotel (now Doubletree) also in downtown, and various smaller projects.

Downtown's population of young professionals is growing, and retail is expanding. A study in 2007 found out that Downtown's new residents are predominantly young professionals (57% are ages 25 to 34, 45% have bachelor's degrees, and 34% have a master's or professional degree), a trend which has hastened over the last decade. Since 2006, $9 billion has been invested in downtown and surrounding neighborhoods; $5.2 billion of which has come in 2013 and 2014. Construction activity, particularly rehabilitation of historic downtown buildings, has increased markedly. As of 2014, the number of vacant downtown buildings has dropped from nearly 50 to around 13.

In 2013 Meijer, a midwestern retail chain, opened its first supercenter store in Detroit; this was a $20 million, 190,000-square-foot store in the northern portion of the city and it also is the centerpiece of a new $72 million shopping center named Gateway Marketplace. In 2015 Meijer opened its second supercenter store in the city. In 2019 JPMorgan Chase announced plans to invest $50 million more in affordable housing, job training, and entrepreneurship by the end of 2022, growing its investment to $200 million.

Near Zug Island, the southwest part of the city was developed over a 1,500-acre (610 ha) salt mine that is 1,100 feet (340 m) below the surface. The Detroit salt mine run by the Detroit Salt Company has over 100 miles (160 km) of roads within.

== Arts and culture ==
In the central portions of Detroit, the population of young professionals, artists, and other transplants is growing and retail is expanding. This dynamic is luring additional new residents, and former residents returning from other cities, to the city's Downtown along with the revitalized Midtown and New Center areas.

=== Music ===
Live music has been a prominent feature of Detroit's nightlife since the late 1940s, bringing the city recognition under the nickname "Motown". The metropolitan area has many nationally prominent live music venues. Concerts hosted by Live Nation perform throughout the Detroit area. The theater venue circuit is the United States' second largest and hosts Broadway performances.

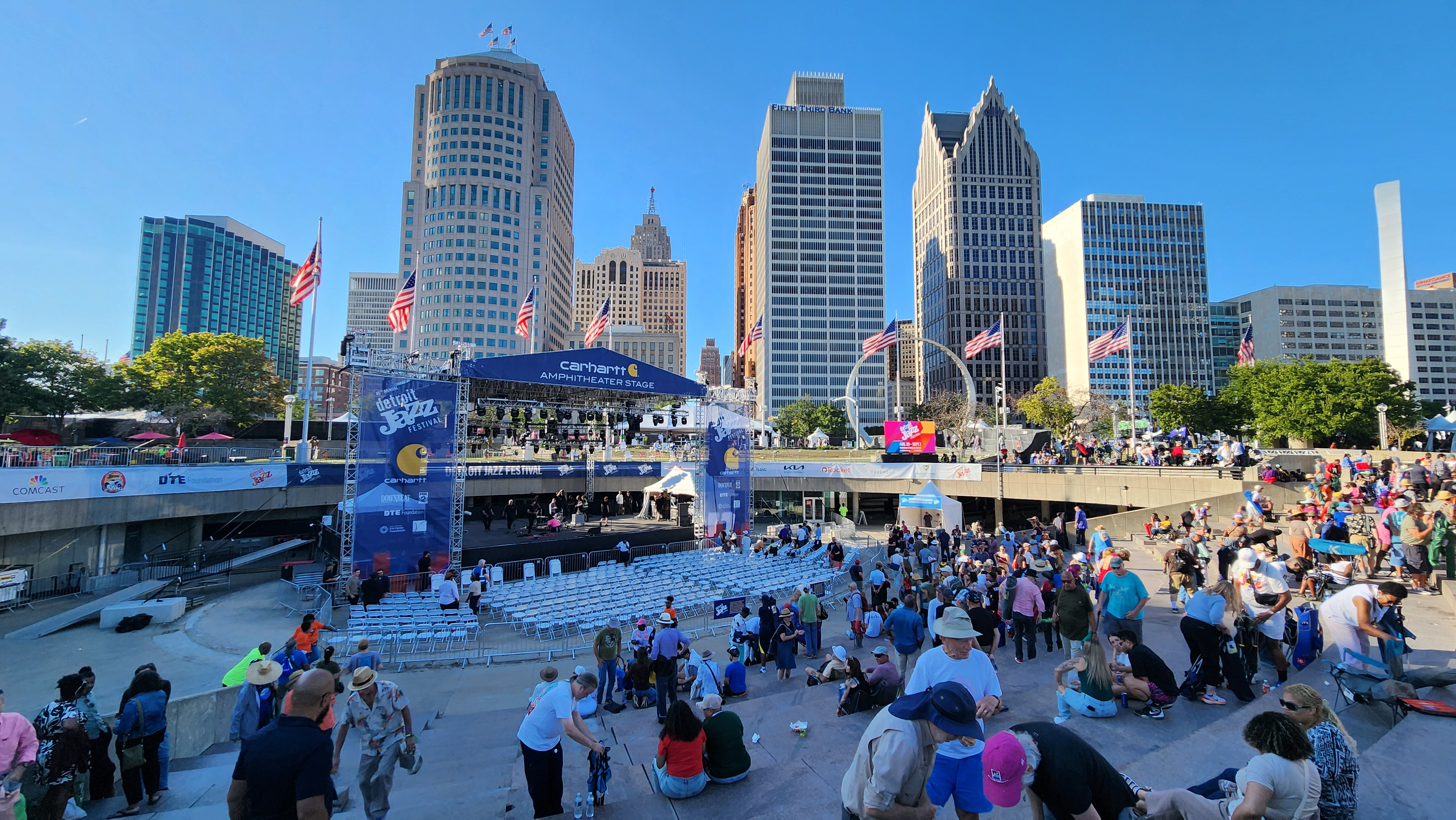
2025 Detroit International Jazz Festival

The city has a rich musical heritage and has contributed to many genres over the decades. Important music events include the Detroit International Jazz Festival, the Detroit Electronic Music Festival, the Motor City Music Conference (MC2), the Urban Organic Music Conference, the Concert of Colors, and the hip-hop Summer Jamz festival.

In the 1940s, Detroit blues artist John Lee Hooker became a long-term resident in the Delray neighborhood. Hooker, among other important blues musicians, migrated from his home in Mississippi, bringing the Delta blues to Detroit. Hooker recorded for Fortune Records, the biggest pre-Motown blues/soul label. During the 1950s, the city became a center for jazz, with stars performing in the Black Bottom neighborhood. Prominent emerging jazz musicians included trumpeter Donald Byrd (who attended Cass Tech and performed with Art Blakey and the Jazz Messengers early in his career) and saxophonist Pepper Adams (who enjoyed a solo career and accompanied Byrd on several albums). The Graystone International Jazz Museum documents jazz in Detroit.

Other prominent Motor City R&B stars in the 1950s and early 1960s were Nolan Strong, Andre Williams, and Nathaniel Mayer—who all scored local and national hits on the Fortune Records label. According to Smokey Robinson, Strong was a primary influence on his voice as a teenager. The Fortune label, a family-operated label on Third Avenue, was owned by the husband-and-wife team of Jack Brown and Devora Brown. Fortune—which also released country, gospel and rockabilly LPs and 45s—laid the groundwork for Motown, which became Detroit's most legendary record label.

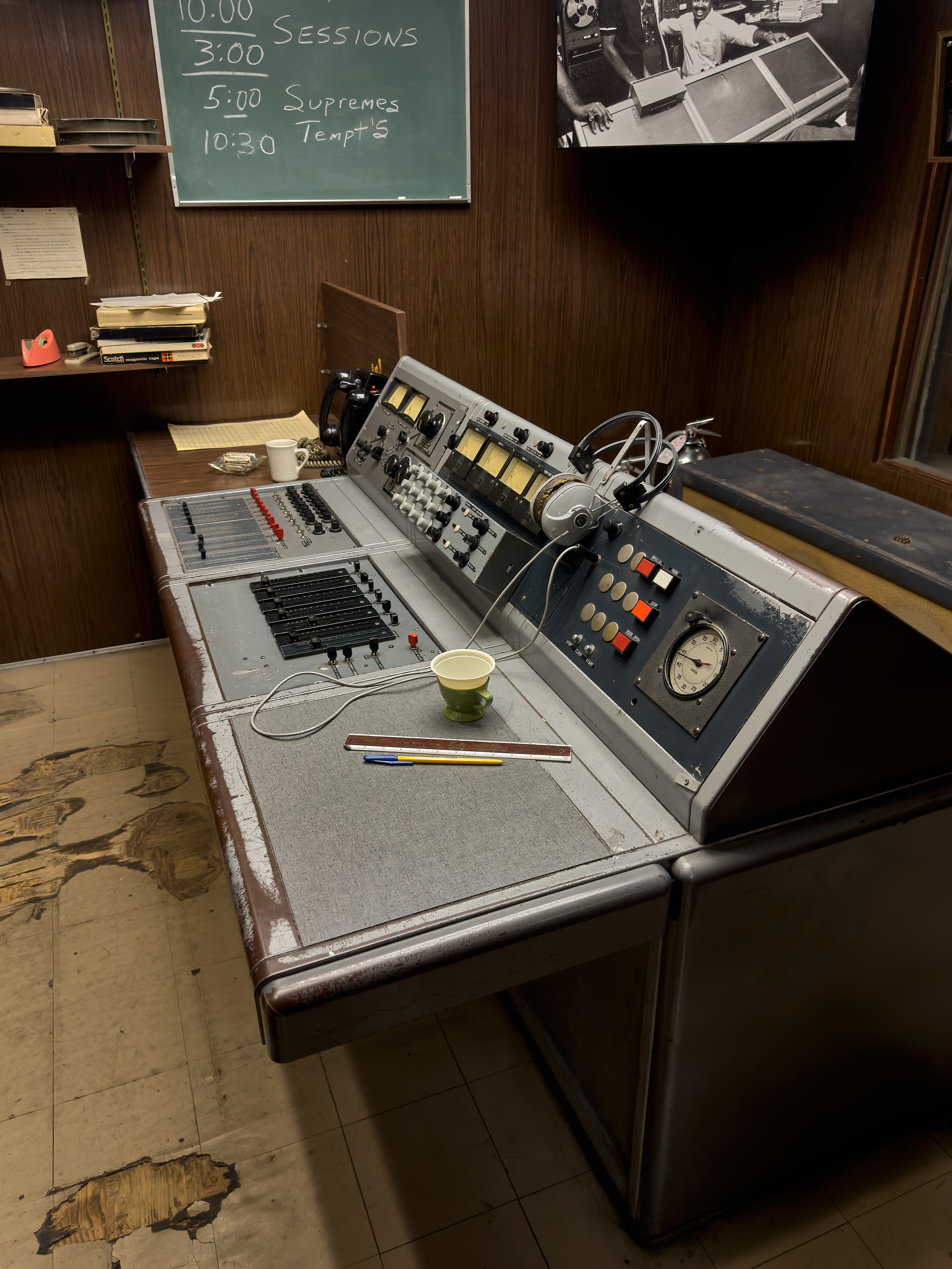
Studio A control room in the Hitsville U.S.A. building on W. Grand Boulevard. This building was Motown's first headquarters and recording studio.

Berry Gordy, Jr. founded Motown Records, which rose to prominence during the 1960s and early 1970s with acts such as Stevie Wonder, the Temptations, the Four Tops, Smokey Robinson & the Miracles, Diana Ross & the Supremes, the Jackson 5, Martha and the Vandellas, the Spinners, Gladys Knight & the Pips, the Marvelettes, the Elgins, the Monitors, the Velvelettes, and Marvin Gaye. Artists were backed by in-house vocalists the Andantes and the Funk Brothers.

"The Motown sound" played an important role in the crossover appeal with popular music, since it was the first African American–owned record label to primarily feature African-American artists. Gordy moved Motown to Los Angeles in 1972 to pursue film production, but the company has since returned to Detroit. Aretha Franklin, another Detroit R&B star, carried the Motown sound; however, she did not record with Berry's Motown label.

Local artists and bands rose to prominence in the 1960s and 70s, including the MC5, Glenn Frey, the Stooges, Bob Seger, Amboy Dukes featuring Ted Nugent, Mitch Ryder and The Detroit Wheels, Rare Earth, Alice Cooper, and Suzi Quatro. The group Kiss emphasized the city's connection with rock in the song "Detroit Rock City" and the movie produced in 1999. In the 1980s, Detroit was an important center of the hardcore punk rock underground with many nationally known bands coming out of the city and its suburbs, such as the Necros, the Meatmen, and Negative Approach.

In the 1990s and 2000s, the city produced many influential hip-hop artists, including Eminem, the hip-hop artist with the highest cumulative sales, his rap group D12, hip-hop rapper and producer Royce da 5'9", hip-hop producer Denaun Porter, hip-hop producer J Dilla, rapper and musician Kid Rock and rappers Big Sean and Danny Brown. The band Sponge toured and produced music. The city also has an active garage rock scene that has generated national attention with acts such as the White Stripes, the Von Bondies, the Detroit Cobras, the Dirtbombs, Electric Six, and the Hard Lessons. Detroit is cited as the birthplace of techno music in the early 1980s. The city also lends its name to an early and pioneering genre of electronic dance music, "Detroit techno". Featuring science fiction imagery and robotic themes, its futuristic style was greatly influenced by the geography of Detroit's urban decline and its industrial past. Prominent Detroit techno artists include Juan Atkins, Derrick May, Kevin Saunderson, and Jeff Mills. The Detroit Electronic Music Festival, now known as Movement, occurs annually in late May on Memorial Day Weekend, and takes place in Hart Plaza.

=== Performing arts ===
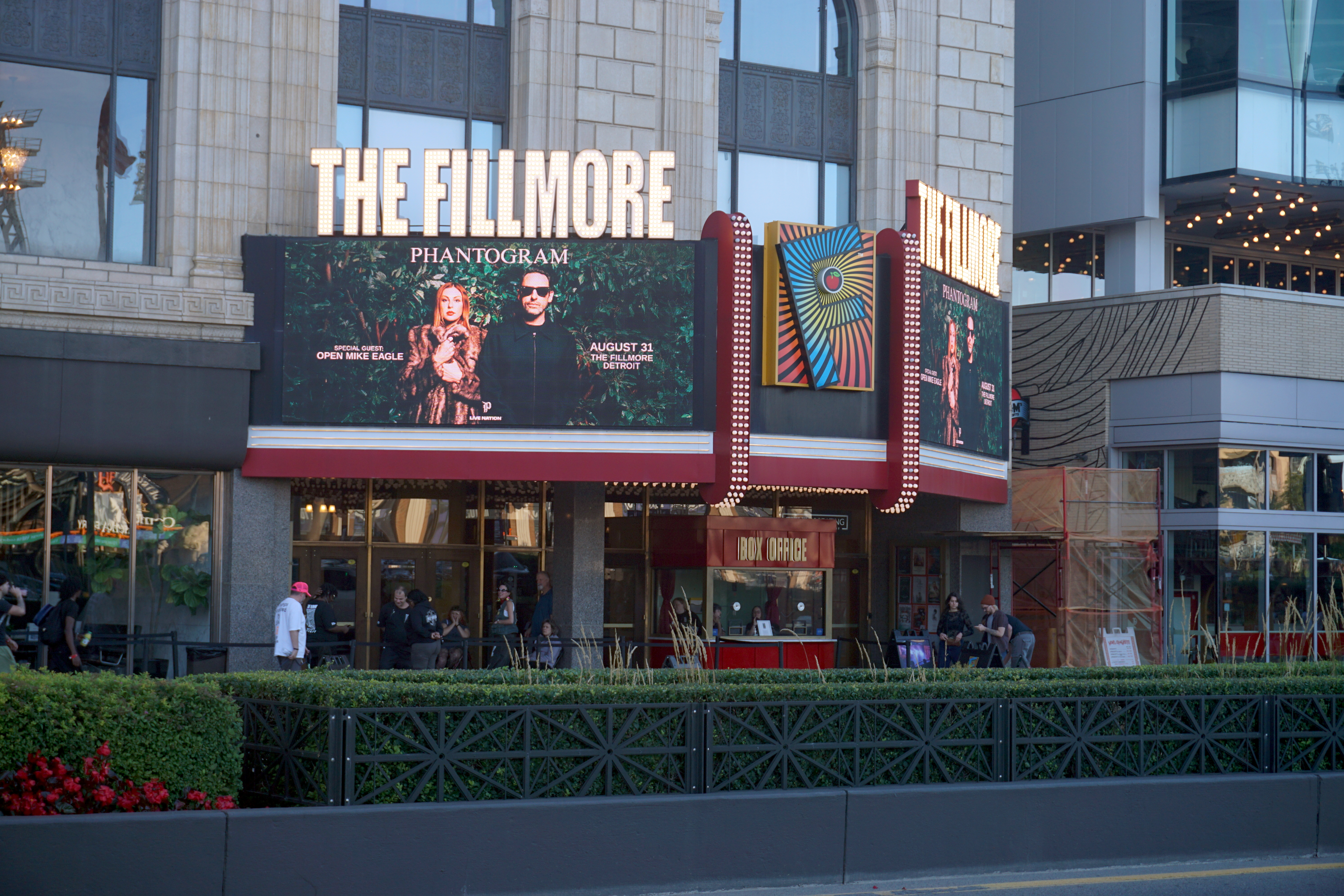
The Fillmore Detroit

Major theaters in Detroit include the Fox Theatre (5,174 seats), Music Hall Center for the Performing Arts (1,770 seats), the Gem Theatre (451 seats), Masonic Temple Theatre (4,404 seats), the Detroit Opera House (2,765 seats), the Fisher Theatre (2,089 seats), The Fillmore Detroit (2,200 seats), Saint Andrew's Hall, the Majestic Theater, and Orchestra Hall (2,286 seats), which hosts the renowned Detroit Symphony Orchestra. The Nederlander Organization, the largest controller of Broadway productions in New York City, originated with the purchase of the Detroit Opera House in 1922 by the Nederlander family.

Motown Motion Picture Studios with 535,000 square feet (49,700 m^{2}) produces movies in Detroit and the surrounding area based at the Pontiac Centerpoint Business Campus for a film industry expected to employ over 4,000 people in the metro area.

=== Tourist attractions ===
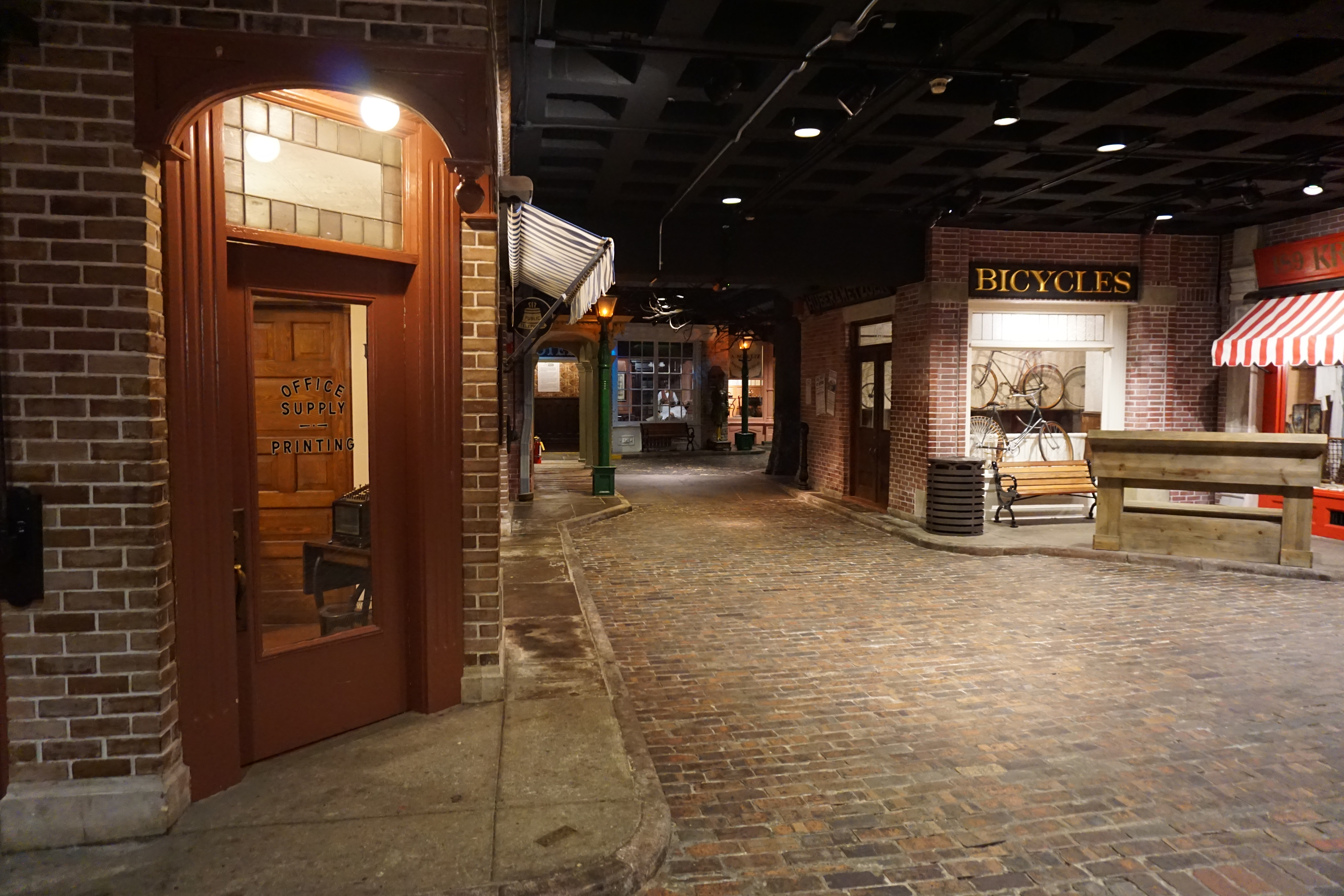
Detroit Historical Museum

Detroit is home to the world's first destination marketing organization, the Detroit Metro Convention and Visitor's Bureau, also known as Visit Detroit. Founded in 1896, the organization now operates at 211 West Fort Street as Visit Detroit.

Because of its unique culture, distinctive architecture, and revitalization and urban renewal efforts in the 21st century, Detroit has enjoyed increased prominence as a tourist destination in recent years. The New York Times listed Detroit as the ninth-best destination in its list of 52 Places to Go in 2017, while travel guide publisher Lonely Planet named Detroit the second-best city in the world to visit in 2018. Time named Detroit as one of the 50 World's Greatest Places of 2022 to explore.

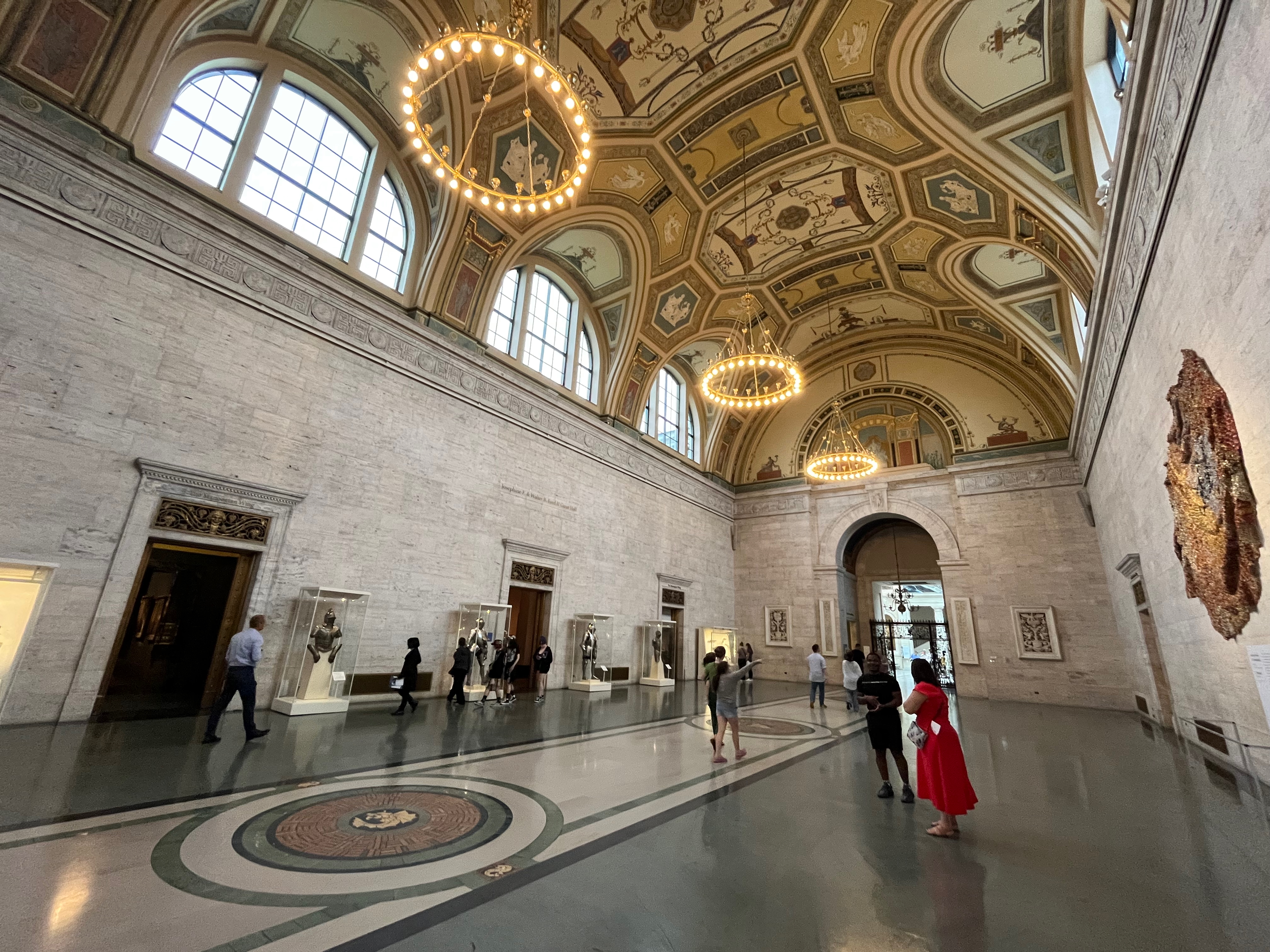
Detroit Institute of Arts

Many of the area's prominent museums are in the historic cultural center neighborhood around Wayne State University and the College for Creative Studies. These museums include the Detroit Institute of Arts, the Detroit Historical Museum, Charles H. Wright Museum of African American History, the Detroit Science Center, as well as the main branch of the Detroit Public Library. Other cultural highlights include Motown Historical Museum, the Ford Piquette Avenue Plant museum, the Pewabic Pottery studio and school, the Tuskegee Airmen Museum, Fort Wayne, the Dossin Great Lakes Museum, the Museum of Contemporary Art Detroit, the Contemporary Art Institute of Detroit, and the Belle Isle Conservatory.

In 2010, the G.R. N'Namdi Gallery opened in a 16,000-square-foot (1,500 m^{2}) complex in Midtown. Important history of America and the Detroit area are exhibited at The Henry Ford in Dearborn, the United States' largest indoor-outdoor museum complex. The Detroit Historical Society provides information about tours of area churches, skyscrapers, and mansions. Inside Detroit hosts tours, educational programming, and a downtown welcome center. Other sites of interest are the Detroit Zoo in Royal Oak, the Cranbrook Art Museum in Bloomfield Hills, the Anna Scripps Whitcomb Conservatory on Belle Isle, and Walter P. Chrysler Museum in Auburn Hills.

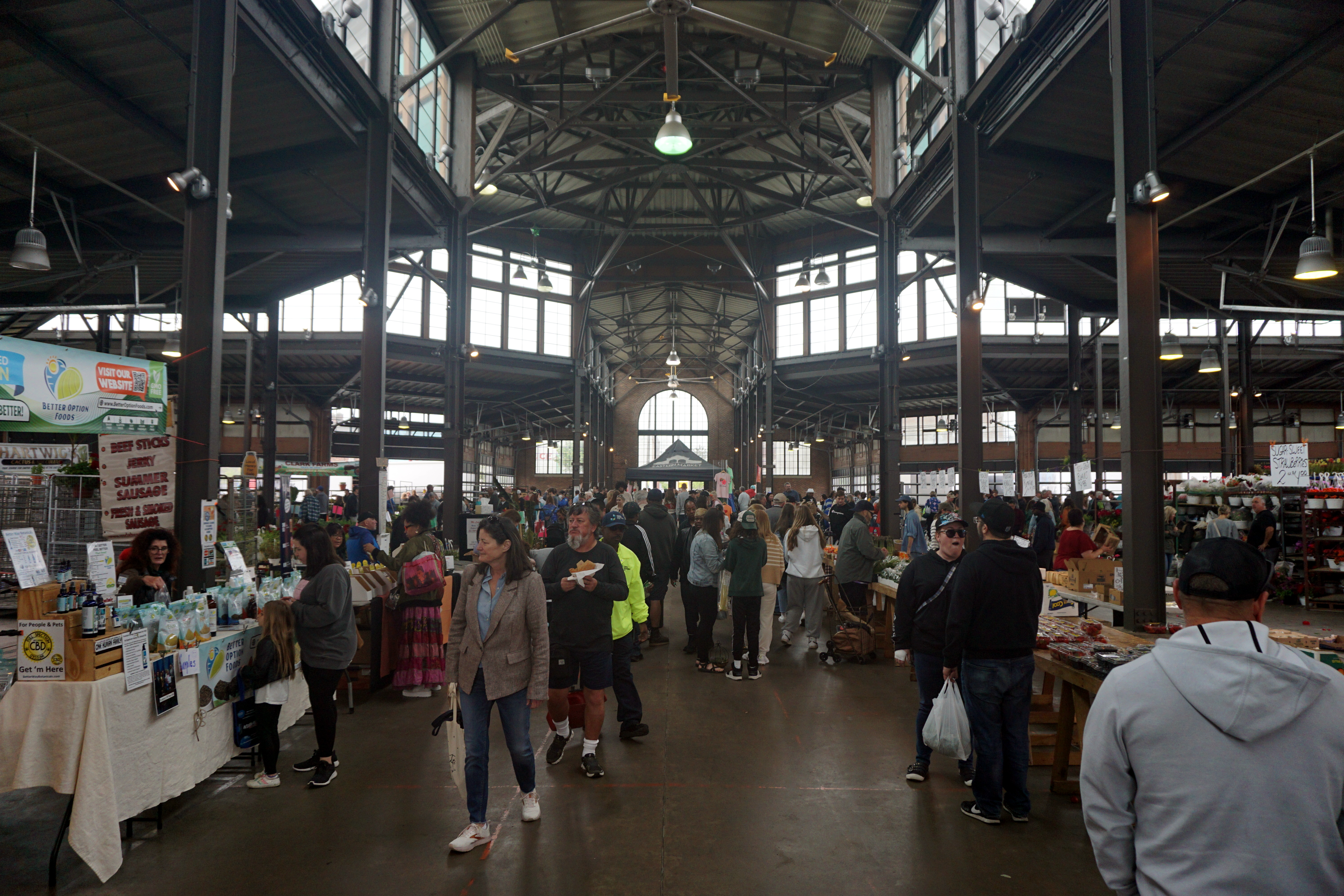
Eastern Market

Greektown and three downtown casino resort hotels serve as part of an entertainment hub. The Eastern Market farmer's distribution center is the largest open-air flowerbed market in the United States and has more than 150 foods and specialty businesses. On Saturdays, about 45,000 people shop there. The annual Detroit Festival of the Arts in Midtown draws about 350,000 people.

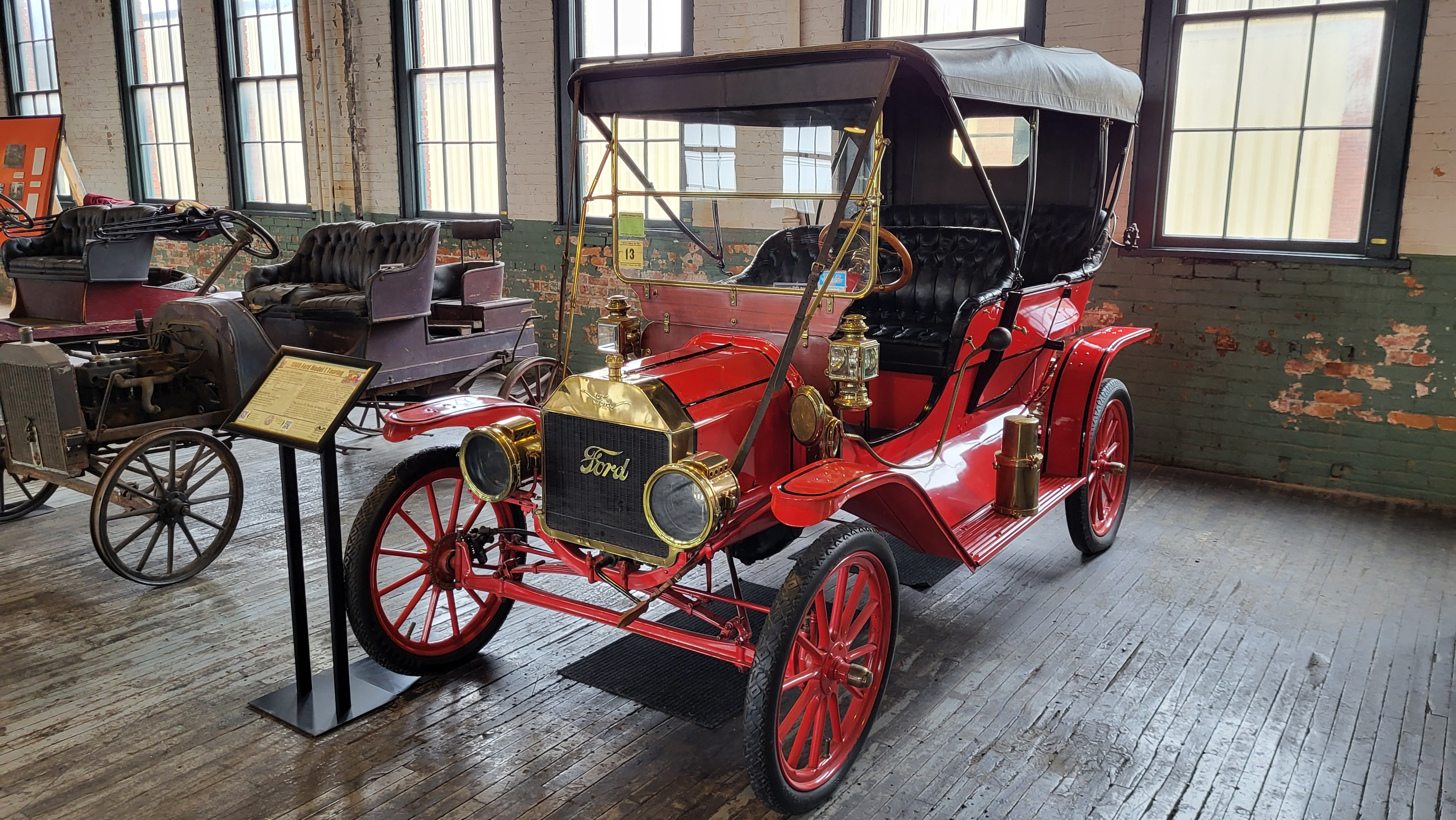
The Ford Piquette Avenue Plant, birthplace of the Ford Model T and the world's oldest car factory building open to the public

Annual summer events include the Electronic Music Festival, International Jazz Festival, the Woodward Dream Cruise, the African World Festival, the country music Hoedown, Noel Night, and Dally in the Alley. Within downtown, Campus Martius Park hosts large events, including the annual Motown Winter Blast. As the world's traditional automotive center, the city hosts the North American International Auto Show. Held since 1924, America's Thanksgiving Parade is one of the nation's largest. River Days, a five-day summer festival on the International Riverfront lead up to the Windsor–Detroit International Freedom Festival fireworks, which draw super sized-crowds ranging from hundreds of thousands to over three million people.

== Sports ==
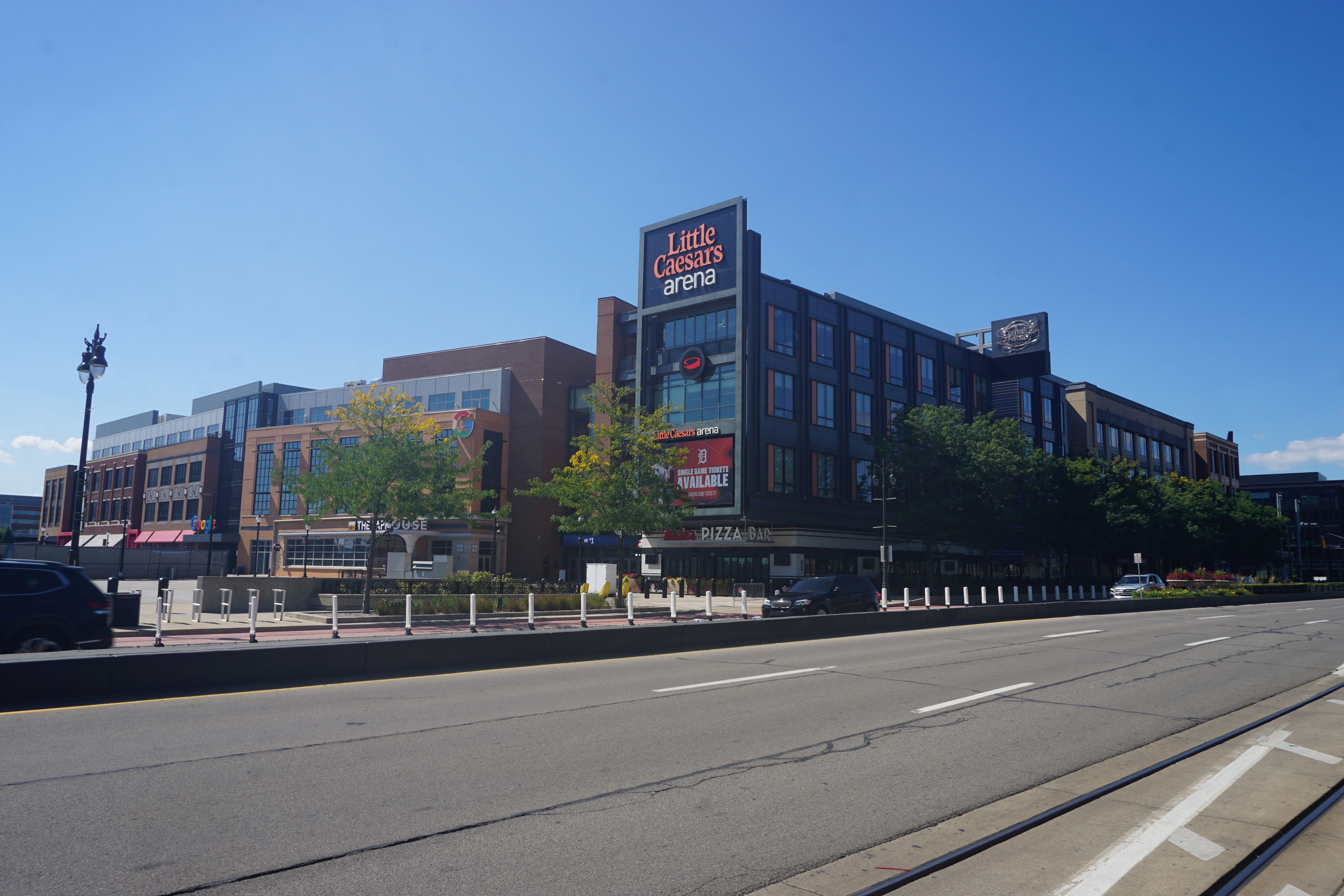
Little Caesars Arena, home of the Detroit Red Wings and the Detroit Pistons

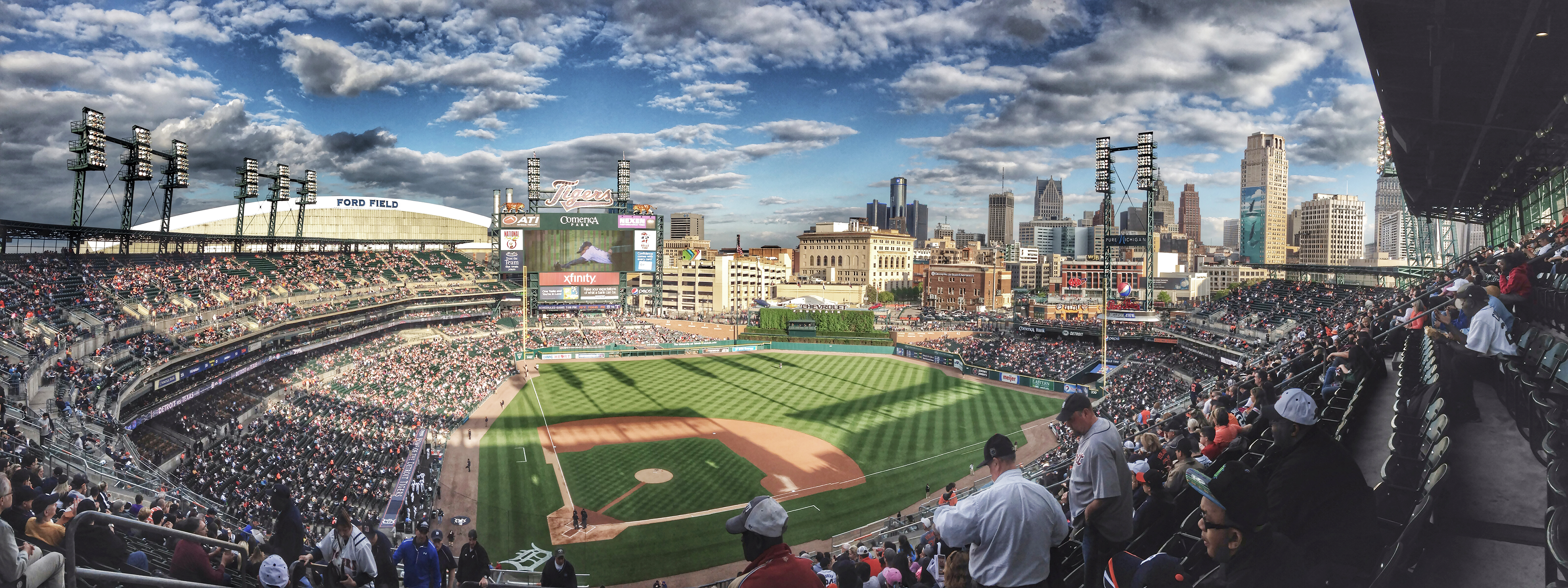
Comerica Park, home of the American League Detroit Tigers

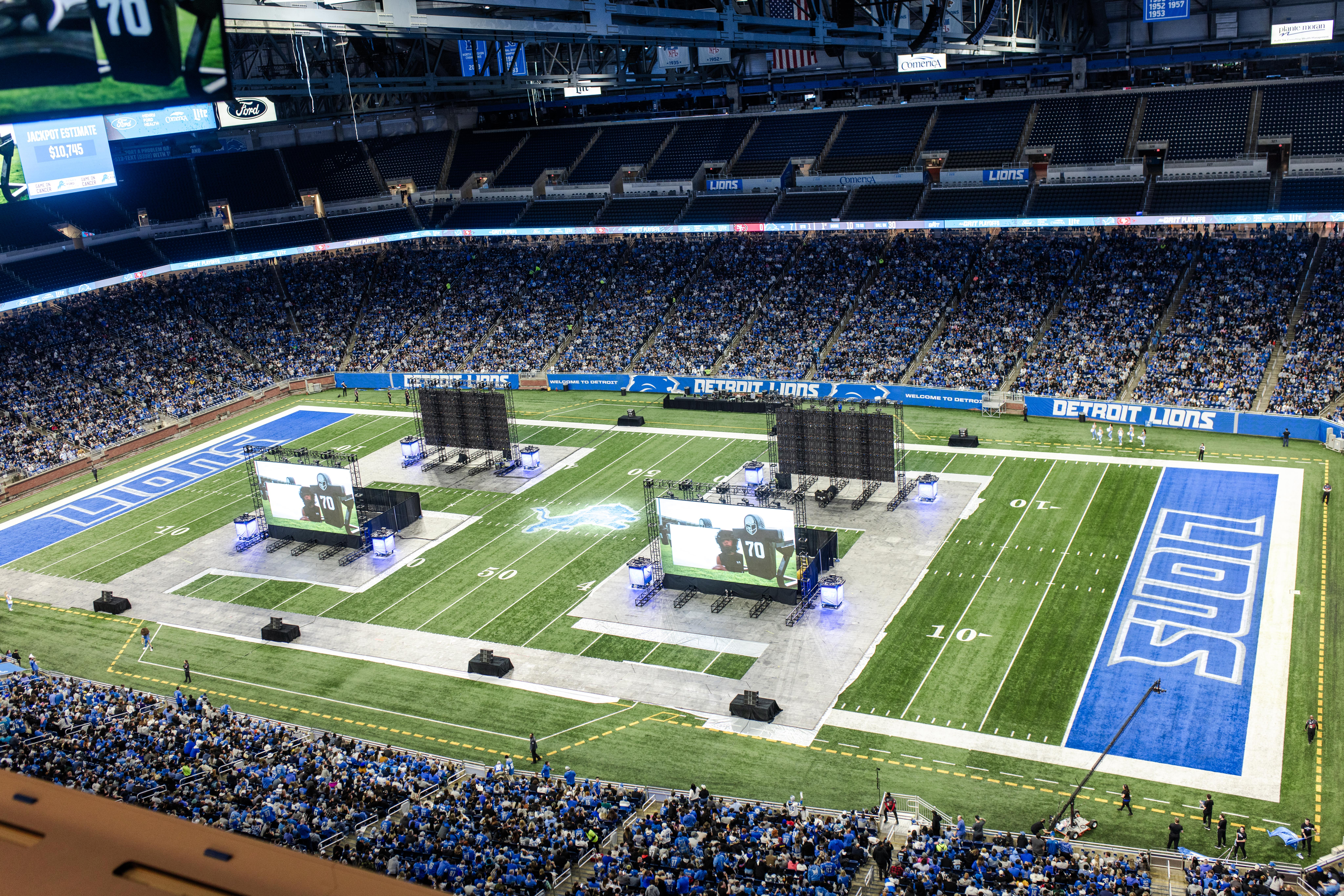
Ford Field, home of the Detroit Lions

Detroit is one of four U.S. cities that have venues within the city representing the four major sports in North America. Detroit is the only city to have its four major sports teams play within its downtown district. Detroit is also the only city that has a team in all "Big Four" leagues, but lacks an MLS team. Venues include: Comerica Park (home of Major League Baseball's Detroit Tigers), Ford Field (home of the National Football League's Detroit Lions), and Little Caesars Arena (home of the National Hockey League's Detroit Red Wings and the National Basketball Association's Detroit Pistons).

Detroit has won titles in all four of the major professional sports leagues. The Tigers have won four World Series titles (1935, 1945, 1968, and 1984). The Red Wings have won 11 Stanley Cups (1935–36, 1936–37, 1942–43, 1949–50, 1951–52, 1953–54, 1954–55, 1996–97, 1997–98, 2001–02, 2007–08) (the most by an American NHL franchise and also having the third most championships by an NHL team behind the Toronto Maple Leafs and Montreal Canadiens respectively). The Lions have won 4 NFL titles (1935, 1952, 1953, 1957). The Pistons have won three NBA titles (1989, 1990, 2004). In the years following the mid-1930s, Detroit was referred to as the "City of Champions" after the Tigers, Lions, and Red Wings captured the three major professional sports championships in existence at the time in a seven-month period (the Tigers won the World Series in October 1935; the Lions won the NFL championship in December 1935; the Red Wings won the Stanley Cup in April 1936).

Founded in 2012 as a semi-professional soccer club, Detroit City FC now plays professional soccer in the USL Championship. Nicknamed, Le Rouge, the club are two-time champions of NISA since joining in 2020. They play their home matches in Keyworth Stadium, which is located in the enclave of Hamtramck.

In college sports, Detroit's central location within the Mid-American Conference (MAC) has made it a frequent site for the league's championship events. While the MAC Basketball Tournament moved permanently to Cleveland starting in 2000, the MAC Football Championship Game has been played at Ford Field since 2004 and annually attracts 25,000 to 30,000 fans. The University of Detroit Mercy has an NCAA Division I program, and Wayne State University has both NCAA Division I and II programs. The NCAA football GameAbove Sports Bowl (formerly, Quick Lane Bowl) is held at Ford Field each December.

The city hosted the 2005 MLB All-Star Game, Super Bowl XL in 2006, the 2006 and 2012 World Series, WrestleMania 23 in 2007, and the NCAA Final Four in April 2009. The Detroit Indy Grand Prix is held in Belle Isle Park. In 2007, open-wheel racing returned to Belle Isle with both Indy Racing League and American Le Mans Series Racing. From 1982 to 1988, Detroit held the Detroit Grand Prix, at the Detroit street circuit.

Several notable athletes came from Detroit. In 1932, Eddie "The Midnight Express" Tolan from Detroit won the 100- and 200-meter races and two gold medals at the 1932 Summer Olympics. He was the first black athlete to win two Olympic gold medals. Joe Louis won the heavyweight championship of the world in 1937.

Detroit has made the most bids to host the Summer Olympics without ever being awarded the right to host the games, with seven unsuccessful bids submitted. Detroit bid for the 1944, 1952, 1956, 1960, 1964, 1968, and 1972 Summer Olympics, losing to London, Helsinki, Melbourne, Rome, Tokyo, Mexico City and Munich respectively.

In 2024, Detroit hosted the NFL draft. Over 775,000 people were present in downtown Detroit over the course of the three-day event, making it the highest attended draft on record.

== Government ==
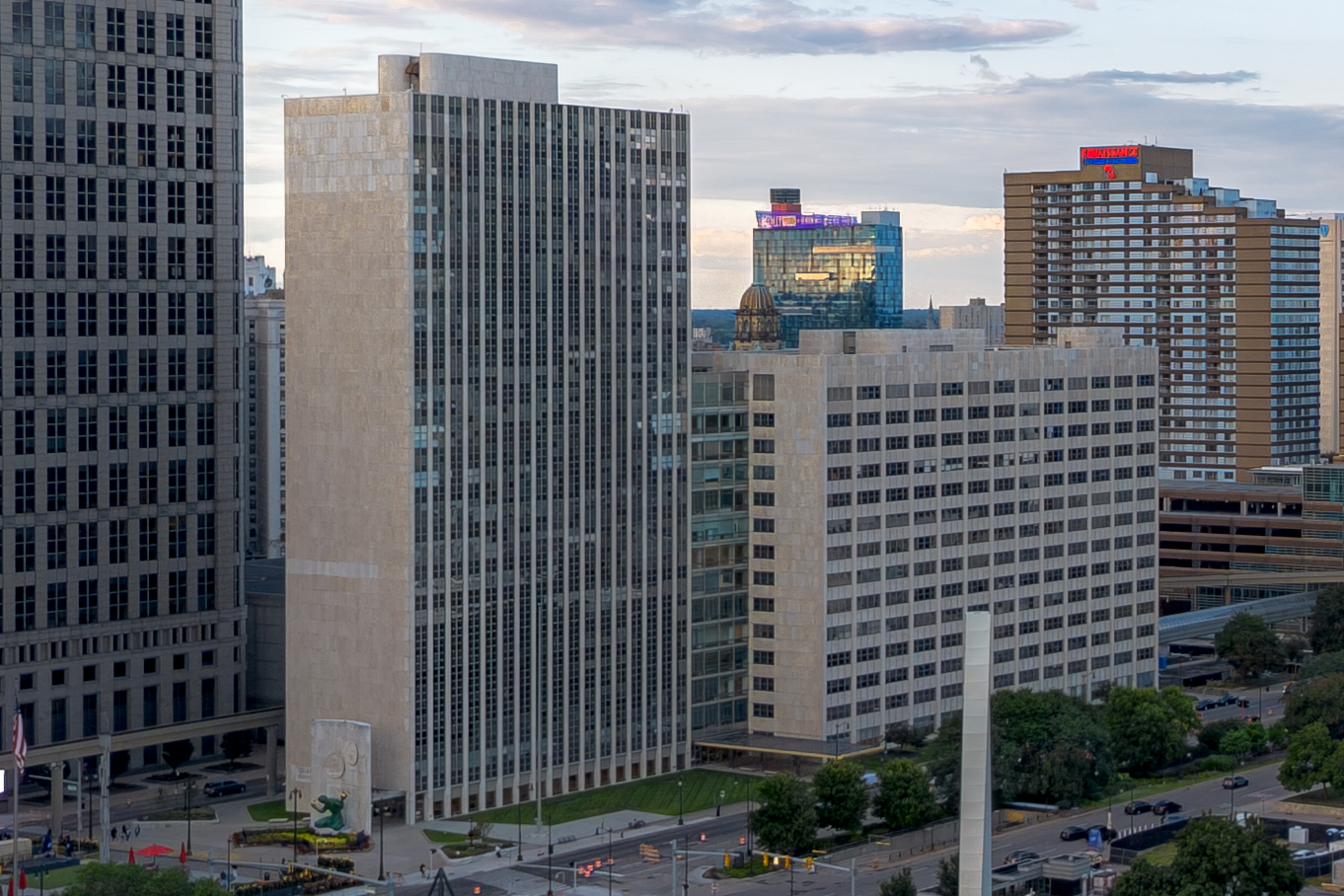
The Coleman A. Young Municipal Center houses the headquarters of the government of the City of Detroit, as well as offices of the Wayne County government.

The city is governed pursuant to the home rule Charter of the City of Detroit. The government is run by a mayor, the nine-member Detroit City Council, the eleven-member Board of Police Commissioners, and a clerk. All of these officers are elected on a nonpartisan ballot, with the exception of four of the police commissioners, who are appointed by the mayor. Detroit has a "strong mayoral" system, with the mayor approving departmental appointments. The council approves budgets, but the mayor is not obligated to adhere to any earmarking. The city clerk supervises elections and is formally charged with the maintenance of municipal records. City ordinances and substantially large contracts must be approved by the council. The Detroit City Code is the codification of Detroit's local ordinances.

Presently three Community Advisory Councils advise City Council representatives. Residents of each of Detroit's seven districts have the option of electing Community Advisory Councils. The city clerk supervises elections and is formally charged with the maintenance of municipal records. Municipal elections for mayor, city council and city clerk are held at four-year intervals, in the year after presidential elections. Following a November 2009 referendum, seven council members will be elected from districts beginning in 2013 while two will continue to be elected at-large.

Detroit's courts are state-administered and elections are nonpartisan. The Probate Court for Wayne County is in the Coleman A. Young Municipal Center in downtown. The Circuit Court is across Gratiot Avenue in the Frank Murphy Hall of Justice. The city is home to the Thirty-Sixth District Court, as well as the First District of the Michigan Court of Appeals and the United States District Court for the Eastern District of Michigan. The city provides law enforcement through the Detroit Police Department and emergency services through the Detroit Fire Department.

=== Politics ===
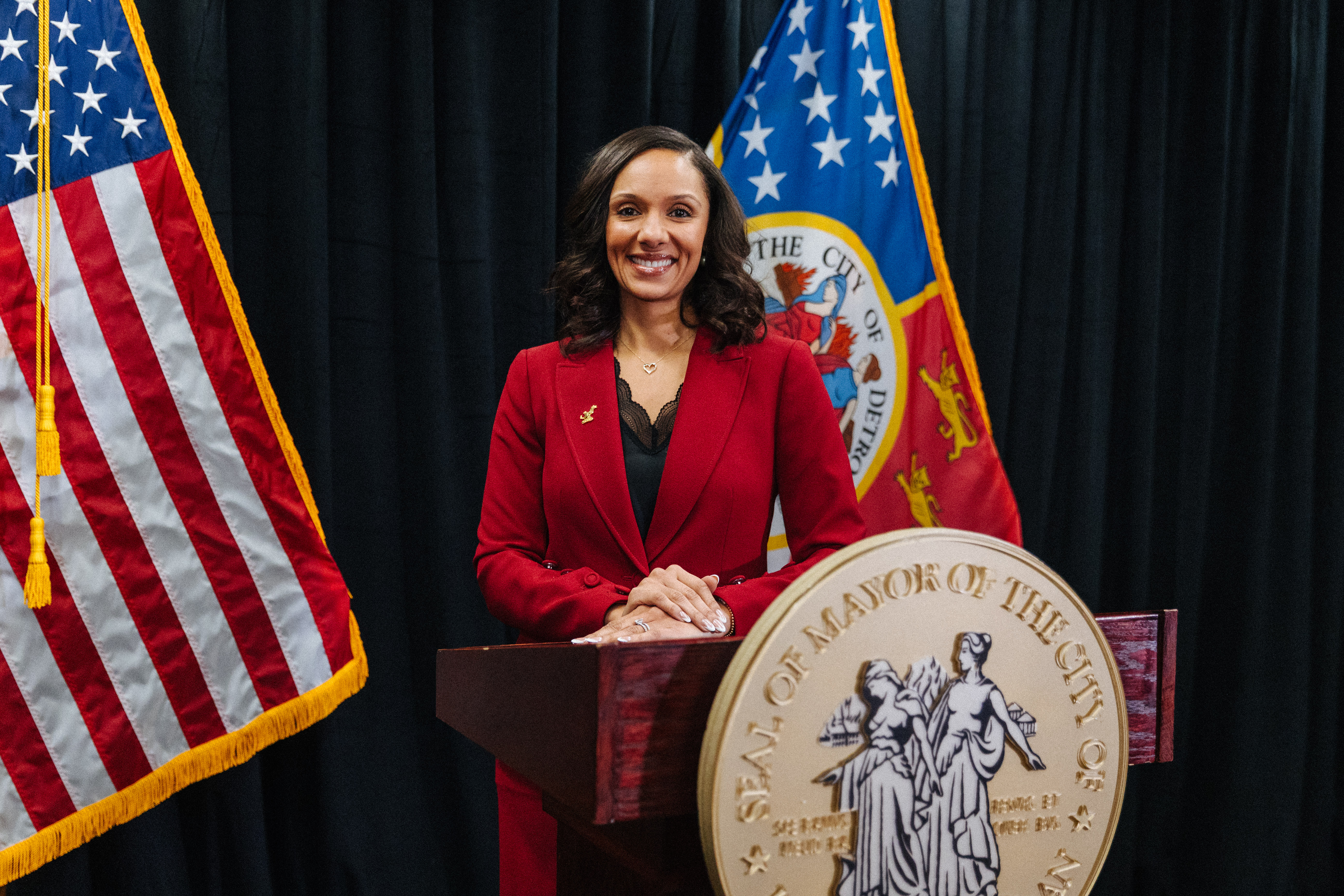
Mary Sheffield, the incumbent mayor of Detroit

Beginning with its incorporation in 1802, Detroit has had a total of 74 mayors. Detroit's last mayor from the Republican Party was Louis Miriani, who served from 1957 to 1962. In 1973, the city elected its first black mayor, Coleman Young. Despite development efforts, his combative style during his five terms in office was not well received by many suburban residents. Mayor Dennis Archer, a former Michigan Supreme Court Justice, refocused the city's attention on redevelopment with a plan to permit three casinos downtown. By 2008, three major casino resort hotels established operations in the city.

In 2000, the city requested an investigation by the United States Justice Department into the Detroit Police Department which was concluded in 2003 over allegations regarding its use of force and civil rights violations. The city proceeded with a major reorganization of the Detroit Police Department. In 2013, felony bribery charges were brought against seven building inspectors. In 2016, further corruption charges were brought against 12 principals, a former school superintendent and supply vendor for a $12 million (~$15.8 million in 2025) kickback scheme. However, law professor Peter Henning argues Detroit's corruption is not unusual for a city its size, especially when compared with Chicago. In 2025, the city elected its first woman as mayor, Mary Sheffield.

Detroit is sometimes referred to as a sanctuary city because it has "anti-profiling ordinances that generally prohibit local police from asking about the immigration status of people who are not suspected of any crime". The city in recent years has been a stronghold for the Democratic Party, with around 90% of votes in the city going to incumbent vice president, Kamala Harris, the Democratic candidate in the 2024 Presidential election.

== Education ==
=== Primary and secondary schools ===
As of 2016 many K-12 students in Detroit frequently change schools, with some children having been enrolled in seven schools before finishing their K-12 careers. There is a concentration of senior high schools and charter schools in the downtown area, which had wealthier residents and more gentrification relative to other parts of Detroit: Downtown, northwest Detroit, and northeast Detroit have 1,894, 3,742, and 6,018 students of high school age, respectively, while they have 11, three, and two high schools, respectively. As of 2016 because of the lack of public transportation and the lack of school bus services, many Detroit families have to rely on themselves to transport children to school.

With about 66,000 public school students (2011–12), the Detroit Public Schools (DPS) district is the largest school district in Michigan. Detroit has an additional 56,000 charter school students for a combined enrollment of about 122,000 students. As of 2009 there are about as many students in charter schools as there are in district schools. As of 2016 DPS continues to have the majority of the special education pupils. In addition, some Detroit students, as of 2016, attend public schools in other municipalities.

With growing charter schools enrollment as well as a continued exodus of population, the city planned to close many public schools. State officials report a 68% graduation rate for Detroit's public schools adjusted for those who change schools. Traditional public and charter school students in the city have performed poorly on standardized tests. c. 2009 and 2011, while Detroit traditional public schools scored a record low on national tests, the publicly funded charter schools did even worse than the traditional public schools. As of 2016 there were 30,000 excess openings in Detroit traditional public and charter schools, bearing in mind the number of K-12-aged children in the city. In 2016, Kate Zernike of The New York Times stated school performance did not improve despite the proliferation of charters, describing the situation as "lots of choice, with no good choice".

Detroit public schools students scored the lowest on tests of reading and writing of all major cities in the United States in 2015. Among eighth-graders, only 27% showed basic proficiency in math and 44% in reading. Nearly half of Detroit's adults are functionally illiterate.

Detroit is served by various private schools, as well as parochial Roman Catholic schools operated by the Archdiocese of Detroit. As of 2013 there are four Catholic grade schools and three Catholic high schools in the City of Detroit, with all of them in the city's west side. The Archdiocese of Detroit lists a number of primary and secondary schools in the metro area as Catholic education has emigrated to the suburbs. Of the three Catholic high schools, two are operated by the Society of Jesus and the third is co-sponsored by the Sisters, Servants of the Immaculate Heart of Mary and the Congregation of St. Basil.

=== Post-secondary education ===
Detroit is home to several institutions of higher learning, including Wayne State University and the University of Detroit Mercy. Grand Valley State University's Detroit Center hosts workshops, seminars, professional development, and other large gatherings. Sacred Heart Major Seminary, founded in 1919, is affiliated with Pontifical University of Saint Thomas Aquinas, Angelicum in Rome and offers pontifical degrees as well as civil undergraduate and graduate degrees. Other institutions in the city include the College for Creative Studies and Wayne County Community College. In June 2009, the Michigan State University College of Osteopathic Medicine which is based in East Lansing opened a satellite campus at the Detroit Medical Center.

Detroit has many vocational training institutes that provide technical training to prepare students for careers in the skilled trades.

== Media ==
The Detroit Free Press and The Detroit News are the major daily newspapers in the city. From 1989 until their agreement expired in December 2025, both broadsheet publications were managed by a joint venture called the Detroit Media Partnership, with the Free Press under the ownership of USA Today Co. (formerly Gannett) and the News under MediaNews Group. In March 2009, both newspapers reduced home delivery to three days per week, printed reduced newsstand issues on non-delivery days, and began focusing resources on Internet-based news delivery. In January 2026, USA Today acquired the News with plans to continue operating each newspaper separately.

The Metro Times, founded in 1980, is a weekly publication covering news, arts, and entertainment. Founded in 1935 and based in Detroit, the Michigan Chronicle is one of the oldest and most respected African-American weekly newspapers in America, covering politics, entertainment, sports, and community events. Media philanthropy includes the Detroit Free Press high school journalism program, the Old Newsboys' Goodfellow Fund of Detroit, and the Community Foundation for Southeast Michigan's Detroit Journalism Engagement Fund.

Detroit's television market is the 11th largest in the United States, according to estimates that do not include audiences in large areas of Ontario (including Windsor and Ottawa) who receive and watch Detroit television stations.

Detroit also has the 11th largest radio market in the United States, though this ranking also does not take into account Canadian audiences. Nearby Canadian stations such as Windsor's CKLW (whose jingles formerly proclaimed "CKLW - the Motor City") are popular in Detroit.

== Infrastructure ==
=== Health systems ===
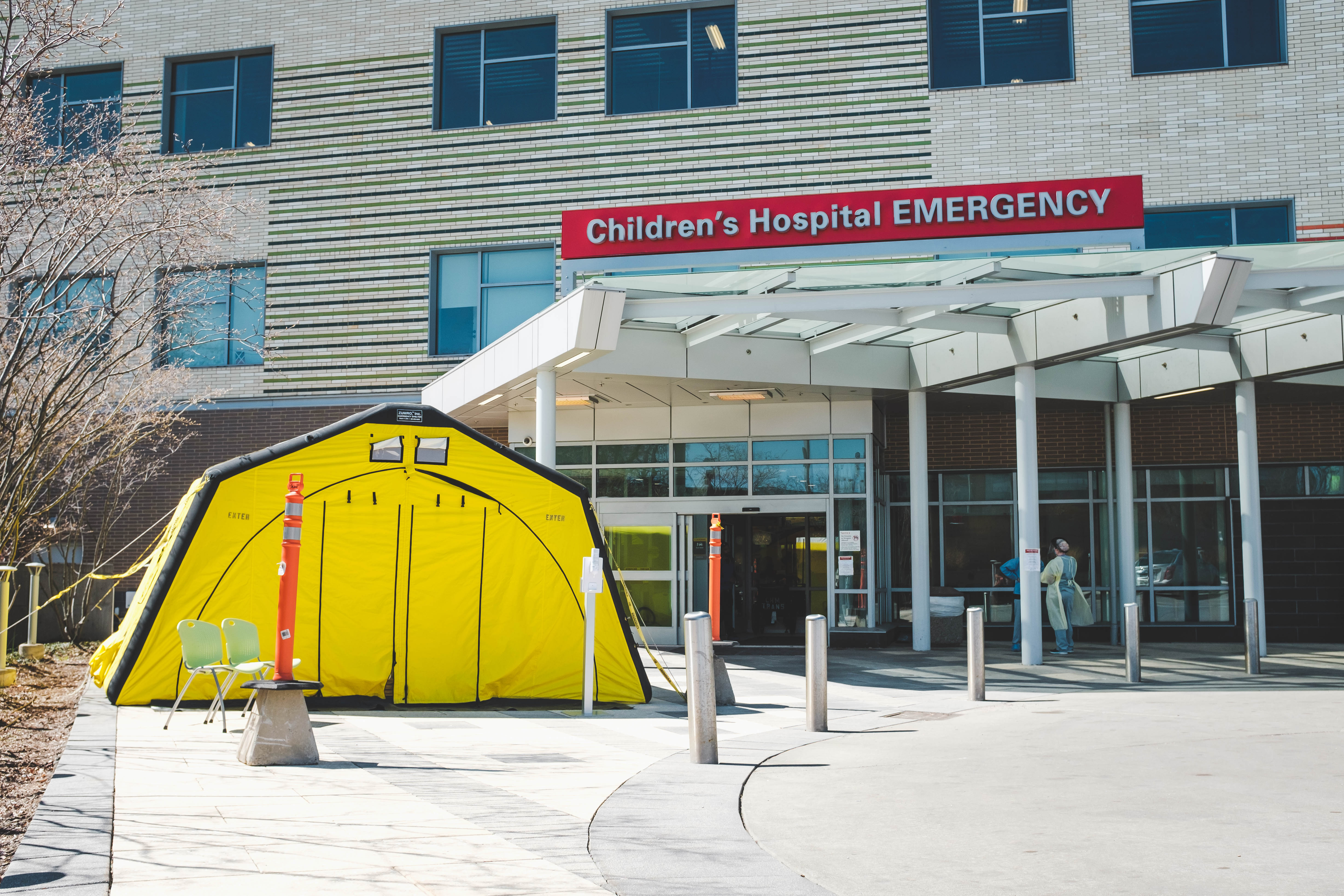
Children's Hospital of Michigan

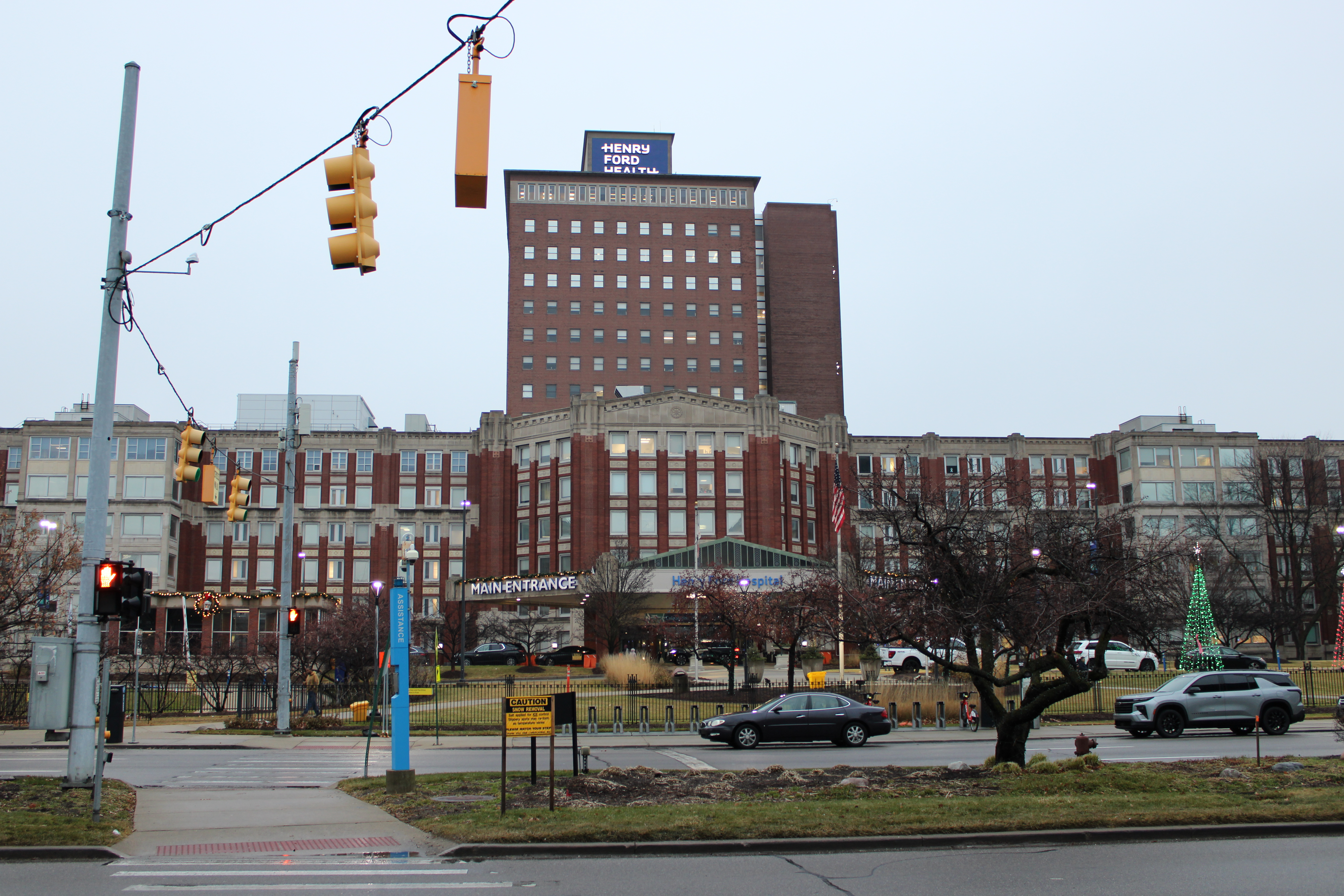
Henry Ford Hospital

There are over a dozen major hospitals, which include the Detroit Medical Center (DMC), Henry Ford Health System, St. John Health System, and the John D. Dingell VA Medical Center. DMC, a regional Level I trauma center, consists of Detroit Receiving Hospital and University Health Center, Children's Hospital of Michigan, Harper University Hospital, Hutzel Women's Hospital, Kresge Eye Institute, Rehabilitation Institute of Michigan, Sinai-Grace Hospital, and the Karmanos Cancer Institute. DMC has more than 2,000 licensed beds and 3,000 affiliated physicians. It is the largest private employer in the city. The center is staffed by physicians from the Wayne State University School of Medicine, the largest single-campus medical school in the United States and the fourth largest medical school overall.

DMC formally became a part of Vanguard Health Systems on December 30, 2010, as a for-profit corporation. Vanguard has agreed to invest nearly $1.5 B in the DMC complex. Vanguard has agreed to assume all debts and pension obligations.

In 2011, DMC and Henry Ford Health System substantially increased investments in medical research facilities and hospitals in the city's Midtown and New Center. In 2012, two major construction projects were begun in New Center. The Henry Ford Health System started the first phase of a $500 million, 300-acre revitalization project, with the construction of a new $30 million, 275,000-square-foot, Medical Distribution Center for Cardinal Health, Inc. and Wayne State University started construction on a new $93 million, 207,000-square-foot, Integrative Biosciences Center (IBio). As many as 500 researchers and staff will work out of the IBio Center.

=== Transportation ===
With its proximity to Canada and its facilities, ports, major highways, rail connections and international airports, Detroit is an important transportation hub.

==== Border crossings ====
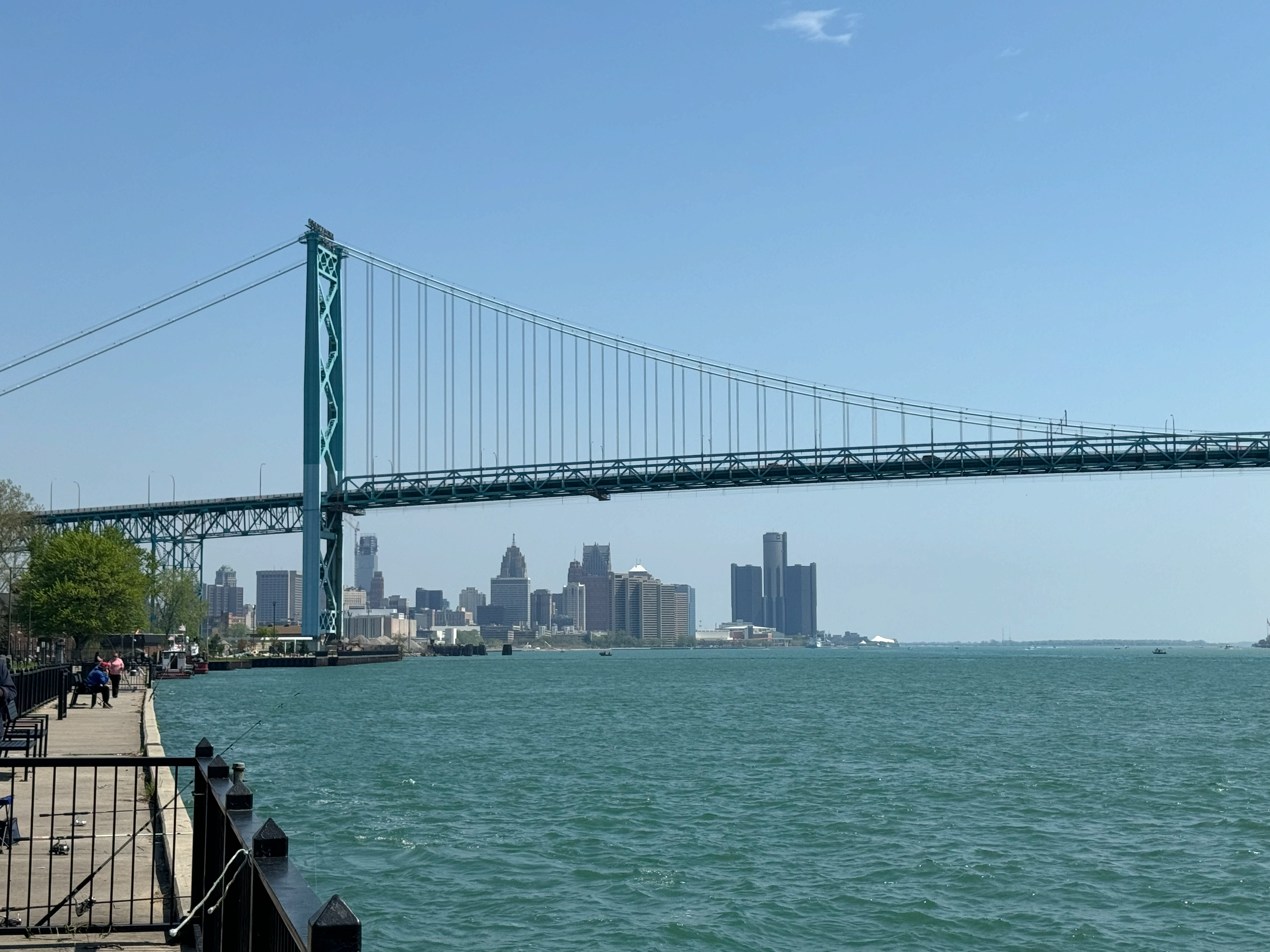
Ambassador Bridge

Detroit has four border crossings: the Gordie Howe International Bridge which opened in 2026, the Ambassador Bridge and the Detroit–Windsor tunnel provide motor vehicle thoroughfares, with the Michigan Central Railway Tunnel providing railroad access to and from Canada. Until 2023, the Detroit–Windsor Truck Ferry serviced the border crossing near the Windsor Salt Mine and Zug Island.

In 2015 Canadian Transport Minister Lisa Raitt announced Canada agreed to pay the entire cost to build a $250 million U.S. Customs plaza adjacent to the planned new Detroit–Windsor bridge, now the Gordie Howe International Bridge. Canada had already planned to pay for 95% of the bridge, which will cost $2.1 billion and is expected to open in early 2026. "This allows Canada and Michigan to move the project forward immediately to its next steps which include further design work and property acquisition on the U.S. side of the border", Raitt said issued after she spoke in the House of Commons.

==== Transit systems ====
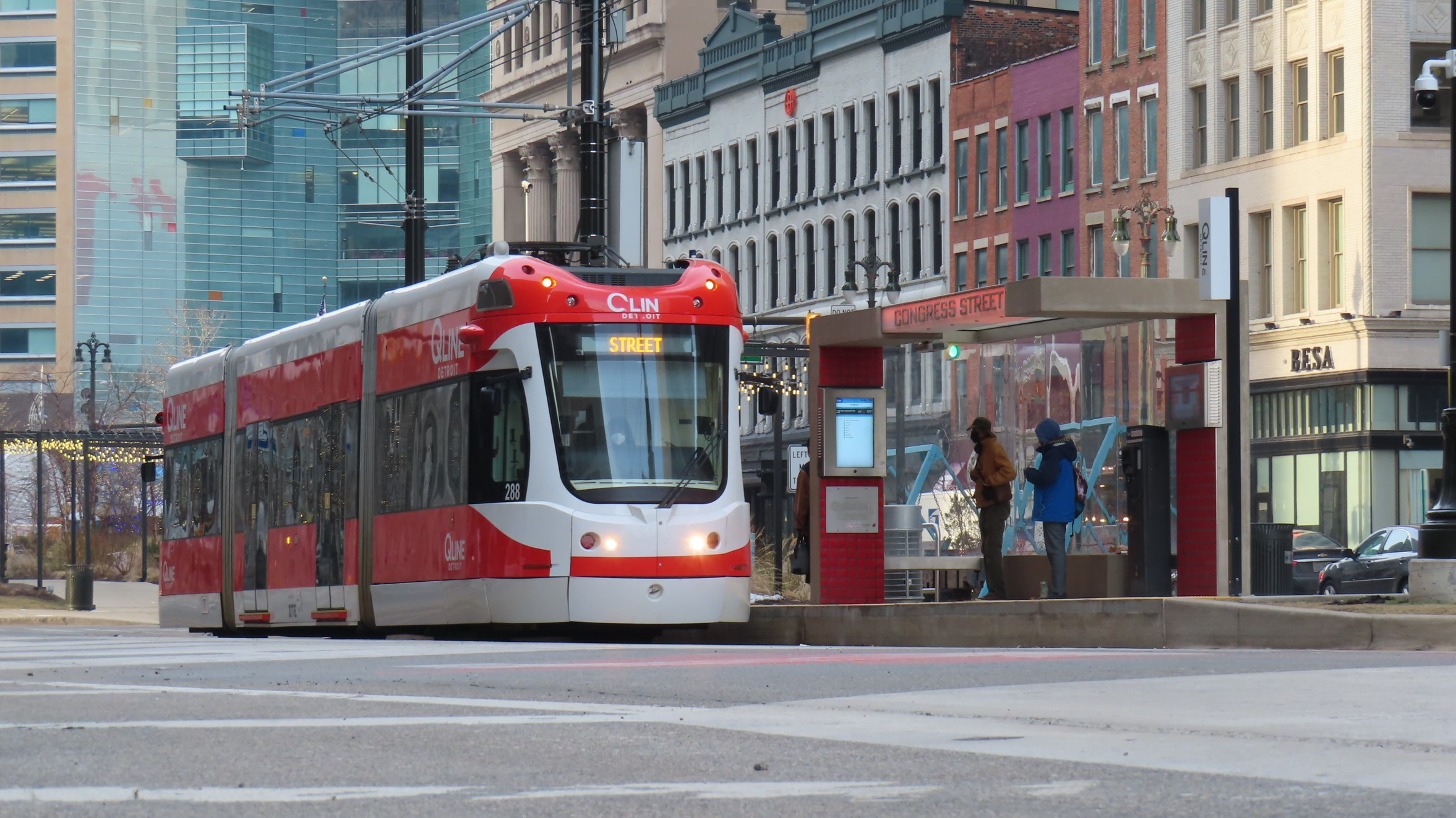
A QLINE streetcar arriving at the Congress Street station

Mass transit in the region is provided by bus services. The Detroit Department of Transportation provides service within city limits up to the outer edges of the city. From there, the Suburban Mobility Authority for Regional Transportation (SMART) provides service to the suburbs and the city regionally with local routes and SMART's FAST service. FAST is a new service provided by SMART which offers limited stops along major corridors throughout the Detroit metropolitan area connecting the suburbs to downtown. The new high-frequency service travels along three of Detroit's busiest corridors, Gratiot, Woodward, and Michigan, and only stops at designated FAST stops. Cross border service between the downtown areas of Windsor and Detroit is provided by Transit Windsor via the Tunnel Bus. Intercity bus service is offered at the Detroit Bus Station. Greyhound Lines, Flixbus, Indian Trails, and Barons Bus Lines connect Detroit with numerous cities across the Midwest.

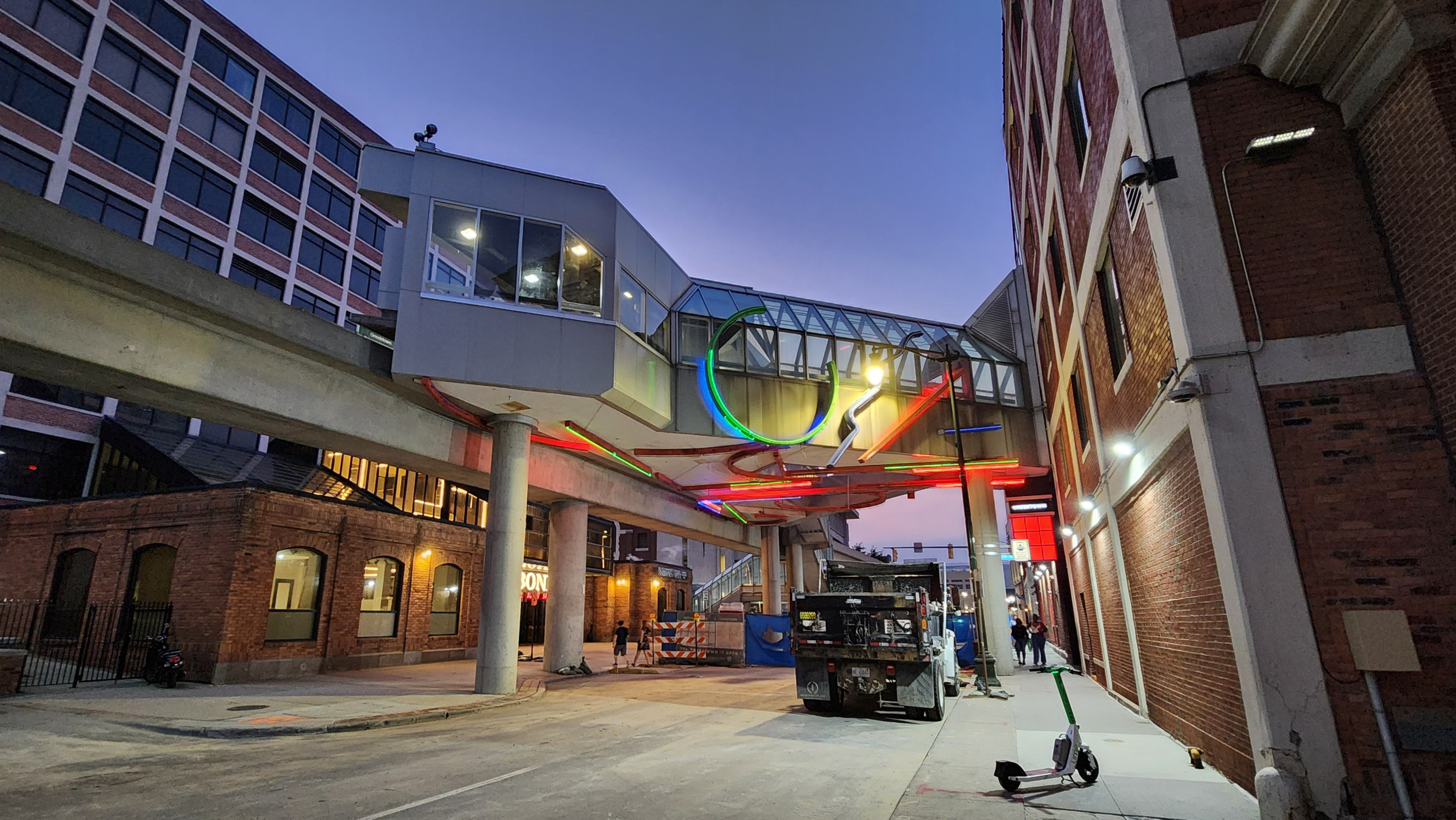
The Greektown station on the Detroit People Mover (DPM) elevated railway

An elevated rail system known as the People Mover, completed in 1987, provides daily service around a 2.94-mile (4.73 km) loop downtown. The QLine serves as a link between the People Mover and the Amtrak station via Woodward Avenue.

The Regional Transit Authority (RTA) was established by an act of the Michigan legislature in 2012 to oversee and coordinate all existing regional mass transit operations, and to develop new transit services in the region. The RTA's first project was the introduction of RelfeX, a limited-stop, cross-county bus service connecting downtown and midtown Detroit with Oakland county via Woodward avenue.

==== Passenger and freight rail ====
Amtrak provides service to Detroit, operating its Wolverine service between Chicago and Pontiac. The Amtrak station is in New Center north of downtown.

Freight railroad operations in the city of Detroit are provided by Canadian National Railway, Canadian Pacific Railway, Conrail Shared Assets, CSX Transportation and Norfolk Southern Railway, each of which have local yards within the city. Detroit is also served by the Delray Connecting Railroad and Detroit Connecting Railroad shortlines.

==== Airports ====
Detroit Metropolitan Wayne County Airport (DTW), the principal airport serving Detroit, is in nearby Romulus. DTW is a primary hub for Delta Air Lines (following its acquisition of Northwest Airlines). The airport is connected to Downtown Detroit by the Suburban Mobility Authority for Regional Transportation (SMART) FAST Michigan route.

Coleman A. Young International Airport (DET), previously called Detroit City Airport, is on Detroit's northeast side; the airport now maintains only charter service and general aviation. Willow Run Airport, in western Wayne County near Ypsilanti, is a general aviation and cargo airport.

==== Roads and freeways ====
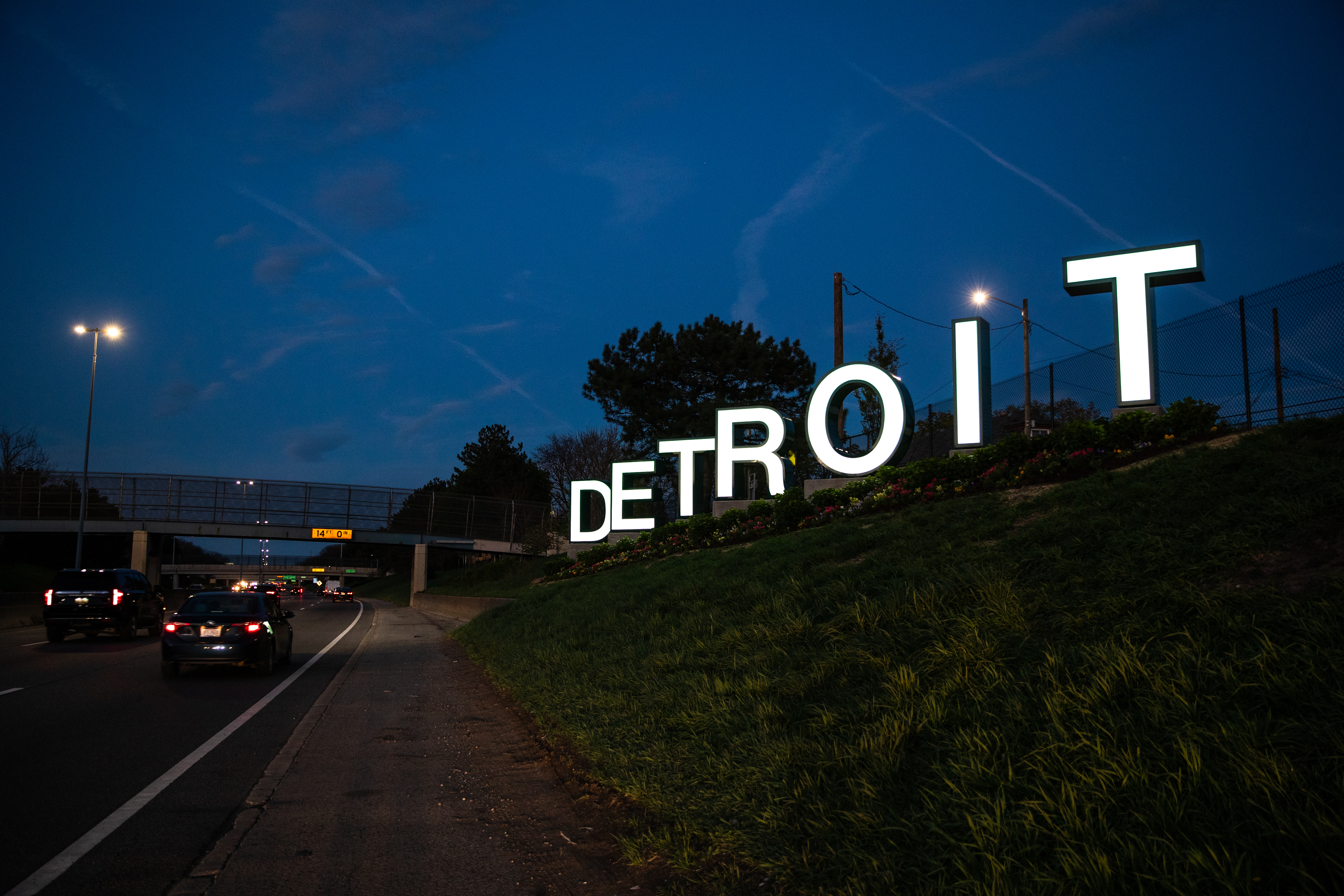
I-94 runs east–west through Detroit. Pictured is the Detroit Sign, located along eastbound I-94 on the city's southwest side.

Three road systems cross the city: the original French template, with avenues radiating from the waterfront, and true north–south roads based on the Northwest Ordinance township system. The city is north of Windsor, Ontario. Detroit is the only major city along the Canada–U.S. border in which one travels south to cross into Canada.

Metro Detroit has an extensive toll-free network of freeways administered by the Michigan Department of Transportation. Four major Interstate Highways surround the city. Detroit is connected via I-75 and I-96 to Kings Highway 401 and to major Southern Ontario cities such as London, Ontario and the Greater Toronto Area. I-75 (Chrysler and Fisher freeways) is the region's main north–south route, serving Flint, Pontiac, Troy, and Detroit, before continuing south (as the Detroit–Toledo and Seaway Freeways) to serve many of the communities along the shore of Lake Erie.

I-94 (Edsel Ford Freeway) runs east–west through Detroit and serves Ann Arbor to the west (where it continues to Chicago) and Port Huron to the northeast. The stretch of the I-94 freeway from Ypsilanti to Detroit was one of America's earlier limited-access highways. Henry Ford built it to link the factories at Willow Run and Dearborn during World War II. A portion was known as the Willow Run Expressway. The I-96 freeway runs northwest–southeast through Livingston, Oakland and Wayne counties and (as the Jeffries Freeway through Wayne County) has its eastern terminus in downtown Detroit.

I-275 runs north–south from I-75 in the south to the junction of I-96 and I-696 in the north, providing a bypass through the western suburbs of Detroit. I-375 is a short spur route in downtown Detroit, an extension of the Chrysler Freeway. I-696 (Reuther Freeway) runs east–west from the junction of I-96 and I-275, providing a route through the northern suburbs of Detroit. Taken together, I-275 and I-696 form a semicircle around Detroit. Michigan state highways designated with the letter M serve to connect major freeways.

=== Postal service ===
==== Floating post office ====
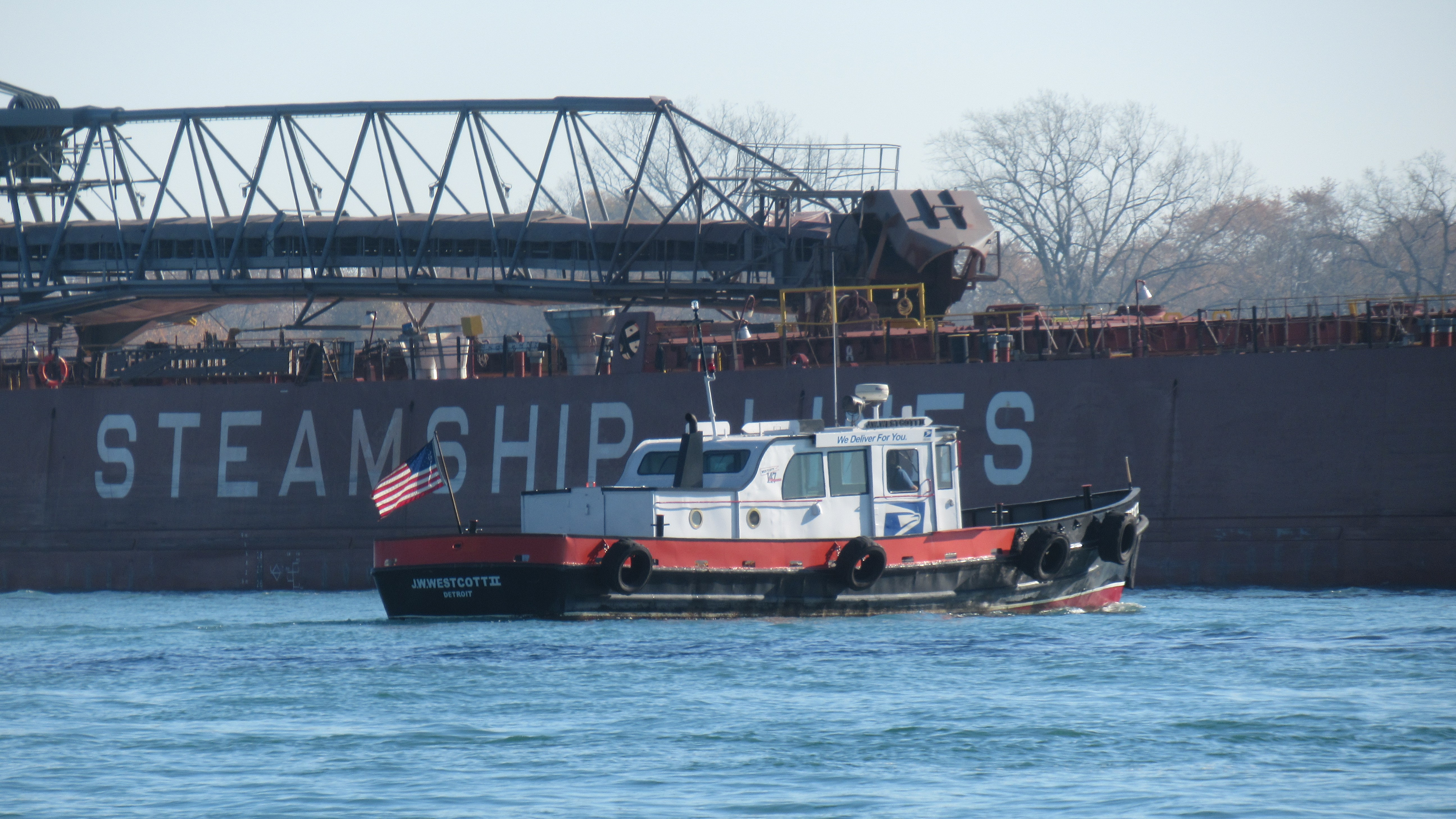
J.W. Westcott II on the Detroit River

Detroit has a floating post office, the J. W. Westcott II, which serves lake freighters along the Detroit River. Its ZIP Code is 48222. The ZIP Code is used exclusively for the J. W. Westcott II, which makes it the only floating ZIP Code in the United States. It has a land-based office at 12 24th Street, just south of the Ambassador Bridge. The J.W. Westcott Company was established in 1874 by Captain John Ward Westcott as a maritime reporting agency to inform other vessels about port conditions, and the J. W. Westcott II vessel began service in 1949 and is still in operation today.

== Sister cities ==
Detroit's sister cities include the following:

- Chongqing, China
- Dubai, United Arab Emirates
- Huế, Vietnam
- Kitwe, Zambia
- Minsk, Belarus
- (The Bahamas) Nassau, Bahamas
- Toyota, Japan
- Turin, Italy

== See also ==
- USS Detroit, at least 6 ships
