= Wayne State University School of Medicine =

Medical school in Detroit, Michigan, US

Coordinates: 42°21′16.1″N 83°03′20.7″W

- Type: Public medical school
- Established: 1868
- Parent institution: Wayne State University
- Dean: Wael Sakr
- Students: 1,500
- Location: Detroit, Michigan, U.S.
- Website: www.med.wayne.edu

The Wayne State University School of Medicine (WSUSOM) is the medical school of Wayne State University, a public research university in Detroit, Michigan. It enrolls more than 1,500 students in undergraduate medical education, master's degree, Ph.D., and M.D.-Ph.D. WSUSOM traces its roots through four predecessor institutions since its founding in 1868.

== History ==
The Detroit Medical College was founded in 1868 in a building on Woodward Avenue. The Michigan College of Medicine was incorporated in 1879 and offered classes in the former Hotel Hesse at the intersection of Gratiot Avenue, Madison Avenue and St Antoine Street. In 1885, the two schools merged to form the Detroit College of Medicine and occupied the former Michigan College of Medicine building. The college was reorganized and refinanced as the Detroit College of Medicine and Surgery in 1913, and five-years later, came under control of the Detroit Board of Education. In 1933, the Board of Education joined the Detroit College of Medicine and Surgery with the colleges of Liberal Arts, Education, Engineering, Pharmacy, and the Graduate School to form an institution of higher education called the Colleges of the City of Detroit. This was renamed Wayne University in 1934 and became a state-chartered institution, Wayne State University, in 1956.

Scott Hall is the main building that centers the medical education at WSU-SOM

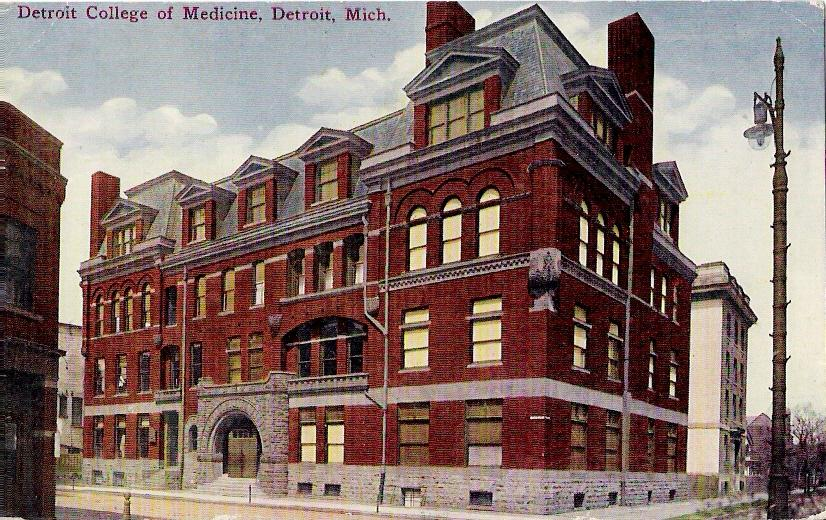
Detroit College of Medicine, about 1911

Professors at the school provided the "first evidence that glucose is a major stimulant on insulin secretion and, while an increase in the concentration of blood glucose stimulates the secretion of insulin, a decrease inhibits it and, in addition, stimulates the secretion of a blood-sugar raising factor (glucagon) by the pancreas." Subsequent experiments contributed substantially to the establishment of glucagon as a "second pancreatic hormone."

The first successful open heart surgery was performed at the Detroit Medical Center by Wayne State University physician Forest Dodrill on patient Henry Opitek. He used a machine developed by himself and researchers at General Motors, the Dodrill-GMR, considered to be the first operational mechanical heart used while performing open heart surgery.

Wayne State University School of Medicine is the academic affiliate of the Barbara Ann Karmanos Cancer Institute, one of 26 NCI-designated Cancer Centers in the United States. WSUSOM researchers, in conjunction with Karmanos Cancer Institute, oversee more than 400 clinical trials, participate in a national program to collect and study cancer data for future research and provide about half of all national statistics on cancer in African Americans. The first drug approved for the treatment of AIDS and HIV infection, Zidovudine was synthesized here. WSUSOM and Karmanos furthered their partnership in 2009, signing an agreement to establish a new academic department at the school for Karmanos researchers and expand their already successful research and teaching partnership.

== Community care ==
The school has strong ties to the local community. Wayne State University has a stated mission to improve the overall health of the community. As part of this mission, the School of Medicine has established with the help of a $6 million NIH grant the Center for Urban and African American Health to seek new ways to redress health disparities by identifying preventive strategies and therapeutic approaches to chronic diseases that plague this population, namely obesity, cardiovascular disease and cancer. More than 500 students annually serve at more than 70 clinical sites and nearly 100 community-based mentoring and outreach locations, and participate in a growing number of public health policy and advocacy opportunities. Year 1 and 2 students volunteer more than 34,000 hours of community service annually.

== Academics ==
Wayne State University School of Medicine offers many graduate programs including an MD/PhD program, ten Doctor of Philosophy programs, eight Master of Science programs, and four certification programs. It also offers a postbaccalaureate program for pre-medical students that meet its 6 eligibility criteria.

=== Rankings ===
Wayne State University School of Medicine is ranked 66 out of 188 in the 2022 edition of the U.S. News & World Report research rankings.

== Affiliations ==
Wayne State University School of Medicine, along with Michigan State University's College of Osteopathic Medicine, is affiliated for undergraduate and graduate medical education with the hospitals of the Detroit Medical Center and Henry Ford Health System. The Detroit Medical Center includes the Children's Hospital of Michigan, the Rehabilitation Institute of Michigan, Detroit Receiving Hospital, Harper University Hospital, Hutzel Women's Hospital, Sinai-Grace Hospital, Huron Valley-Sinai Hospital, and the DMC Surgery Hospital. Primary affiliates within the HFHS are Henry Ford Hospital, Henry Ford West Bloomfield Hospital, and Henry Ford Kingswood Hospital, a comprehensive psychiatric facility. Detroit Receiving Hospital and Henry Ford Hospital are Level 1 Trauma Centers, Children's Hospital of Michigan is a Pediatric Level 1 Trauma Center. Additionally, it coordinates teaching experiences for students and residents with 14 community hospitals through the Southeast Michigan Center for Medical Education.

== Notable alumni ==
- Rana Awdish, M.D., pulmonary and critical care physician and author.
- Lawrence "Larry" Brilliant, Physician, epidemiologist, technologist, author, and philanthropist. The former director of Google's philanthropic arm Google.org
- Phyllis Harrison-Ross, psychiatrist working with developmentally disabled and mentally ill children
- Ron Krome, first editor-in-chief Annals of Emergency Medicine and former president of American College of Emergency Physicians
- Christopher W. Lentz, U.S. Air Force Brigadier General
- Jerry Michael Linenger, M.D., retired Captain in the United States Navy Medical Corps and a former NASA astronaut who flew on the Space Shuttle and Space Station Mir.
- Joe Schwarz, former U.S. Representative for Michigan's 7th congressional district.

== Notable faculty ==
- Flossie Cohen, former professor, pediatric immunologist
- Margo Cohen, former professor and head of Endocrinology and Metabolism; later the founder of Exocell
- Morris Goodman, PhD, member of the National Academy of Science
- David Gorski, associate professor of surgery, blogger on alternative medicine and pseudoscience
- Jerome Horwitz, scientist and researcher who developed AZT, the first anti-retroviral effective on HIV
- Bhanu Pratap Jena, cell biologist & discoverer of Porosomes
- John S. Meyer, M.D., founding professor and Chairman of Neurology in 1957
- Werner Spitz, former Chief Medical Examiner of Wayne County, Michigan
- Gabriel Steiner, former professor of neurology and neuropathology, known for his research of multiple sclerosis.
- Joel L. Young, Assistant Clinical Professor of Psychology and author
