= Rana Awdish =

American pulmonologist, author

- Born: Michigan, United States
- Education: Wayne State University School of Medicine
- Known for: Studies on lung diseases
- Awards: 2017 Press Ganey Physician of the Year; 2017 Schwartz Center’s National Compassionate Caregiver of the Year Award
- Scientific career
- Fields: Pulmonology
- Workplaces: Henry Ford Hospital; Wayne State University School of Medicine

Rana Awdish is an American critical care physician, pulmonologist, author and medical director of the Pulmonary Hypertension Program of Henry Ford Hospital. She is best known for her critically acclaimed, bestselling book In Shock: My Journey from Death to Recovery and the Redemptive Power of Hope.

== Biography ==
Awdish was born in Michigan. She completed her undergraduate degree at the University of Michigan in Ann Arbor. Awdish received a Doctor of Medicine degree (MD) from the Wayne State University Medical School in 2002 where she was inducted into the Alpha Omega Alpha honor society, after which she moved to the New York to complete her training at Mount Sinai Beth Israel in Manhattan. Subsequently, she joined the Pulmonary and Critical Care Physician at the Henry Ford Hospital, Detroit.

After suffering from a sudden critical illness in 2008, Awdish began advocating for connected care for patient experience and physicians to prevent burnout and moral distress. She is a sought-after public speaker, delivering keynote addresses to groups ranging from professional medical societies, to members of Congress, to organizations combatting homelessness. She lectures to physicians, hospital leadership and medical schools around the country. In 2012, she started a communication program CLEAR conversation in the Henry Ford Hospital, training the medical residents, fellows and faculty in communication skills for improving conversations. Her book, In Shock: My Journey from Death to Recovery and the Redemptive Power of Hope, is an LA Times Bestseller and has been featured in the Washington Post, NPR, The Today Show, The Times Literary Supplement. The book has been translated into multiple other languages.

In 2020, the podcast This American Life documented the COVID pandemic in Detroit in an episode entitled "The Reprieve", using Awdish's audio diary of Henry Ford Hospital employees' experience during that time. Her narrative non-fiction essays have been published in The Examined Life Journal, Intima, CHEST and The New England Journal of Medicine. She has written editorials for The Harvard Business Review, Annals of Internal Medicine, The Washington Post and The Detroit Free Press. Her essay "The Shape of the Shore" was awarded a Sydney by the New York Times and was nominated for a Pushcart Prize.

Her highly anticipated second book, After Shock, was released in June of 2026 by Macmillan to critical acclaim.

== Awards and honors ==
- Critical Care Teacher of the Year 2016 Henry Ford Health System
- Press Ganey Physician of the Year 2017
- Schwartz Center's National Compassionate Caregiver of the Year Award in 2017
- 2019 The Ake Grenvik Honorary Award from the Society for Critical Care Medicine.
- 2020 Healthcare Hero by U.S. News & World Report
- 2020 Sydney Award by David Brooks of The New York Times
- 2021 Nominated for American Literary Award, Pushcart Prize
- 2025 Distinguished Alumni Award, Wayne State University School of Medicine.
- 2025 Master American College of Physicians.

== Bibliography ==
- Awdish, R, Berry L, et al (2025). The Value - and Values - of Listening. Mayo Clinic Proceedings.
- Awdish, R, Berry L, et al (2024). Never Words: What NOT to say to Patients with Serious Illness Mayo Clinic Proceedings.
- Awdish, R (2023). A Kind of Faith. CHEST.
- Awdish, R (2022). Restoration in the Aftermath. ATS Scholar.
- Awdish, R (2021). You Don't Ever Let Go of the Thread. Annals of Internal Medicine.
- Awdish, R (2021). The Subway. CHEST.
- Awdish, R, Berry L, et al (2021). Trust-Based Partnerships are Essential - and Achievable - in Healthcare Service. Mayo Clinic Proceedings.
- Awdish, R (2020). The Aviary. The Examined Life Journal
- Awdish, R (2020). The Shape of the Shore. Intima Journal of Narrative Medicine.
- Awdish, R, Berry, L (2020). "Health Care Organizations Should Be as Generous as Their Workers". Annals of Internal Medicine.
- Awdish, R, (2020). "I'm a doctor. My patients deserve your compassion". Detroit Free Press.
- Awdish, R, Ely, W (2020) "Let families visit coronavirus patients". The Washington Post.
- Awdish, R (2020). "The Liminal Space". New England Journal of Medicine.
- Awdish, R, Berry, L (2019). "Putting Healing Back at the Center of Health Care". Harvard Business Review.
- Awdish, R, et al. (2019). "Finding Hope and Healing when Cure is not Possible". Mayo Clinic Proceedings.
- Awdish, Rana (2018). In Shock: How Nearly Dying Made Me a Better Intensive Care Doctor. Penguin Random House. ISBN 9780593079492.
- Awdish, R, Berry, L (2017). "Making time to really listen to your patients". Harvard Business Review.
- Awdish, R, (2017). "A View from the Edge: Creating a Culture of Caring". New England Journal of Medicine.
- Awdish, R, et al. (2017). "The Role of Kindness in Cancer Care". Journal of Oncology Practice.
