= Berridge Hotel =

- U.S. National Register of Historic Places
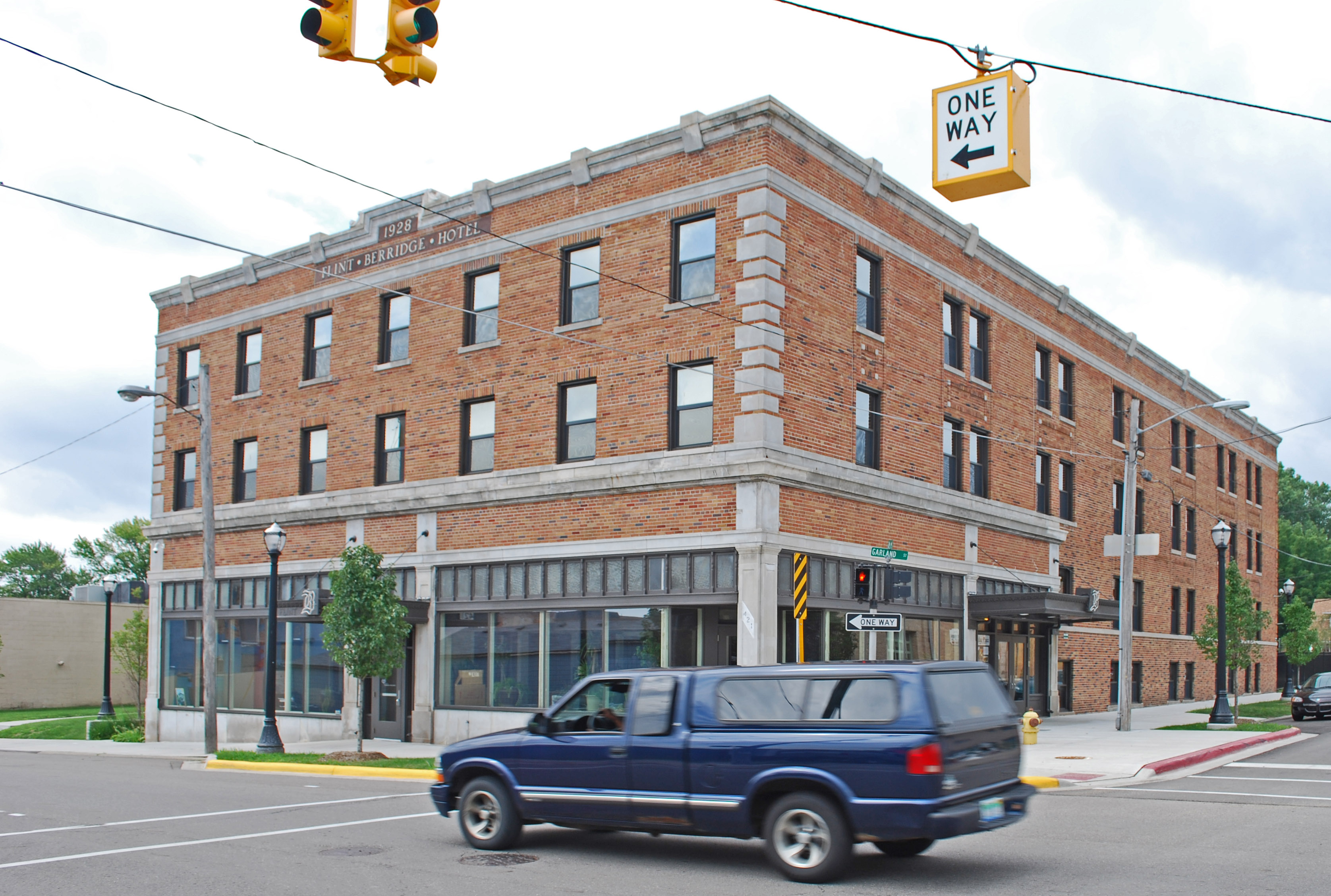
- Interactive map
- Location: 421 Garland St., Flint, Michigan
- Coordinates: 43°01′10″N 83°41′44″W
- Area: 0.1 acres (0.040 ha)
- Built: 1926
- Built by: John A. Pearl
- Architectural style: Classical Revival
- NRHP reference No.: 08000219
- Added to NRHP: March 27, 2008

The Berridge Hotel, also known as Berridge Place, is a former hotel located at 421 Garland Street in Flint, Michigan. It has been renovated into apartments. The building was listed on the National Register of Historic Places in 2008.

== History ==
John C. Berridge was born in Flint in 1879 to Walter Berridge, who owned a local store dealing in groceries, drugs, and meats. John attended the Detroit College of Medicine, graduating in 1900, and went on to become a pharmacist. He returned to Flint in 1908 and became a partner in the Flint Drug Company, eventually becoming sole owner of the company.

Flint at the beginning of the twentieth century was experiencing explosive growth tied to the growth of the automotive industry. The city's population increased from under 40,000 in 1910 to over 150,000 in 1930. This increase in population severely crimped the housing supply in the area, particularly for auto workers newly arrived in town. Berridge first entered the real estate market in 1919, when he purchased and moved into the Tinlinn Apartments, an upscale apartment building on Garland Street. In 1926, he hired contractor John A. Pearl of Detroit to construct a large hotel/apartment building on the lot next door to the Tinlinn.

The Berridge Hotel opened in 1928 as a lower-end residence hotel, offering reasonable weekly rates; it was likely marketed toward newcomers to town. Berridge operated the hotel until 1938, when Citizens Bank foreclosed on both it and the Tinlinn. C.J. Buehlmann, manager of Flint's Capital Hotel, purchased the hotel and ran it until his death in 1957, after which it was run by his wife and daughter. After the Buehlmanns, a series of reality companies operated the hotel until 1980, when Mr. and Mrs. Walter Drawl purchased the hotel. The Drawls ran it until 2006, with long haul truck drivers forming much of their clientele.

The hotel was purchased by the Genesee County Land Bank in 2006. After a $6 million renovation that converted it into 17 loft apartments, the building reopened as the Berridge Place in 2008.

== Description ==
The Berridge Hotel is a 3-1/2-story, flat-roof, red-orange brick hotel building, built in a U shape. The main facade is seven bays wide, with a single central entrance framed with limestone pilasters. The center entrance is flanked by two storefronts, each one story high and three bays wide, with limestone piers at the corners. A brick signband with a limestone cornice separates the first floor from the upper floors. The upper floors have window openings with limestone sills, and limestone quoining on the corners of the building. An architrave band, brick frieze, and projecting cornice runs along the top. In the center is a metal plaque with "1928" on it, and a metal sign just below reading "Flint Berridge Hotel."
