= Dowden Health Media =

- Industry: Medical publishing
- Founded: 1988; 38 years ago
- Founders: Carroll and Mark Dowden
- Defunct: 2005
- Fate: Acquired by Lebhar-Friedman
- Successor: Wainscot Media
- Headquarters: Montvale, New Jersey, United States
- Products: Mayo Clinic Proceedings

Dowden Health Media is an American publisher of websites and peer-reviewed journals in the field of medicine. Since 1997 Dowden Health Media has partnered with the Mayo Clinic to publish the Mayo Clinic Proceedings. The company was founded in 1988 In 2005, Dowden Health Media was acquired by Lebhar-Friedman, a trade magazine publishing company.
