= Interval walking training =

Aerobic exercise method

Interval walking training (IWT), also known as Japanese walking or Nihon Aruki, is a structured aerobic exercise method that alternates between slow and fast walking in set intervals for a minimum of 30 minutes per session. The method was developed by exercise physiologists Hiroshi Nose and Shizue Masuki at Shinshu University Graduate School of Medicine in Matsumoto, Nagano, Japan, and first described in scientific literature in 2007. Unlike regular steady-paced walking, IWT applies the principles of high-intensity interval training (HIIT), making it accessible to a wide range of ages and fitness levels without specialized equipment or a gym environment.

== History ==
The concept of IWT emerged from research conducted at Shinshu University in Matsumoto, Japan, during the early 2000s. Professor Hiroshi Nose and Associate Professor Shizue Masuki, both of the Graduate School of Medicine's Department of Sports Medical Sciences, aimed to develop an exercise program that would improve cardiovascular and metabolic health in middle-aged and older adults. The researchers based their approach on interval training used by competitive endurance athletes, adapting that structure to the low-impact format of walking so that it could be performed freely in everyday environments without constant professional supervision.

The foundational clinical study was published in 2007 in Mayo Clinic Proceedings. The method was subsequently introduced to the public in Japan as part of a health promotion program called the Jukunen Taiikydaigaku Program, aimed at improving fitness in adults over 40 without the physical strain of high-impact workouts.

IWT is sometimes mistaken for the 10,000 steps per day method, which originated in Japan during the 1960s as a commercial pedometer marketing campaign. Nose and Masuki have explicitly distinguished IWT from that goal, emphasizing that their method is defined by exercise intensity rather than total step volume. From the mid-2010s, IWT received broader international attention, with researchers in Denmark adapting the protocol for clinical use in type 2 diabetes and developing a smartphone application called InterWalk to deliver the training at scale without requiring a personal trainer. By the mid-2020s, IWT had attracted widespread public attention through social media, where it circulated under the name "Japanese walking" and was discussed as a well-evidenced, accessible alternative to more demanding forms of high-intensity exercise.

== Method ==
The IWT protocol consists of repeated 3-minute intervals alternating between high- and low-intensity walking. During the high-intensity phase, participants walk at a pace above 70% of their individual peak aerobic capacity, then drop to the low-intensity phase at around 40% for the following 3 minutes. They repeat this cycle at least five times, giving a total session of 30 minutes or more, and aim to do this four or more times per week.

A characteristic of IWT is the individualization of its intensity targets. Rather than prescribing a fixed walking speed or heart rate, the protocol establishes fast and slow phases tailored to each participant's aerobic capacity. This means that two individuals with different fitness levels can follow the same protocol at very different speeds, yet both work at the appropriate intensity for their bodies. In practical terms, the fast phase should feel challenging enough to make sustained effort difficult, while the slow phase allows partial recovery without reaching complete rest.

To support this individualized approach outside laboratory conditions, Nose and Masuki's research group developed a triaxial accelerometer device called the JD Mate, capable of estimating energy expenditure in real time and providing feedback on whether participants were meeting their prescribed intensity thresholds. As the program expanded internationally, a smartphone application was developed to replicate this monitoring function, substantially reducing the technical and logistical barriers to participation.

IWT requires no specialized equipment, gym access, or particular athletic background. The protocol can be performed in any flat walking environment, whether outdoors or on a treadmill. A brief warm-up prior to the first interval and a gentle cool-down following the last are considered good practice.

== Scientific research ==
=== Foundational studies (2007–2009) ===
The foundational 2007 study by Nose and Masuki enrolled 246 participants (60 men, 186 women; average age 63) divided into three groups and reported improvements in aerobic capacity, muscle strength, and blood pressure. Follow-up research published in 2009 found that five months of training improved physical fitness and lifestyle-related disease indices by 10–20%.

=== Exercise intensity and dose-response (2019) ===
A large-scale study published in Mayo Clinic Proceedings in 2019 examined whether outcomes following IWT varied with the amount of time participants spent at high intensity. Analysing data from 679 middle-aged and older adults with a mean age of 65 years who completed a five-month program, Masuki, Morikawa, and Nose found that estimated peak aerobic capacity improved by an average of 14% and a composite lifestyle-related disease score declined by 17%. Benefits were positively correlated with weekly high-intensity walking time up to approximately 50 minutes per week, beyond which the relationship plateaued. Neither total walking time nor time spent at low intensity showed a comparable dose-response pattern, establishing that exercise intensity rather than overall walking volume is the primary driver of IWT's health benefits.

=== Applications in type 2 diabetes ===
A trial published in 2013 by Karstoft and colleagues, conducted in Denmark, compared four months of IWT with energy expenditure-matched continuous walking training and a control condition in patients with type 2 diabetes. IWT produced a 16% increase in aerobic fitness and a reduction of approximately 3 kg in body fat mass. Glycemic control, assessed through continuous glucose monitoring, improved significantly in the IWT group but not in the continuous walking group, and no hypoglycemic episodes were recorded. Training adherence reached approximately 85%.

Subsequent mechanistic investigations by the same research group found that the glycemic improvements produced by IWT were attributable primarily to enhanced glucose effectiveness—the capacity of glucose to promote its own clearance from the bloodstream independently of insulin—rather than to improvements in insulin sensitivity alone. This challenged the long-standing assumption that exercise-induced improvements in blood glucose control depend principally on insulin sensitivity.

A 2025 controlled trial by Ichihara and colleagues examined IWT in patients with type 2 diabetes who also presented with lower extremity weakness. Even within this population, IWT produced significant improvements in muscle strength, walking ability, and health-related quality of life relative to a control condition.

=== Cognitive function and mental health ===
A controlled trial published in 2019 assigned 68 older adults with a mean age of 70 years to either IWT or a normal walking program for 20 weeks. Both groups showed comparable improvements on cognitive assessments including the Trail Making Test, but the IWT group demonstrated significantly greater reductions in central arterial stiffness, a measure associated with cognitive decline and dementia risk.

A comprehensive review published in 2020 by Masuki and Nose, drawing on outcome data from more than 10,000 participants, reported that five months of IWT was associated not only with improvements in physical fitness and metabolic health, but also with better sleep quality, reduced depression scores, and gains in cognitive function.

=== Large-scale and long-term evidence ===
Across more than fifteen years of accumulated research, IWT has been studied in thousands of participants spanning a range of ages, fitness levels, and clinical conditions. Adherence rates across multiple trials have been consistently high, with participants frequently exceeding their prescribed training targets.

A 2024 review co-authored by Karstoft, Masuki, and Nose synthesized the body of evidence and confirmed IWT's efficacy across outcomes including aerobic fitness, muscle strength, body composition, and metabolic health. The authors identified long-term adherence in people with chronic disease or obesity as the primary remaining challenge, and called for larger, longer trials to assess IWT's impact on hard clinical endpoints such as cardiovascular events and mortality.
