= CHOM =

CHOM or Chom may refer to:

- CHOM-FM, a radio station in Montreal, Canada
- Chom (crater), on Mars

== See also ==
- Children's Hospital of Michigan, in Detroit, Michigan
- Ham (Genesis)
