= Flossie Cohen =

Indian and American pediatric immunologist (1925–2004)

Flossie Cohen (1925–2004) was an Indian and American pediatric immunologist who spent most of her career at the Children's Hospital of Michigan. She was also a professor at the Wayne State University School of Medicine.

== Life and career ==
Cohen was born in 1925 in Kolkata, India. She later migrated to the United States and studied medicine at the University of Buffalo, graduating in 1950. She completed her residency in pediatrics at the Brooklyn Jewish Hospital. She moved to Michigan in 1953 to join the Children's Hospital of Michigan. There, she began research in the field of pediatric and neonatal immunology. She set up the hospital's clinical immunology laboratory and its service for clinical immunology and rheumatology; she directed both departments until her retirement in 1992. She was also a professor at the Wayne State University School of Medicine.

In 1972, Cohen was the co-author of a landmark study that was the first to demonstrate a biochemical basis for severe combined immunodeficiency. She continued to study immunodeficiency disorders. With the outbreak of the HIV/AIDS epidemic in the 1980s, she started an HIV clinic at the Children's Hospital of Michigan in 1985. She was also involved in clinical trials for the perinatal transmission of HIV.

In 1975, Cohen became the first person in Michigan to successfully perform a bone marrow transplant in a child. She was also the first person to fluoresce red blood cells. She was inducted into the Michigan Women's Hall of Fame in 1994 for her achievements in medicine and science.

Cohen died in 2004.

== See also ==
- Timeline of women in science
