= Eleonore Hutzel =

American social worker (1884–1978)

Eleonore Hutzel (September 8, 1884 – February 14, 1978) was a nurse and social worker in Detroit, Michigan, who was known for her efforts on behalf of women's health and welfare. The Hutzel Women's Hospital and the Eleonore Hutzel Recovery Center, both in Detroit, are named in her honor. She was inducted into the Michigan Women's Hall of Fame in 1999.

== Early life and education ==
Eleonore Louise Hutzel was born in Ann Arbor, Michigan, in 1885, the oldest of five children of Titus Hutzel, a businessman and city official, and his first wife, Emma (Brehm) Hutzel. She moved to Detroit in 1910 to study obstetrics at the Women's Hospital and nursing at Harper Hospital. During her time in Detroit, she also worked as a visiting nurse.

After completing her nurse's training, Hutzel moved to Chicago, Illinois, to study at what later became the School of Social Service Administration.

== Career ==
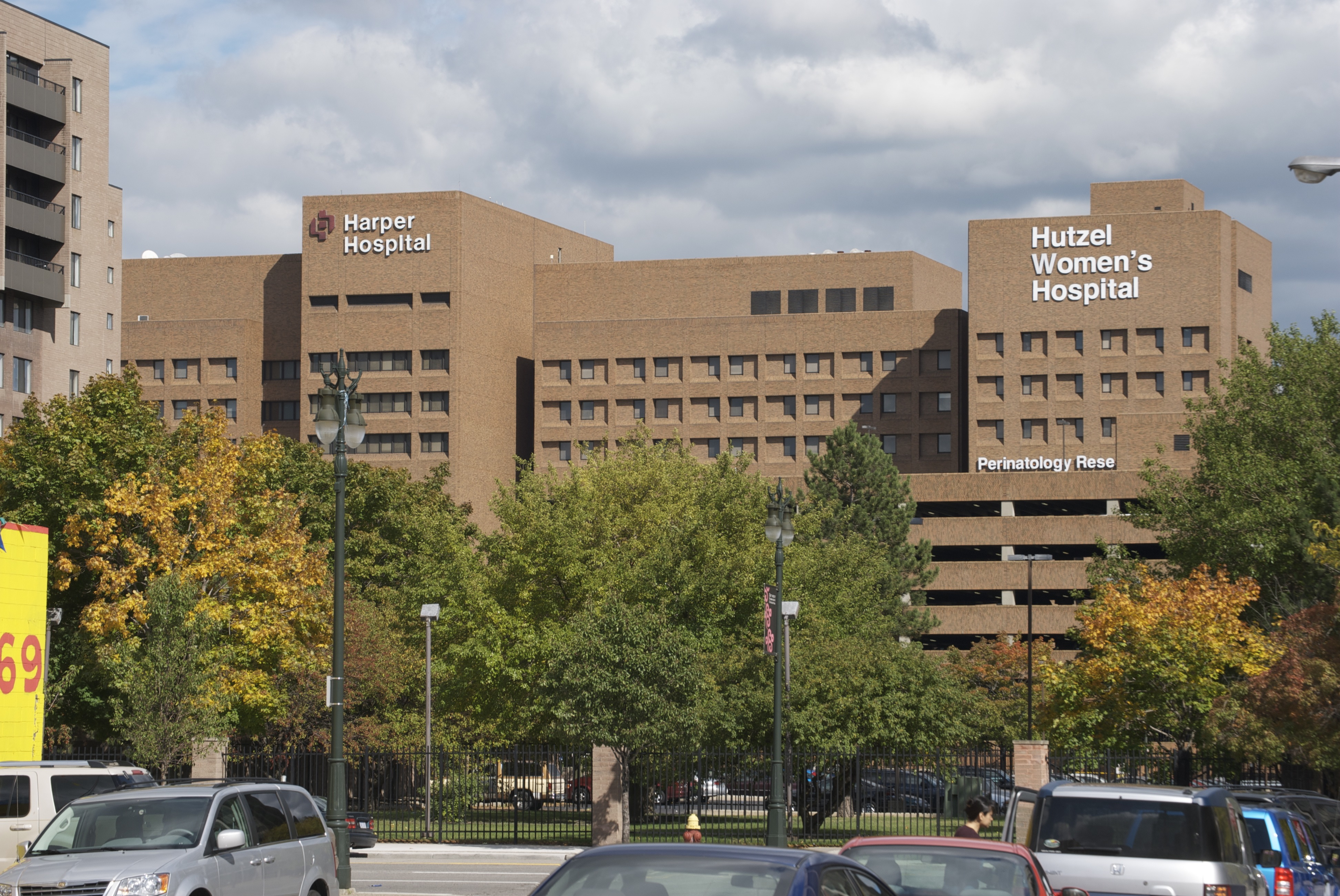
Harper Hospital and Hutzel Women's Hospital, Detroit Medical Center

In 1915, Hutzel became the first director of social services for unwed mothers and their families at Detroit's Women's Hospital. In this capacity, she worked on a wide range of their needs, for example championing a program that aimed to provide breast milk to all children who needed it.

Hutzel became involved with the Detroit Girls' Protective League (GPL) as a board member. The GPL led to the founding of a Women's Division of the Detroit Police Department that was charged with protecting children up to age 10 and girls up to age 17, as well as handling crimes involving women. In 1922, Hutzel became the first woman to head up the division, then only a year old. The newly appointed police commissioner did not think such a division was needed and gave Hutzel only six months to prove its value. Her success is evident in the fact that at the end of the trial period she was named chief of the Women's Division and a deputy commissioner. Over 40 police personnel reported to her, and her division became a national model of its kind.

In 1933, Hutzel published a book, The Policewoman's Handbook, in which she laid out her view of the necessity for linking police work with social services and offered advice for standardizing policies and procedures for women in police work. She covered such topics as investigation, criminal law, patrol work, and the importance of equal pay and equal training for policewomen. It became the standard reference in police departments for the succeeding quarter of a century.

In 1939, Hutzel became a trustee of Detroit's Women's Hospital, serving in this capacity for many decades. In recognition of her contributions to the hospital itself, to the city's social services, and to public health, the hospital's name was changed in 1964 to the Hutzel Women's Hospital. It is now part of the Detroit Medical Center. The Eleonore Hutzel Recovery Center, a mental health and substance abuse rehabilitation facility in Detroit that largely serves women, is also named after her.

In the 1950s, Hutzel served on a new six-member corrections commissions that took control of Michigan's prison system.

Hutzel died in February 1979.
