= A. B. Lull =

American physician and politician

Member of the Washington House of Representatives
- In office 1889–1891

Personal details
- Born: Alphonso Ben Lull c. 1844 Pennsylvania, United States
- Died: February 25, 1929 (aged 84) Redlands, California, United States
- Party: None (Independent)

Alphonso Ben Lull (c. 1844 – February 25, 1929) was an American physician and politician who served in the Washington House of Representatives from 1889 to 1891.

Lull was born in Pennsylvania and attended the Michigan College of Medicine (which has since become part of Wayne State University). He was living in Albuquerque, New Mexico in 1888, when he was arrested on charges of desertion and adultery, after his wife alleged he committed "improper relations" with a widow of one of his patients.

That year he moved to Port Angeles, Washington and then to California in 1908.
