= Christopher T. Leland =

American novelist

- Born: Christopher Towne Leland; October 17, 1951; Tulsa, Oklahoma, U.S.
- Died: July 23, 2012 (aged 60); Detroit Receiving Hospital, Detroit, Michigan, U.S.
- Education: Pomona College; University of California, San Diego
- Occupation: Novelist

Christopher Towne Leland (October 17, 1951 – July 23, 2012) was an American novelist.

== Early life and education ==
Leland was born October 17, 1951, in Tulsa, Oklahoma. He grew up in Tulsa; Charlotte, North Carolina; and Huntington Beach, California. He attended Pomona College, graduating in 1973. He then attended the University of California, San Diego, receiving his doctorate in 1982.

== Career ==
Leland taught at Wayne State University in Detroit, Michigan, starting in 1990.

== Death and legacy ==
Leland died on July 23, 2012, of chronic obstructive pulmonary disease.

== Works ==
- Mean Time. Random House. 1982. OCLC 610600787.
- The Last Happy Men: The Generation of 1922, Fiction, and the Argentine Reality. NY. 1986. ISBN 0-8156-2376-3. OCLC 461922232.
- Mrs. Randall. Houghton Mifflin. 1987. ISBN 0-395-42729-0. OCLC 637416600.
- The Book of Marvels. New York: Scribner. 1989. ISBN 0-684-19135-0. OCLC 19777634.
- The Professor of Aesthetics (First ed.). Cambridge, Massachusetts: Zoland Books. 1994. ISBN 978-0-944072-37-0.
- Letting Loose (First ed.). Cambridge, Massachusetts: Zoland Books. 1996. ISBN 978-0-944072-69-1.
- The Art of Compelling Fiction: How to Write a Page-Turner. Cincinnati, Ohio: Story Press. 1998. ISBN 1-884910-30-0. OCLC 37890549.
- The Creative Writer's Style Guide: Rules and Advice for Writing Fiction and Creative Nonfiction. Writers Digest Books. 2002. ISBN 1-884910-55-6. OCLC 49991455.
- Love/Imperfect. Wayne State University Press. 2011. ISBN 978-0814334959. OCLC 755633566.
