= Margo Cohen =

American physician and scientist

Margo P. Cohen
- Education: University of Michigan Medical School; University of Buenos Aires
- Occupations: Physician, entrepreneur
- Employer: Glycadia
- Known for: Diabetes research
- Title: President and Chief Scientific Officer

Margo Panush Cohen is an American physician and entrepreneur. She has been a Professor of Internal Medicine and Chief of Endocrinology and Metabolism at the Wayne State University School of Medicine and the University of Medicine and Dentistry of New Jersey. She is President and Chief Scientific Officer of Glycadia, and a founder of its subsidiary Exocell.

== Education ==
Cohen earned a BS from the University of Michigan and an MD from the University of Michigan Medical School. She held an internship at Sinai Hospital in Detroit, Michigan and a residency at Detroit's Henry Ford Hospital. She was then awarded fellowships from the Public Health Service and the National Institutes of Health and pursued doctoral studies in biochemistry at Wayne State University. Moving with her family to Argentina, she completed her doctoral program at the University of Buenos Aires.

== Career ==
Returning from Argentina, Cohen joined the faculty of Wayne State University School of Medicine as Assistant Professor of Medicine, becoming Full Professor and head of Endocrinology and Metabolism at the Medical Center's Detroit Receiving Hospital. In 1982 she became Professor of Medicine and Head of the Division of Endocrinology and Metabolism at the University of Medicine and Dentistry of New Jersey. She received a Fulbright Scholarship in 1986 for a sabbatical in Israel at the Beilinson Hospital/University of Tel Aviv.

Cohen founded Exocell in 1988 to develop diabetes-related diagnostic products, and subsequently established Glycadia to develop therapeutic products. The company received initial financing from venture funds and the Commonwealth of Pennsylvania. Its first FDA-approved diagnostic product was Albuwell, a test that detects diabetic kidney disease, followed by other diagnostic products approved by the U.S. Food and Drug Administration (FDA) to monitor diabetes management and complications. She holds twelve patents in the field of diabetes treatment. She continues to be the President and Chief Scientific Officer of Glycadia, .

Cohen has been editor-in chief- of the Journal Endocrinology and served on study sections of the National Institutes of Health. She was twice appointed Chairman of the Board of Scientific Counselors for the National Institute of Dental Research at the National Institutes of Health. She was elected a member of the American Society for Clinical Investigation in 1982 and is currently an emeritus member of the society.

== Research ==
Cohen has contributed to several areas in endocrine and diabetes research. While in graduate school, she uncovered the mechanism by which the anti-convulsant aminoglutethemide interferes with the production of adrenal steroids, leading to clinical use of the drug in hormone-dependent cancers. In Argentina she studied the effects of diabetes, insulin and pituitary hormones on protein synthesis and vascular metabolism. As a visiting scientist in England, she examined effects of diabetes on basement membranes. In Israel, Cohen discovered the increased prevalence of diabetes in young Ethiopian immigrants and linked it to radical changes in dietary habits. She has also researched immune factors diabetes and the cause of kidney, eye and vascular complications tied to diabetes, uncovering the role of increased nonenzymatic glycation in their genesis and identifying abnormalities in the production of matrix components and in signaling pathways inhibition.

== Publishing ==
Cohen has authored and edited numerous books in the areas of diabetes, endocrinology and metabolism. These include:

1. Diabetes and Protein Glycosylation: Methods of Measurement and Biologic Relevance; Springer Verlag, New York(1986) ISBN 0-387-96297-2
2. The Polyol Paradigm and Complications of Diabetes; Springer Verlag, New York (1987) ISBN 0-387-96418-5
3. Special Topics in Endocrinology and Metabolism; Alan R. Liss, Inc., New York(1979) ISBN 0-8451-0700-3; (1980) ISBN 0-8451-0701-1; (1981) ISBN 0-8451-0702-X; (1982)ISBN 0-8451-0703-8; (1983) ISBN 0-8451-0704-6; (1984) ISBN 0-8451-0705-4; (1985) ISBN 0-8451-0706-2
4. Endocrinology & Metabolism: Hormone Resistance and Endocrine Paradoxes;Springer Verlag, New York (1987) ISBN 0-387-96517-3
5. Controversies in Diabetes and Pregnancy; Springer Verlag, New York (1988) ISBN 0-387-96622-6
6. The Brain as an Endocrine Organ; Springer Verlag, New York(1989) ISBN 0-387-96644-7
7. Diabetes and Autoimmunity; Springer Verlag, New York (1990) ISBN 0-387-96645-5
8. Diabetes and Protein Glycation. Clinical and Pathophysiological Relevance;JC Press, Philadelphia(1996) ISBN 0-9654654-0-3

== Personal life ==
Cohen married her college boyfriend, Perry M. Cohen, an investment banker, and she is the mother of three sons:.
