= Leonard Berry =

American professor (born 1942)

- Born: 1942 (age 83–84)

Academic background
- Education: Arizona State University; University of Denver

Academic work
- Discipline: Marketing
- Institutions: Texas A&M University

Leonard L. "Len" Berry (born 1942) is a University Distinguished Professor of Marketing of Mays Business School at Texas A&M University, and a senior fellow at the Institute for Healthcare Improvement. Berry is a past president of the American Marketing Association. He has studied service delivery in healthcare at the Mayo Clinic and in cancer care settings. Berry is Texas A&M's most cited faculty member on Google Scholar, with over 235,000 citations.

== Career ==
Berry earned bachelor's and master's degrees at the University of Denver and a Ph.D. at Arizona State University. A longtime professor at Texas A&M University, Berry founded the school's Center for Retailing Studies in 1982 and directed it for 18 years. In 1983, Berry coined the term relationship marketing, which emphasizes the need for organizations to maintain (rather than simply acquire) customers. He is a founder of the services marketing discipline.

He is a University Distinguished Professor of Marketing and Regents Professor, and holds the M. B. Zale Chair in Retailing and Marketing Leadership in the Mays Business School at Texas A&M. He has studied healthcare service improvement in association with the Mayo Clinic, Henry Ford Health, and other health systems, and as a senior fellow at the Institute for Healthcare Improvement. Much of Berry's work has focused on service delivery in cancer care.

Berry and his wife, Nancy, established the Berry-AMA Book Prize for the Best Book in Marketing for the American Marketing Association (AMA), the Mae Berry Award in Service Excellence at Mayo Clinic, and an endowed chair in Service Marketing at Mays Business School. He is a past recipient of the AMA/Irwin/McGraw-Hill Distinguished Marketing Educator award, the Sheth Gold Medal in Marketing, the Paul D. Converse Award, the A&M William Wilke "Marketing for a Better World: Award, and the Presidential Professor for Teaching Award..

Berry has served on the board of directors of Genesco, Lowe's, Darden Restaurants, and the Nemours Foundation.

== Notable publications ==
- Management Lessons from Mayo Clinic, New York: McGraw-Hill, June 2008, 276 pp. (with Kent Seltman).
- Discovering the Soul of Service: The Nine Drivers of Sustainable Business Success, New York: The Free Press, 1999, 269 pp.
- On Great Service: A Framework for Action, New York: The Free Press, 1995, 292 pp.
- Marketing Services: Competing Through Quality, New York: The Free Press, 1991, 212 pp. (with A. Parasuraman).
- Delivering Quality Service: Balancing Customer Perceptions and Expectations, New York: The Free Press, 1990, 256 pp. (with A. Parasuraman and Valarie A. Zeithaml).
- Berry L, Letchuman S, Khaldun J, Hole M (2023). How Hospitals Improve Health Equity Through Community-Centered Innovation. NEJM Catalyst.
- Berry L, Letchuman S, Ramani N, Barach P (2021). The High Stakes of Outsourcing in Health Care. Mayo Clinic Proceedings.
- Berry L, Awdish R (2021). Health Care Organizations Should Be as Generous as Their Workers. Annals of Internal Medicine.
- Berry L, Danaher T, Aksoy L, Keiningham T (2020). Service safety in the pandemic age. Journal of Service Research.
- Berry L, Jacobson J, Spears P, Steffensen, K, Attai, D (2020). Proposing a Bill of Rights for Patients with Cancer. JCO Oncology Practice.
- Berry L (2019). Service Guarantees Have a Place in Health Care. Annals of Internal Medicine
- Berry L (2018). Service Innovation is Urgent in Healthcare. AMS Review.
- Berry L, Deming K, Danaher T (2018). Improving Nonclinical and Clinical-Support Services: Lessons From Oncology. Mayo Clinic Proceedings.
- Berry L, Danaher T, Beckham D, Awdish R, Mate K (2017). When Patients and Their Families Feel Like Hostages to Health Care. Mayo Clinic Proceedings.
- Berry L, Danaher T, Chapman R, Awdish R (2017). Role of Kindness in Cancer Care. Journal of Oncology Practice.
- Berry L, Dalwadi S, Jacobson J (2017). Supporting the Supporters: What Family Caregivers Need to Care for a Loved One with Cancer. Journal of Oncology Practice.
- Berry L, Davis S, Wilmet J (2015). When the Customer is Stressed. Harvard Business Review.
