= Phyllis Harrison-Ross =

American psychiatrist

- Born: August 14, 1936; Detroit, Michigan
- Died: January 16, 2017 (aged 80); Manhattan, New York City, New York, United States
- Occupation: Psychiatrist

Phyllis Harrison-Ross (August 14, 1936 – January 16, 2017) was an American psychiatrist who pioneered programs for developmentally disabled and mentally ill children.

== Early life and education ==
She received a B.S. from Albion College in 1956 and an M.D. from Wayne State University School of Medicine in 1959. She completed a fellowship at the Albert Einstein College of Medicine from 1964 to 1966.

== Career ==
She instructed at several institutions including Cornell Medical School and New York Medical College. She sat on the Medical Review Board of the New York State Commission of Corrections several times and became the chair in 2008. She served as director and chief of psychiatry at Metropolitan Hospital Community Health Center. She was a member of the American Psychiatric Association and Black Psychiatrists of America, and was president of the latter from 1976 to 1978.

She was the first in her field to start programs for children with developmental disabilities and mental illnesses. Her programs were implemented in public schools and reduced the institutionalization of children. She also studied the effects of poverty on children and treated children for phobias. In the 1970s, she hosted a talk show and co-hosted a radio show that educated parents. After 9/11, the World Trade Center attack, and Hurricane Katrina, she helped victims recover from disaster-induced mental illness.

She received the Leadership in Medicine Award of the Susan Smith McKinney Stewart Society in 1978, the Award of Merit of the Public Health Association of New York City in 1980, and the Solomon Carter Fuller Award of the American Psychiatric Association in 2004.

== Death ==
Harrison-Ross died of lung cancer on January 16, 2017.
