= ADHD Grown Up: A Guide to Adolescent and Adult ADHD =

2007 book by Joel L. Young

- Author: Joel L. Young
- Language: English
- Genre: Non-fiction
- Published: January 9th, 2007
- Publisher: Norton, W. W. & Company, Inc.
- Publication place: United States
- Media type: Print (hardcover)
- Pages: 344
- ISBN: 9780393704686

ADHD Grown Up: A Guide to Adolescent and Adult ADHD (2007) is a book by Joel L. Young. It is a guide for psychiatrists and the lay public for the diagnosis and treatment of ADHD in adolescents and adults.

The book was positively reviewed in Psychiatric Services where Dr. Sickel of the Department of Psychiatry, University of North Carolina at Chapel Hill, said the book "feels like Young is leading a young resident or first-year child fellow by the hand through the various steps involved in making a good diagnosis." Diana Pederson reviewed it in Metapsychology, saying it was accessible to professionals and non-professionals alike. Marcia McCabe writing in PsycCRITIQUES said the book "gives an excellent overview of the topic area and provides practical information and guidance to the treating clinician." The book was also reviewed in Journal of Family Therapy, and SciTech Book News.

The book had a sequel Contemporary Guide to Adult ADHD (2009), about adults with ADHD. It outlines clinical guidelines and recommended pharmacotherapies for the treatment of adult men and women.

The author is a physician based in Rochester Hills, Michigan. He is the medical director and founder of the Rochester Center for Behavioral Medicine, assistant clinical professor of psychiatry at the Wayne State University School of Medicine, and staff physician at William Beaumont Hospital.

== Editions ==
- Joel L. Young, M.D.; ADHD Grown Up: A Guide to Adolescent and Adult ADHD. New York, W. W. Norton, 2007
