= DMC Surgery Hospital =

DMC Surgery Hospital (CLOSED INDEFINITELY)
- Detroit Medical Center

Geography
- Location: 30671 Stephenson Highway; Madison Heights, Oakland County, Michigan, United States
- Coordinates: 42.51785°N 83.1202°W

Organization
- Type: Specialist
- Network: Detroit Medical Center

Services
- Emergency department: No
- Speciality: Surgery

Helipads
- Helipad: No

History
- Founded: 2003
- Closed: 2014 (indefinite closure due to flooding)

Links
- Website: www.dmcsurgeryhospital.org
- Lists: Hospitals in Michigan

DMC Surgery Hospital was one of the eight hospitals/Institutions composing the Detroit Medical Center. DMC Surgery Hospital was dedicated to the surgical needs of adults and children. Surgery for adults covered the full range of orthopaedic surgeries, neurosurgery relative to the spine and podiatric surgery. In association with the Children's Hospital of Michigan, surgery for pediatric patients primarily provided services for all outpatient surgical needs. The major emphasis of the facility was a commitment to orthopaedic sports medicine which includes services for both adults and adolescents. The hospital also offered 24-hour emergency care and psychiatric inpatient services.

== History ==
The Detroit Medical Center first opened this site in Madison Heights, Michigan in March 2003 as Michigan Orthopaedic Specialty Hospital. It was the first hospital in the state to offer inpatient and outpatient surgical care exclusively focused on orthopaedics. In addition, it provided a 24-hour general Emergency Room to the community. The hospital also continued to provide services through Madison Behavioral Health Services, which it acquired with the purchase of the site.

The hospital grew to also include a full-service radiology department with MRI and ultrasound technology, a Back Pain Clinic and an off-site Wound Care Center. Recently, it expanded to include outpatient surgical services performed by the doctors of DMC Children's Hospital of Michigan. On July 10, 2008, the facility was renamed the DMC Surgery Hospital to better represent this broader range of services to adults and children.

On July 1, 2014, the facility eliminated its Emergency Services and became an Urgent Care facility.

== Closure ==
On August 11, 2014, the Metro Detroit Area experienced a storm that dropped an official total of 4.57 inches of rain on the area, with some locations receiving more than six inches and during this storm this hospital suffered extensive water damage. On September 30, 2014, DMC announced that it would close the facility beginning October 3, 2014 with all work completed October 10, 2014. The Detroit News reported that 127 employees would be laid-off until DMC can reassign them to other facilities.

As of summer 2017, the structure is on the real estate market.
