= Gabriel Steiner =

German-American neurologist

Gabriel Steiner (26 May 1883, Ulm – 10 August 1965, Detroit) was a German-American neurologist known for his research of multiple sclerosis. In his studies, he postulated a link between multiple sclerosis and certain forms of spirochetes.

Of Jewish ancestry, he studied medicine at the Ludwig-Maximilians-Universität München, the University of Würzburg, the University of Freiburg, and the University of Strasbourg, receiving his doctorate at the latter university in 1910. In 1913, he qualified as a lecturer in neurology and psychiatry, and from 1920, worked as an associate professor at Heidelberg University. Here, he was also head of the laboratory for pathological anatomy at the psychiatric-neurological clinic.

In 1936, he immigrated to the United States, where from 1937 to 1954, he served as a professor of neurology and neuropathology at Wayne State University School of Medicine in Detroit. In retirement, he was director of the Michigan Multiple Sclerosis Center.

== Publications ==
Works published in English:

- Multiple sclerosis. J Mich State Med Soc. 1950 Aug; 49(8):938-40.
- Experimental allergic encephalomyelitis, spontaneous demyelinating disease and multiple sclerosis. Gaz Med Port. 1951; 4(3):824-34.
- Environmental studies in multiple sclerosis. Neurology. 1952 May-Jun; 2(3):260-2
- Acute plaques in multiple sclerosis, their pathogenetic significance and the role of spirochetes as etiological factor. J Neuropathol Exp Neurol. 1952 Oct; 11(4):343-72
- Morphology of Spirochaeta myelophthora in multiple sclerosis. J Neuropathol Exp Neurol. 1954 Jan; 13(1):221-9.
- Comparison of general paresis and multiple sclerosis in regard to the etiological agent. J Neuropathol Exp Neurol. 1954 Jul; 13(3):492-6.

Works published in German:

- Epilepsie und Gliom, 1910 (dissertation thesis)
- Klinik der Neurosyphilis. In: Handbuch der Haut- und Geschlechtskrankheiten, volume 17, 1; Berlin, 1929.
- Multiple und diffuse Sklerose. In: Handbuch der Geisteskrankheiten, volume 11; Berlin, 1930.
- Krankheitserreger und Gewebsbefund bei multipler Sklerose. Berlin, 1930.
- Die körperlichen Erscheinungen. with Alfred A. Strauss (1897-1957).
- Anatomisches. In: Handbuch der Geisteskrankheiten, volume 9; Berlin, 1932.
- Multiple Sklerose, ihre Ätiologie, Pathologie, Pathogenese und Therapie, 1962.
