= Tinlinn Apartments =

- U.S. National Register of Historic Places
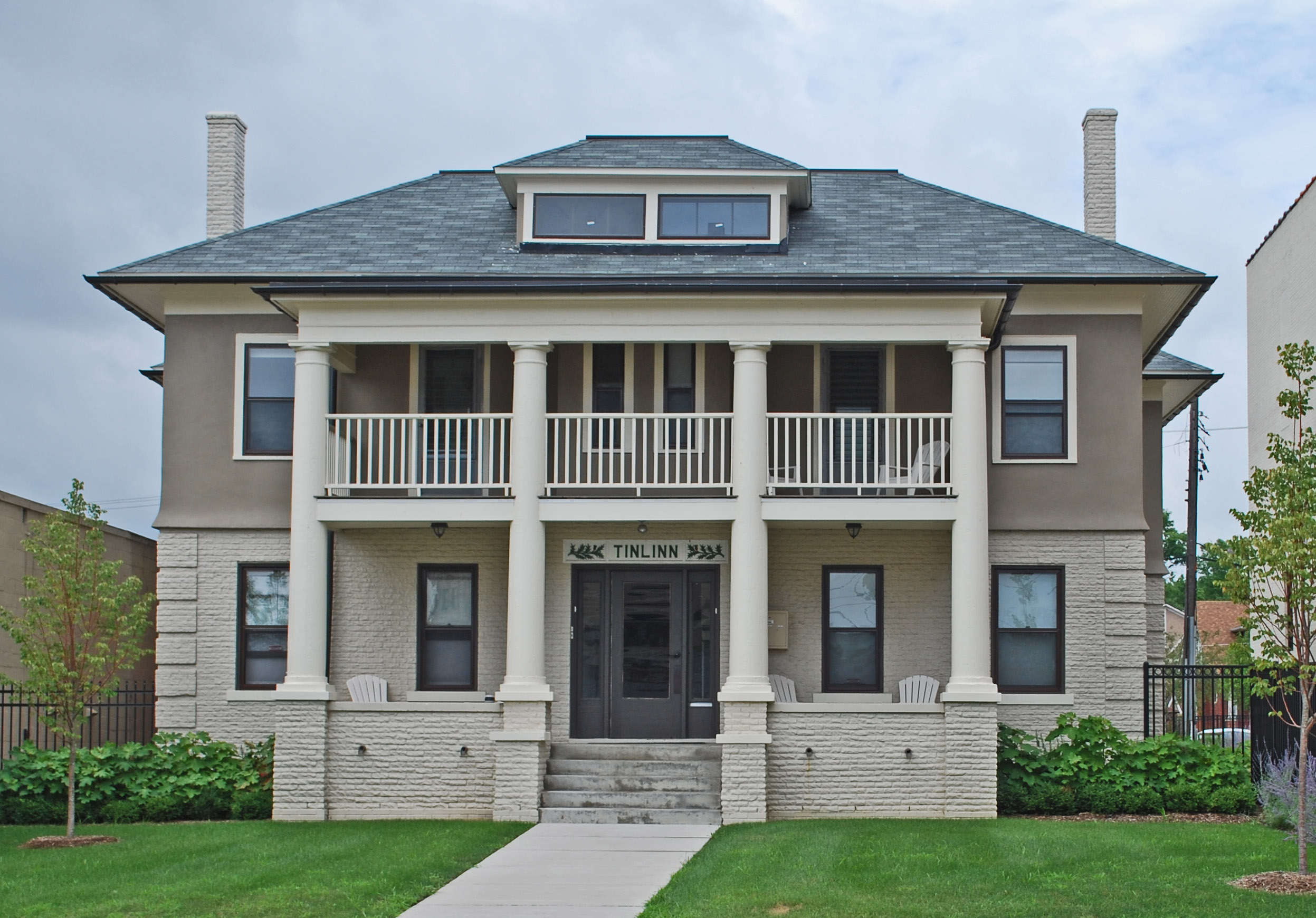
- Interactive map
- Location: 413 Garland St., Flint, Michigan
- Coordinates: 43°01′9″N 83°41′43″W
- Area: 0.1 acres (0.040 ha)
- Built: 1911
- Architectural style: Bungalow/Craftsman
- NRHP reference No.: 08000220
- Added to NRHP: March 27, 2008

The Tinlinn Apartments is an apartment building located at 413 Garland Street in Flint, Michigan. The building was listed on the National Register of Historic Places in 2008.

== History ==
Flint at the beginning of the twentieth century was experiencing explosive growth tied to the growth of the automotive industry. The city's population nearly tripled from 1900 to 1910, and continued increasing into the 1930s. This increase in population severely crimped the housing supply in the area, and the housing market boomed as a result. In 1909, Nelson C. and Helen Webster purchased this lot on Garland Street. Webster was the secretary of the W. F. Stewart Company, a carriage-building firm and then supplier for the automotive industry. The Garland Street neighborhood at that time was an upscale area home to many leading industrialists.

In 1911, the Websters constructed the Tinlinn Apartments, as an upscale residence for upper middle-class businesspeople and professionals. The Websters lived in the Tinlinn until at least 1916, and the majority of the other early tenants were executives of businesses associated with the automobile industry. John C. Berridge, owner of the Flint Drug Company, purchased the Tinlinn in 1919 and moved in. In 1928, Berridge opened the next-door Berridge Hotel. The Tinlinn continued as a four-unit apartment building until it was closed in 1999; it was rehabilitated about ten years later and reopened, as part of the same project that rehabilitated the next-door Berridge Hotel.

== Description ==
The Tinlinn Apartments is a two-story brick and stucco Arts and Crafts apartment building containing four units, two on each floor. The building sits on a raised foundation and has a hipped roof with deep overhanging eaves. The foundation level and the first story are clad with brick, with quoins at the corners; the second story is covered with stucco. A two-story central porch, three bays wide, fronts the main facade. The porch has a base and first floor railing matching the brick of the building, and four Tuscan columns continuing to the roof. The second floor of the porch has a wood railing between the columns. The porch shelters a central projecting entrance with a wood entrance door flanked by sidelights. Two sets of double-hung windows are located to each side. The second floor contains double-hung windows in the central by, with a wood entrance door and a double-hung window on each side. A wide hip-roof dormer is located in the center of the front roof.
