= Chest (journal) =

- Discipline: Pulmonology, cardiology
- Language: English
- Edited by: Richard S. Irwin

Publication details
- Former name(s): Diseases of the Chest
- History: 1935–present
- Publisher: American College of Chest Physicians (United States)
- Frequency: Monthly
- Impact factor: 10.262 (2021)

Standard abbreviations
- ISO 4: Chest

Indexing
- CODEN: CHETBF
- ISSN: 0012-3692 (print); 1931-3543 (web)
- LCCN: 91645423
- OCLC no.: 01554067

Links
- Journal homepage; Online access; Online archives

Chest is a peer-reviewed medical journal covering chest diseases and related issues, including pulmonology, cardiology, thoracic surgery, transplantation, breathing, airway diseases, and emergency medicine. The journal was established in 1935 and is published by the American College of Chest Physicians. The editor-in-chief is Peter Mazzone (Cleveland Clinic Respiratory Institute).

== Abstracting and indexing ==
The journal is abstracted and indexed in:

- Academic OneFile
- Academic Search
- BIOSIS Previews
- CAB Abstracts
- Chemical Abstracts
- CINAHL
- Current Contents/Clinical Medicine
- Current Contents/Life Sciences
- Elsevier BIOBASE
- Embase
- Global Health
- Index Medicus/MEDLINE/PubMed
- Science Citation Index
- Scopus
- Tropical Diseases Bulletin

According to the Journal Citation Reports, the journal has a 2021 impact factor of 10.262.
