= Detroit Receiving Hospital =

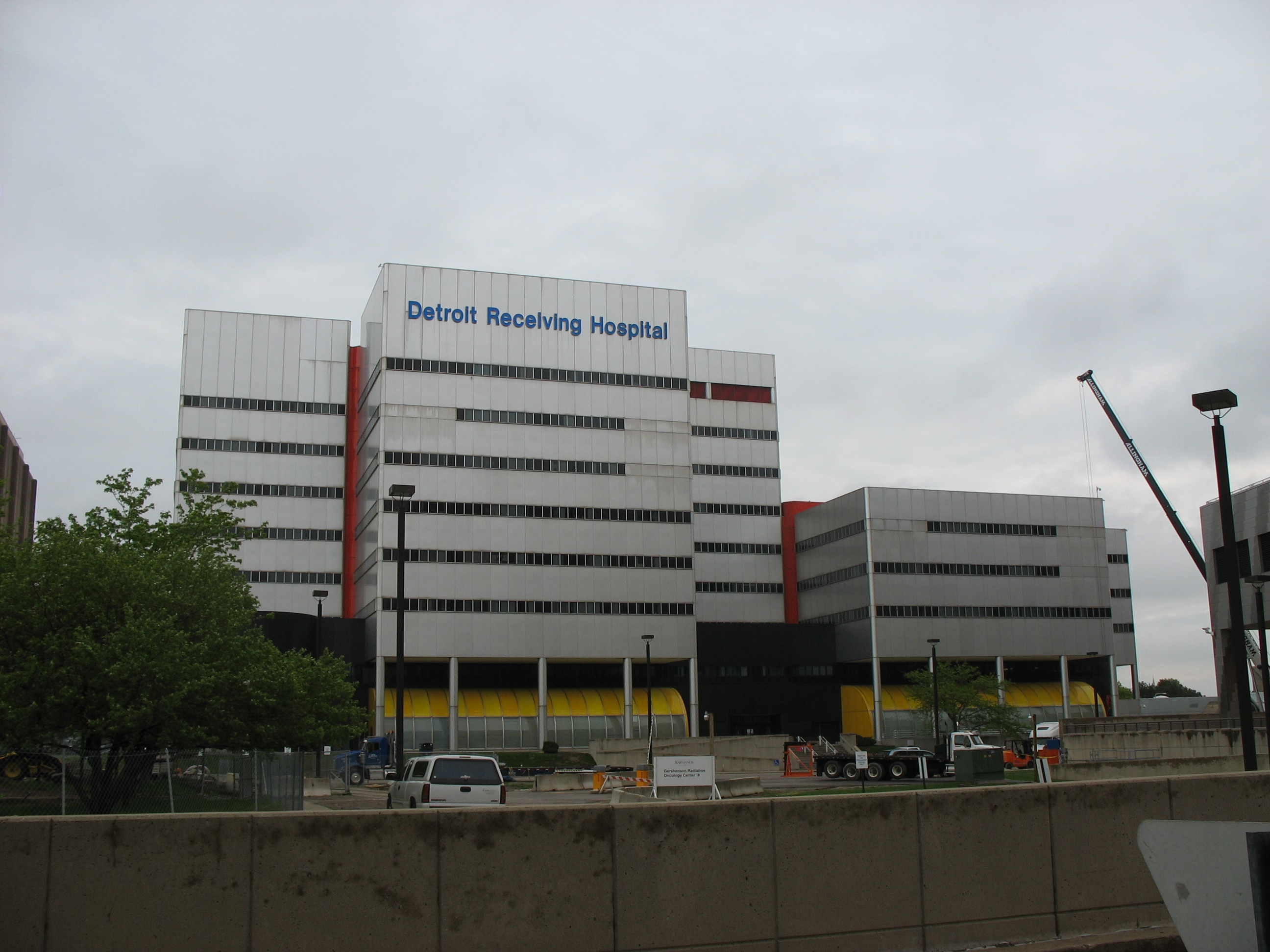
- DRH from the west, looking at the University Health Center portion

Geography
- Location: Detroit, Michigan, United States
- Coordinates: 42.3537°N 83.0543°W

Organization
- Affiliated university: Wayne State University School of Medicine

Services
- Emergency department: Level I trauma center
- Beds: 273

History
- Founded: 1915

Links
- Lists: Hospitals in Michigan

Detroit Receiving Hospital in Detroit, Michigan, is the state's first Level I Trauma Center. Receiving's emergency department treats more than 105,000 patients annually, and nearly 60% of Michigan's emergency physicians are trained at Receiving. Receiving also features the state's largest burn center, Michigan's first hospital-based 24/7 hyperbaric oxygen therapy program, and Metro Detroit's first certified primary stroke center. In addition, the hospital has a comprehensive neurosurgical unit. It is one of the eight hospitals and institutions that comprise the Detroit Medical Center.

== History ==
Detroit Receiving Hospital (DRH) was founded in 1915 as a city-owned hospital, dedicated to caring for everyone, regardless of ability to pay. In 1965, the hospital was renamed Detroit General, and maintained that mission. In 1980, Detroit General moved to a new 320-bed facility and reclaimed the name Detroit Receiving Hospital.

DRH was the first American College of Surgeons verified Level I Trauma Center in Michigan, and one of the first in the nation. Focusing on adult medical care for emergency, trauma, and critically ill patients, the majority of DRH patients arrive through the emergency department. The University Health Center clinics adjacent to Detroit Receiving treat more than 250,000 patients annually, making it one of the busiest ambulatory facilities in the country.

Approximately 95% of the physicians on staff at the hospital also serve on the faculty of Wayne State University School of Medicine. In 1976, before emergency medicine was recognized as a specialty, Detroit Receiving began a postgraduate emergency medicine training program. Nearly half the physicians currently practicing in Michigan have received some of their training at Detroit Receiving Hospital. On May 2, 2018, Tenet decided to terminate its century long contract with Wayne State University School of Medicine. Tenet CEO cited a letter sent April 27, 2018, in which Wayne State threatened to sever ties if a deal was not reached on May 15, 2018. Anonymous members of Wayne State University Physician Group said that Tenet had already had plans to sever ties prior. Many conflicts arose during the tumultuous relationship including Tenet's unwillingness to contribute to medical student education and reinvest profits to medical research which is typical of true academic research centers.

== Clinical specialties ==
Specialties at Detroit Receiving include emergency medicine, orthopaedic traumatology, neurosurgery, cardiology, trauma surgery, and burn treatment, earning national and international recognition for the hospital. DRH was also the site of the first cranioplasty, using a pre-cast replica of missing bone to repair a skull.

Detroit Receiving, along with Harper University Hospital, is home to Cardio Team One, a cardiac care program designed to improve the response time for patients presenting at an emergency department with severe cardiac disease.

== Training programs ==
Detroit Receiving is the site of Wayne State University School of Medicine affiliated residency and fellowship training programs, including anesthesiology, emergency medicine, general surgery, neurosurgery, ophthalmology, otolaryngology, neurology, orthopedic surgery, pathology, podiatry, psychiatry, radiology, and urology.

Established in 1976 by Brooks Bock and Judith Tintinalli, Detroit Receiving Hospital Emergency Medicine Residency Program is one of nation's first training program in emergency medicine and the first program of its type to be established in the state of Michigan.

== Detroit Trauma Symposium ==
Detroit Receiving hosts the longest-running, annual trauma conference in the country, the Detroit Trauma Symposium.

== Art collection ==
The facility received an award from the American Institute of Architecture for design, and houses an art collection, composed of donations to DRH over a 30-year period. The collection features more than 1,200 pieces, estimated at more than $3 million, one of the largest hospital-based collections in the nation.

== Accreditation ==
Detroit Receiving Hospital is listed in The Leapfrog Group’s 2008 Top Hospital list for patient quality and safety. The Leapfrog group identified 33 hospitals, (26 adult and 7 pediatric) which have achieved the highest level for quality and safety practices. Detroit Receiving Hospital also received Magnet Status in 2009
