= Hutzel Women's Hospital =

- Detroit Medical Center
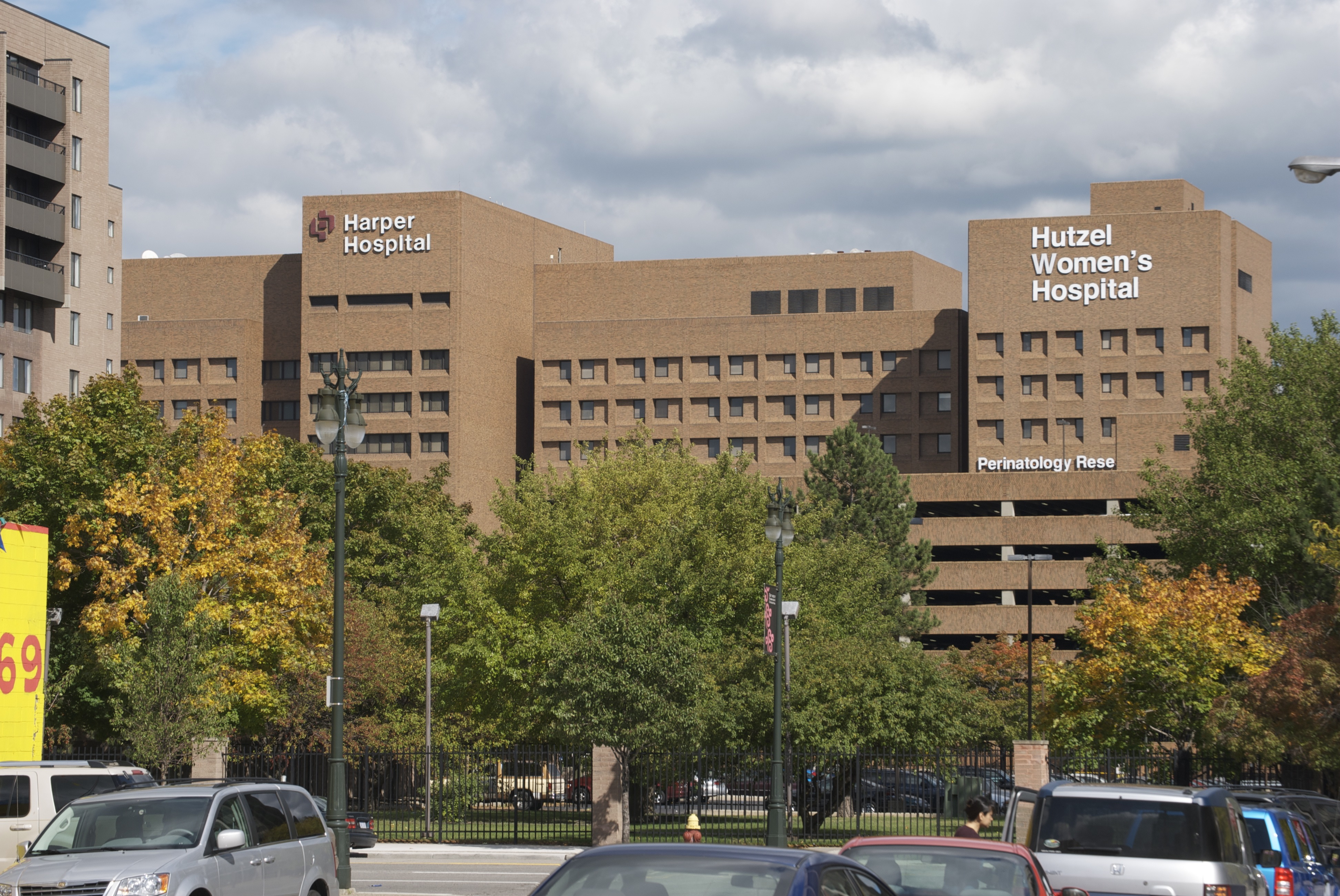
- Harper Hospital and Hutzel Women's Hospital

Geography
- Location: Detroit, Michigan, United States
- Coordinates: 42.35186°N 83.05682°W

Organization
- Type: Specialist

Services
- Speciality: Women

History
- Founded: 1868

Links
- Website: www.hutzel.org
- Lists: Hospitals in Michigan

Hutzel Women's Hospital, formerly the Women's Hospital and Foundling's Home, is one of the eight institutions that compose the Detroit Medical Center. The hospital itself is connected to Harper University Hospital, on the midtown Detroit campus of the Medical Center. It is the only hospital in Southeast Michigan dedicated to women's care.

== History ==
Sarah Gertrude Banks and Florence Hudson founded the all-women Free Dispensary for Women and Children at the establishment on March 1, 1893. It cared for people for free and helped to improve the staff.

The current hospital building was designed by architect Albert Kahn. Construction started in 1928 and the hospital was dedicated on June 18, 1929.

It was first known as the Women's Hospital and Foundling's Home. (Note: Also known then as the Women's Hospital and Foundling Institute.) In 1965 the hospital was renamed Hutzel Women's Hospital in honor of Eleonore Hutzel, recognizing her 54 years of service as a student, employee, and trustee of the hospital.

Hutzel is home to the nation's only National Institutes of Health (NIH) Perinatology Research Branch.

== Clinical services ==
Hutzel Services include: High-Risk Pregnancy Care, Maternal-Fetal Medicine, Minimally Invasive Surgery, Incontinence/Urogynecology, Long-term Birth Control, Menopause and Bariatric (Weight Loss) Surgery

== Ranking ==
Hutzel Women's Hospital is listed in The Leapfrog Group's 2008 Top Hospital list for patient quality and safety. The Leapfrog Group rankings are based on a survey conducted at 1,220 hospitals across the country.

== Notable births ==
- Lizzo – Rapper
- Diana Ross – Singer
