= Huron Valley-Sinai Hospital =

Hospital in Commerce Township, Michigan, USA

Coordinates: 42°35′32.7″N 83°29′51.9″W

DMC Huron Valley-Sinai Hospital, in Commerce Township, Michigan, is one of the eight hospitals/institutes composing the Detroit Medical Center. Huron-Valley-Sinai contains the Harris Birthing Center, a regional specialty center, the Charach Cancer Treatment Center, (affiliated with the Barbara Ann Karmanos Cancer Center), the Krieger Center for Senior Adults, surgical suites, cardiac services, and comprehensive inpatient and outpatient diagnostic care.

== Clinical Services ==
Huron Valley-Sinai Hospital offers the following clinical services:

- Cardiac Services
- Emergency Medicine
- Endoscopy
- Imaging
- Obstetrics/Gynecology (Harris Birthing Center)
- Oncology (Charach Cancer Treatment Center)
- Orthopedics
- Pediatrics
- Rehabilitation Services
- Senior Services
- Surgical Services
- Women's Health (The Sinai Center for Women)

== Ranking and accreditation ==
Huron Valley-Sinai Hospital received the Distinguished Hospital for Clinical Excellence Award (2008) from HealthGrades.

Huron Valley is fully accredited by the Joint Commission on Accreditation of Healthcare Organizations (JCAHO). The Joint Commission assesses the quality of care and safety for more than 15,000 health care organizations. The Joint Commission conducts an extensive on-site review at least once every three years whose purpose is to evaluate the organization's performance in areas that affect patient care.
