= Sinai-Grace Hospital =

- Detroit Medical Center

Geography
- Location: 6071 West Outer Drive; Detroit, Michigan, Michigan, United States
- Coordinates: 42°25′N 83°11′W

Services
- Emergency department: Level II trauma center
- Beds: 334

History
- Founded: Grace – 1888; Sinai – 1953; Combined – 1999

Links
- Website: SinaiGrace.org
- Lists: Hospitals in Michigan

DMC Sinai-Grace Hospital is one of the eight hospitals that comprise the Detroit Medical Center (DMC). Located in northwest Detroit, Sinai-Grace provides health care services in over forty specialties and has 334 inpatient beds. The hospital has comprehensive cardiovascular, emergency/trauma, cancer, surgical, OBGYN, urological, gastrointestinal, intensive, and geriatrics services.

Sinai-Grace's Joint Excel Plus program features minimally invasive knee and hip replacement surgical services. In addition to its hospital-based care, Sinai-Grace operates more than 25 outpatient care sites and ambulatory surgery centers throughout Wayne and Oakland Counties. Sinai-Grace is one of 10 hospitals in the nation to be awarded a Robert Wood Johnson Foundation grant to set the standards of cardiac care for hospitals and physicians throughout the nation. U.S. News & World Report named Sinai-Grace Hospital as high-performing in stroke, COPD, and heart failure care in 2020.

More than 200 medical students and resident physicians in a variety of medical and surgical specialties get their advanced training at Sinai-Grace every year. In addition, nursing students, radiology technicians, pharmacists, physician assistants, pathologists' assistants, and chaplains train at the hospital.

== History ==
Grace Hospital was established in 1888 and named after Grace McMillan Jarvis, daughter of founder Senator James McMillan. It was located at the corner of Willis and John R. adjacent to the current main campus of the Detroit Medical Center. Grace Hospital opened a training school for nurses in 1889. In 1913, the Miriam Memorial Branch of the hospital opened at the former Vinewood Estate of Bela Hubbard on the north side of Lafayette between West Grand Blvd and Vinewood. It was demolished in 1933.

Sinai Hospital's roots date from a clinic opened by Harry Saltzstein, M.D., in 1922. Sinai Hospital opened its doors in January 1953 to give Jewish healthcare professionals a place to practice without discrimination and as a central institution for the Jewish community.

In April 1999, two hospitals with roots in the community since 1888 consolidated services under one roof. The former Sinai and Grace hospitals joined to create a community academic hospital in northwest Detroit and relocated to the former Mount Carmel Hospital building. Around April 1991, Grace Hospital had originally merged with Mount Carmel Hospital. The Grace and Mount Carmel hospital staff merged creating the new Grace Hospital at the 6071 West Outer Drive location.

== Clinical services ==
Clinical Services at DMC Sinai-Grace Hospital include:

- Audiology
- Cardiology
- Cosmetic/Plastic Surgery
- Critical Care
- Dermatology
- Diabetes
- Ear/Nose/Throat
- Emergency Medicine
- Endocrinology
- Gastroenterology
- Infectious Disease
- Nephrology
- Neurology
- Obstetrics
- Oncology/Hematology
- Ophthalmology
- Oral/Maxillofacial Surgery
- Orthopedics
- Pain Management
- Pediatrics
- Pharmacy
- Physical Medicine/Rehabilitation
- Podiatric Surgery
- Psychiatry
- Radiology
- Rheumatology
- Sleep Disorders
- Surgery
- Urology
- Vascular Services
- Women's Health

== Programs and services of note ==
DMC Sinai-Grace Hospital offers free health education programs during the fall and spring from the People's Medical College. A few of the classes offered were on:

- Joint Pain
- Allergies
- Fibroids and Menopause
- Diabetes wound care
- Stroke
- Heart Health

Sinai-Grace Hospital was the first hospital in Detroit and among the first in the region to have the Umbilical Cord Blood Bank program.

== Surgical milestones ==
Sinai-Grace Hospital was the first hospital in Michigan to offer blue light cystoscopies. The hospital was the first in the state to offer incision-free uterine fibroid surgery, as well.

== Accreditation ==
DMC Sinai-Grace Hospital has been recognized/accredited by several major organizations, including:

- Joint Commission on Accreditation of Healthcare Organizations (JCAHO) – Fully Accredited, 2014.
- MPRO/Michigan Medicare Quality Improvement Organization – Governor's Award.
- The Leapfrog Group – Top Hospital list for patient quality and safety 2012, 2013, 2014.
- U.S. News & World Report – America's Top Hospitals
- Centers for Medicare and Medicaid Services (CMS) and the Federal Department of Health and Human Services ranked above the national average in care for patients with specific types of medical conditions including heart failure and heart attacks.
- HealthGrades’ Stroke Care Excellence Award, Critical Care Award.
