= Detroit Medical Center =

Hospital alliance in Michigan, United States

Coordinates: 42°21′17.9″N 83°3′23.4″W

Detroit Medical Center logo

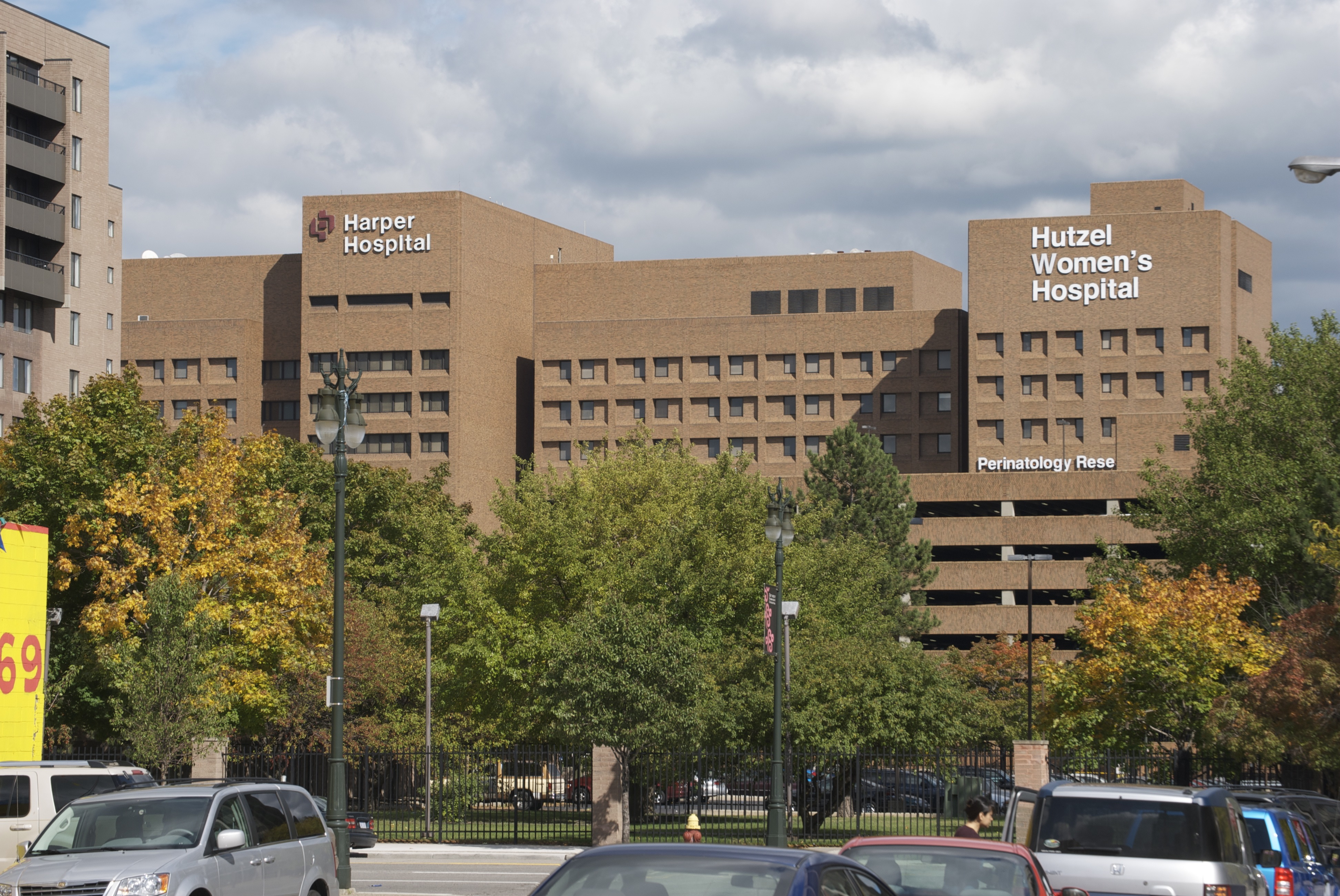
Harper Hospital and Hutzel Women's Hospital are part of the Detroit Medical Center

The Detroit Medical Center (DMC) is a for-profit alliance of hospitals that encompasses over 2,000 licensed beds, 3,000 affiliated physicians, and over 12,000 employees. Located in Midtown Detroit, the DMC is affiliated with medical schools from Wayne State University and Michigan State University. Detroit Medical Center hospitals are staffed by physicians from the Michigan State University College of Osteopathic Medicine and the Wayne State University School of Medicine, the largest single-campus medical school in the United States and the nation's fourth largest medical school overall. The Detroit Medical Center is fully accredited by the Joint Commission on Accreditation of Healthcare Organizations.

The Detroit Medical Center is the official healthcare services provider for the Detroit Tigers and the Detroit Red Wings.

On March 19, 2010, Vanguard Health Systems and Detroit Medical Center announced an $850 million expansion and renovation plan. Detroit Medical Center formally became a part of Vanguard Health Systems on December 30, 2010, as a for-profit corporation. Vanguard agreed to invest nearly $1.5 billion which included $417 million to retire debts, at least $350 million in capital expenditures and an additional $500 million for new capital investment in Detroit Medical Center. Vanguard has agreed to assume all debts and pension obligations. In June 2013, rival Tenet Healthcare announced it would purchase Vanguard for $1.73 billion. The transaction closed October 3, 2013.

== History ==
The Detroit Medical Center was organized in 1985 as an affiliation among several hospitals: Harper University Hospital, Grace Hospital, Hutzel Women's Hospital, and Children's Hospital of Michigan. With the addition of other hospitals, such as Detroit Receiving Hospital, the campus of the DMC and its adjacent partner institutions (the Karmanos Cancer Institute and the John D. Dingell VA Medical Center) now occupies most of the area bounded Mack Avenue on the south, Warren Avenue on the north, John R. on the west, and Beaubien on the east.

Harper Hospital was founded in 1863, receiving its first patients, Civil War soldiers, in 1864. Two years later it opened as a general hospital. In 1882, a new hospital building was constructed on what is now the campus of the DMC. Additional buildings were constructed in 1913 and 1928. Hutzel Women's Hospital, was founded in 1868. Grace Hospital was founded in 1883, and Children's Hospital was founded three years later. Detroit Receiving was founded in 1915, and moved to its present location in 1980.

== Organization ==
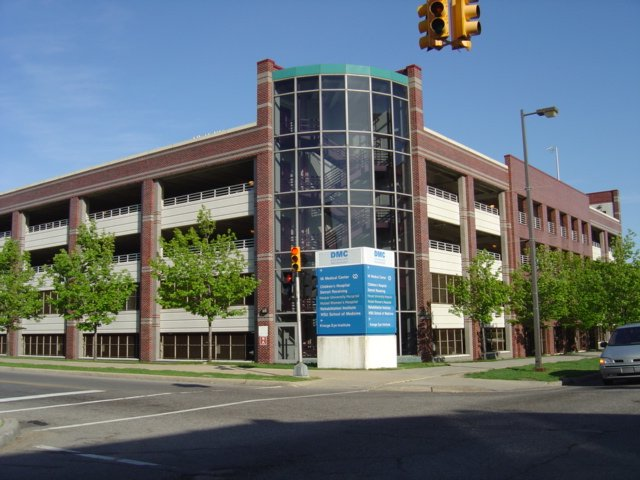
One of the employee parking garages at the Detroit Medical Center

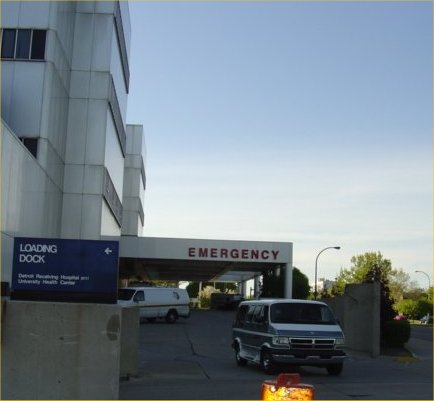
Emergency entrance to Detroit Receiving Hospital

The Detroit Medical Center is a part of Tenet Healthcare, a major health care provider. The Detroit Medical Center operates eight general and specialty hospitals in southeast Michigan. Detroit Medical Center hospitals include:

- DMC Children's Hospital of Michigan (Pediatric Level I trauma center)
- DMC Detroit Receiving Hospital (Michigan's first Level I Trauma Center and first emergency medicine training program)
- DMC Harper University Hospital (with specialty services including bariatric surgery, cardiology, vascular procedures, neurosurgery, neurology and kidney and pancreas organ transplants)
- DMC Heart Hospital and Harper Specialty Center (Open August 2014)
- DMC Hutzel Women's Hospital (obstetrics, infertility and gynecology)
- DMC Surgery Hospital (surgical services)
- DMC Rehabilitation Institute of Michigan (rehabilitation medicine and spinal cord injuries)

The DMC system also includes three hospitals separate from the main Medical Center complex:

- DMC Sinai-Grace Hospital, in northwest Detroit
- DMC Huron Valley-Sinai Hospital, in the suburb of Commerce Township
- DMC Children's Hospital of Michigan-Troy, in the suburb of Troy (opened 2016)

Partnerships

- Kresge Eye Institute is part of Wayne State University that offers ophthalmology and cornea transplantation services.

== Corporate governance ==
Former Wayne County Prosecutor Mike Duggan was president and chief executive officer from January 2004 through December 2012 when he left to mount a campaign to become mayor of Detroit. Joseph Mullany succeeded Duggan as CEO.

== Recognition ==
Two of the Detroit Medical Center hospitals ranked in the top one percent in heart failure outcomes in the U.S. DMC Harper University Hospital and DMC Sinai-Grace Hospital ranked above the national average in a survey compiled by the Centers for Medicare and Medicaid Services (CMS) and the Department of Health and Human Services. The list included data from 4,807 hospitals across the United States. Of those hospitals, only 38 were ranked above the national average. The results are meant to assist the public in assessing how well their area hospitals care for patients with specific types of medical conditions including heart failure and heart attacks. The Detroit Medical Center is the only health system in the state of Michigan with two hospitals ranked at this level.

The Detroit Medical Center was named to the list of the nation's 100 Most Wired Hospitals and Health Systems in July 2007. The list is the result of the Most Wired Survey and Benchmarking Study conducted since 1999 by the American Hospital Association and published in the July 2007 issue of Hospitals & Health Networks Magazine. The survey focuses on how hospitals use information technologies for quality, customer service, public health and safety, business processes and workforce issues.

The hospitals in the "Top 100" show superior outcomes in four key areas: mortality rate, patient safety measures from the Agency for Healthcare Research and Quality (AHRQ), core measures from Hospital Compare and average length of stay. Based on analysis of the ninth annual Most Wired Survey and Benchmarking Study results, hospitals are embracing technology as a key tool for healthcare quality improvements.

The Detroit Medical Center received the prestigious "Best Practices in Infrastructure Management" award in 2006. The award is given annually by Computerworld’s Infrastructure Management World, the premier conference for leaders in the data center and infrastructure Management sector. The award recognizes DMC's leadership and excellence among users of infrastructure management technology across the nation. The DMC was one of only two organizations bestowed the annual award that year.

Harper University Hospital ranked as one of the top 30 hospitals in the country for Neurology and Neurosurgery by U.S. News & World Report. Children's Hospital of Michigan was ranked one of the top 30 hospitals in the country for children by the same publication.
