= Henry Ford Hospital =

Detroit tertiary-care hospital

Coordinates: 42°22′1.3″N 83°5′3.5″W

- Henry Ford Health System

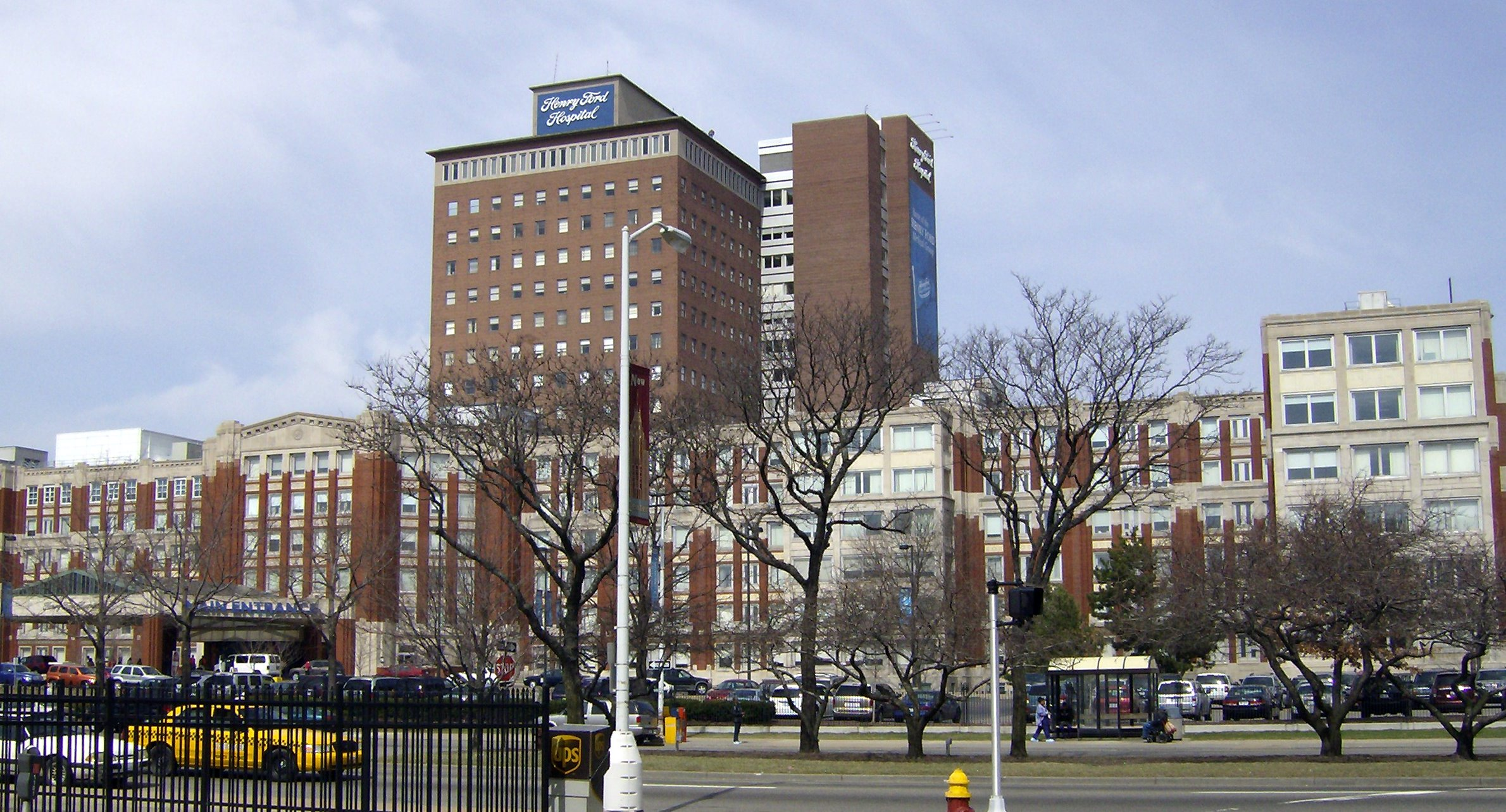
- Henry Ford Hospital in 2008

Geography
- Location: 2799 West Grand Boulevard; Detroit, Michigan 48202, Wayne County, Michigan, United States

Organization
- Care system: Full medical care, including inpatient and outpatient care
- Type: Academic medical center and hospital
- Affiliated university: Wayne State University

Services
- Emergency department: Level I Trauma Center
- Beds: 877

Helipads
- Helipad: FAA LID: 0MI9

History
- Founded: 1915

Links
- Website: www.henryford.com/locations/henry-ford-hospital
- Lists: Hospitals in Michigan
- Other links
- Henry Ford Hospital
- U.S. National Register of Historic Places
- Area: 34 acres (14 ha)
- Built: 1915
- Built by: Albert A. Albrecht
- Architect: William Stratton, Albert Wood, Benjamin L. Smith, Albert Kahn Associates
- Architectural style: Georgian Revival
- NRHP reference No.: 13000671
- Added to NRHP: September 4, 2013

Henry Ford Hospital (HFH) is an 877-bed tertiary care hospital, education and research complex at the western edge of the New Center area in Detroit, Michigan. The flagship facility for Henry Ford Health, it was one of the first hospitals in the United States to use a standard fee schedule and favor private or semi-private rooms over large wards. It was the first hospital in the country to form a closed, salaried medical staff. As founder Henry Ford viewed tobacco as being unhealthy, the hospital was one of the first in the United States to institute a total ban on smoking. Henry Ford Hospital is staffed by the Henry Ford Medical Group, one of the nation's largest and oldest group practices with 1,200 physicians in more than 40 specialties.

Henry Ford Hospital, which opened in 1915, is a Level 1 trauma center, recognized for clinical excellence and innovations in the fields of cardiology, cardiovascular surgery, neurology, neurosurgery, orthopedics, sports medicine, organ transplants, and treatment for prostate, breast, and lung cancers. Henry Ford Hospital annually trains more than 500 residents and 125 fellows in 46 accredited programs. Through its affiliation with Wayne State University, more than 400 medical students train at the hospital each academic year. The Detroit hospital and campus is led by executive vice president and CEO Steven Kalkanis.

== Overview ==
Henry Ford Hospital is an 877-bed hospital located in Detroit's New Center area. The hospital is staffed by the 1,200 physicians and scientists in the Henry Ford Medical Group. The model for the Henry Ford Medical Group is the same model used at the Mayo Clinic, Johns Hopkins Hospital and the Cleveland Clinic. Henry Ford Hospital operates a Level 1 Trauma Center and has one of the busiest emergency rooms in Michigan, treating nearly 100,000 patients annually.

Henry Ford Hospital performs organ transplants in many areas, including heart, lung, kidney, bone marrow, pancreas, and liver. Henry Ford Hospital's Vattikuti Urology Institute operates the largest robotic prostatectomy program in the world. The robotic prostate surgery was created at Henry Ford and more than 5,000 men have had successful robotic prostate surgery.

In 2009, Henry Ford Hospital opened 24 new private intensive care rooms, bringing its total to 156 intensive care rooms at the Detroit campus, more than any other hospital in Michigan. The opening of the new floor is the final piece of a two-story, $35 million addition at the hospital.

Henry Ford has a medical education program, where more than 500 residents in 40 specialties train every day. One-third of all physicians in Michigan receive training at Henry Ford, and its post-graduate medical education enterprise is among the largest in the country.

Research programs at Henry Ford Hospital have total annual funding exceeding $70 million. The National Institutes of Health is the primary funding source for Henry Ford's research programs. Henry Ford physicians and researchers are currently involved in more than 1,700 research projects, including those focused on stroke and traumatic brain injury, hypertension and heart disease, cancer, bone and joint diseases, the immunological basis of disease, and population studies of allergy, asthma and cancer prevention.

Much of Henry Ford Hospital research is translational in nature - from bench to bedside. To this end, basic science studies run the gamut from whole animal physiology to cell and molecular biology to bioengineering with an emphasis on studies that can directly impact patient care. In 2009, Henry Ford researchers published more than 450 articles in peer-reviewed medical journals and attracted $57.4 million in external funding.

Henry Ford Hospital is part of Henry Ford Health, one of the country's largest health care systems and a national leader in clinical care, research and education. It includes the 1,200-member Henry Ford Medical Group, thirteen hospitals, the Health Alliance Plan, 30 primary care centers and many other health-related entities throughout Southeast Michigan.

In 2009 alone, Henry Ford provided more than $173 million in uncompensated care. The health system plans to invest $500 million to expand the Henry Ford Hospital in Detroit, and employs more than 23,000.

Founded in 1915 by auto pioneer Henry Ford and now one of the nation's leading health care providers, Henry Ford Health is a not-for-profit corporation managed by chief executive officer Wright L. Lassiter, III and governed by a 17-member Board of Trustees, with volunteer-led advisory and affiliate boards providing additional leadership.

The system is governed by a board of trustees. Advisory and affiliate boards include 150 volunteer leaders, who provide vital links to the communities served by the System. Henry Ford is managed by President and chief executive officer Wright Lassiter, III.

More than 30,000 total Henry Ford Health employees provide care during the more than 4.24 million annual patient contacts. Henry Ford health care providers perform more than 100,400 ambulatory surgery procedures each year. More than 113,000 patients are admitted to Henry Ford's thirteen hospitals annually.

For the 15th consecutive year, the System experienced positive revenue growth in 2017. The System is one of a handful of healthcare organizations nationally with both a strong provider organization and large insurance operations. Overall revenue was 6.0 billion in 2017, an increase of 4.8%.

== History ==
=== 1910s ===
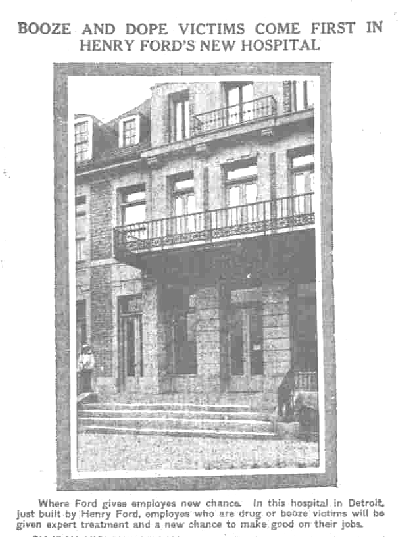
Newspaper photo of the hospital from 1915.

In 1909, responding to the lack of hospital beds in the city, William Metcalf organized the Detroit General Hospital Association. The Association included a number of prominent Detroit citizens, among whom was Henry Ford. The Association used donations from its members to purchase a site at Grand Boulevard and Hamilton, and to hire architect William Stratton to design the hospital. Construction on the original seven buildings began in 1912, but the Association soon realized that its $600,000 budget was far too small to complete the hospital. However, in 1914, Henry Ford offered to complete the project and pay off the original donors, in exchange for complete control. The Association accepted, and construction continued.

The original seven buildings—a service building, power house, garage, private patient building, surgical pavilion, and two other small buildings—were completed by 1915, and Henry Ford Hospital opened its doors to patients on October 1. Henry Ford organized a closed staff of physicians and surgeons, many of whom came from Johns Hopkins, including medical chief Frank J. Sladen and surgical chief Roy Donaldson McClure.

In 1917, it was determined that more space was needed for the hospital, and Ford Motor Company architect Albert Wood was hired to design a new hospital. Contractor Albert A. Albrecht was hired to construct the new hospital, but World War I intervened before construction was complete. In 1918, Ford loaned the semi-completed building to the US government, and it was used as U.S. Army General Hospital Number 36 until late 1919. Construction was completed after the war, in 1921.

=== 1920s ===
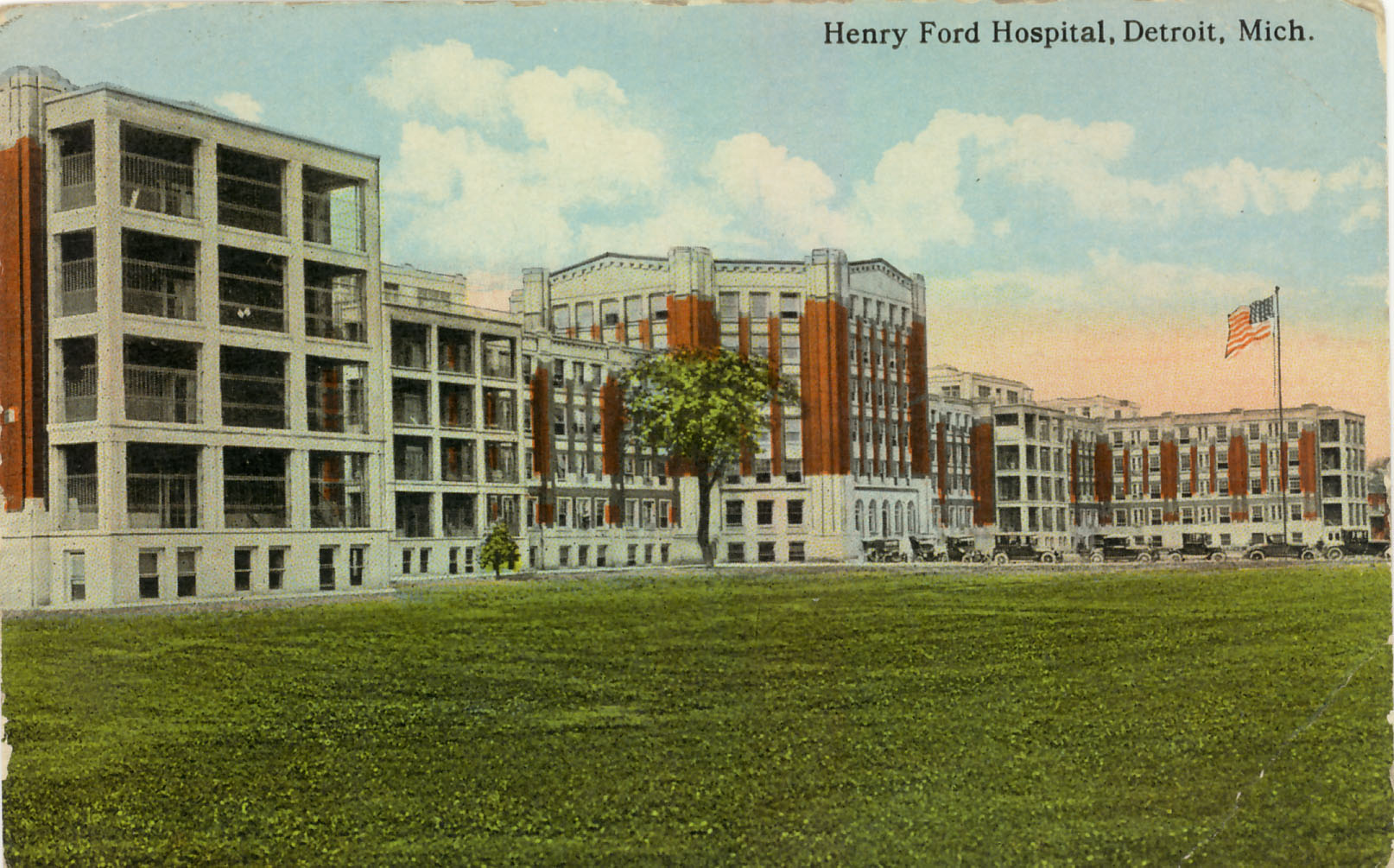
Henry Ford Hospital in 1920

In 1923, under the direction of Thomas J. Heldt, Henry Ford Hospital became one of the first American general hospitals to establish a psychiatric unit. In 1935, Roy McClure began adding iodine to kitchen salt to prevent the development of endemic goiters. Eventually salt for human use was iodized by law.

=== 1930s ===
In 1931, while at Henry Ford Hospital, A. Robert Bauer's efforts in incubator development led to the successful combination of oxygen, heat, humidity, ease of accessibility, and ease of nursing care into a single apparatus.

=== 1940s ===
In 1940, Conrad Lam was the first physician in the United States to administer purified heparin to treat clotting of veins. In 1942, Henry Ford Hospital became one of a few U.S. hospitals selected by the National Research Council as a trial site to test penicillin. In 1943, Henry Ford Hospital's Frank Hartman developed the liquid oxygen tent. In 1944, Henry Ford Hospital became the first hospital to use the now-routine technique of multiple lead electrocardiograms.

In 1948, the hospital recognized the need for a new building due to the 600% increase in patients over the preceding 25 years and hired Benjamin L. Smith of the New York firm Vorhees, Walker, Foley and Smith to design a new clinic tower, construction of which began in 1951.

=== 1950s ===
The new clinic building opened in 1953 however construction returned to the campus in 1957 when Albert Kahn Associates designed an addition of two floors for the main building.

In 1951, Conrad Lam and Edward Munnell developed a technique for the correction of mitral valve stenosis, using a special six-finger glove with a knife attached to the sixth mid-palm finger. In 1952, Henry Ford Hospital vascular surgeon, D. Emerick Szilagyi, performed one of the world's first grafts of an abdominal aortic aneurysm. In 1956, Henry Ford Hospital cardiothoracic surgeon Conrad Lam performed the first successful open heart surgery in Michigan using the heart-lung machine on 15 month old Kathleen McQuillen. That same year, Henry Ford's James Barron developed the Barron Food Pump, a device used to deliver pureed food through a small nasal gastric tube.

=== 1960s ===
In 1967, George Mikhail performed Detroit's first Mohs Micrographic Surgery, a procedure to remove skin cancers. In 1968, the first allogenic kidney transplant in Detroit was done by D. Emerick Szilagyi, Joseph P. Elliott and Roger F. Smith.

=== 1970s ===
In 1973, Michigan's first renal transplant to a diabetic patient was performed by Stanley Dienst. In 1979, Henry Ford Hospital was one of the first to perform coronary angioplasty.

=== 1980s ===
In 1980, Fred W. Whitehouse and Dorothy A. Kahkonen were the first physicians in Michigan and the second in the country to administer human insulin to a patient with diabetes. In 1985, Fraser Keith and Donald Magilligan performed Detroit's first heart transplant. In the same year, the first extracorporal shock wave lithotripsy in Michigan was performed at Henry Ford. This non-invasive procedure breaks kidney stones into sand-like grains which are easily passed from the body. In 1987, Charles Jackson and other Henry Ford Hospital and Yale researchers identified the location of a gene on chromosome 10, linked to hereditary medullary thyroid cancer. In 1993, the gene itself was identified. Also in 1987, Henry Ford Hospital was the first in Michigan to use iodine radium implant seeds to combat cancerous cells in the prostate. In 1988, Detroit's first liver transplant was performed at Henry Ford Hospital.

=== 1990s ===
In 1994, Henry Ford Hospital performed the first lung transplant in the Detroit Metropolitan Area, making it the only facility in metro Detroit to perform all solid organ transplants. In 1995, Henry Ford Hospital conducted Michigan's first radiosurgery treatment for patients with inoperable tumors using the three-dimensional x-knife system. In 1996, Henry Ford Hospital performed the state's first split-liver transplant, during which a donor's liver was split in two and the separate pieces transplanted into two patients. In 1998, Henry Ford Hospital became the first hospital in Michigan to offer genetic testing for breast cancer.

=== 2000s ===
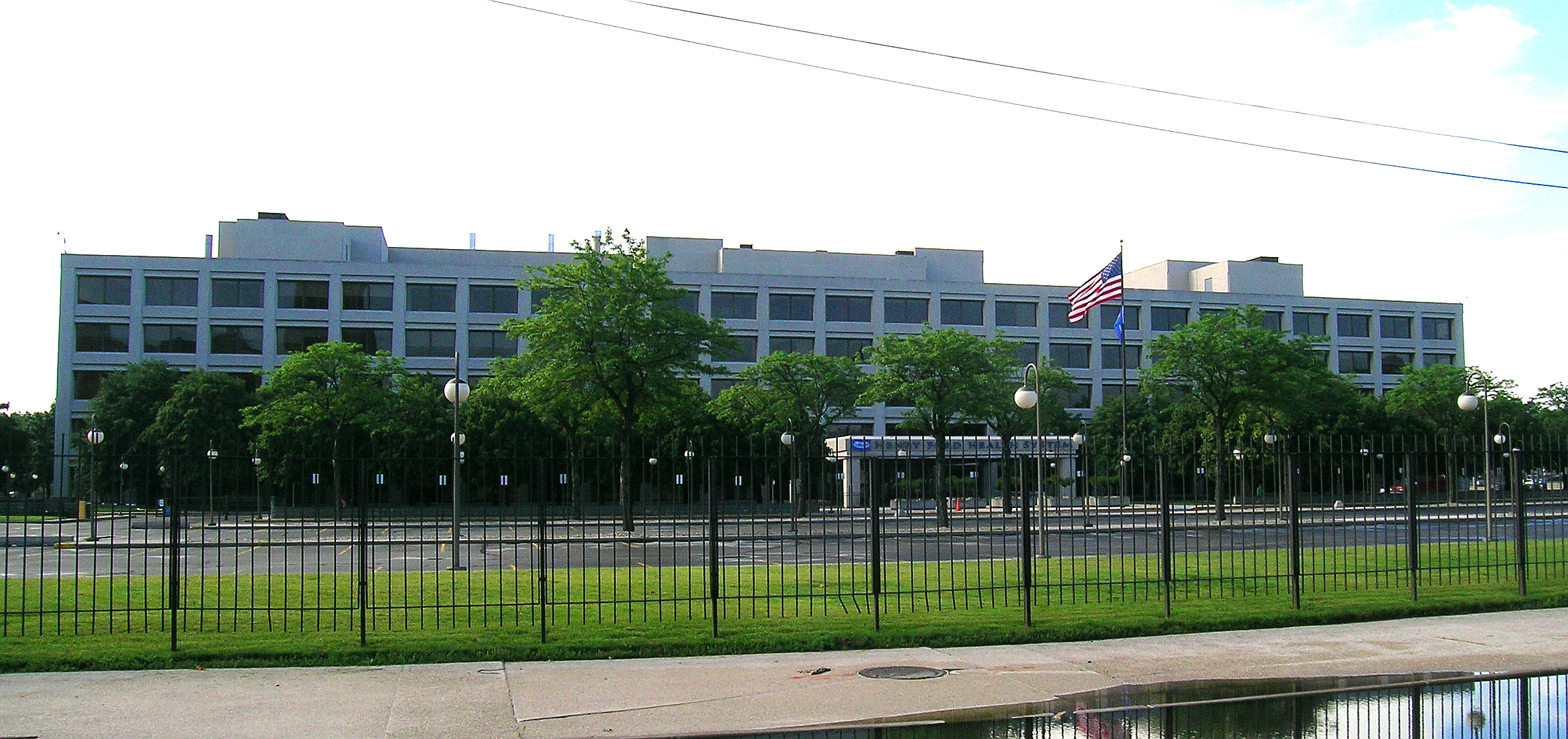
The headquarters of the Henry Ford Health System, in June 2008

In 2000, Henry Ford Hospital performed Michigan's first adult-to-adult, living donor liver transplant. In 2001, the Vattikuti Urology Institute, under the direction of Mani Menon, was the first in the United States to perform surgery using a robotic system for the treatment of prostate cancer. Also in 2001, doctors at Henry Ford Hospital became the first in Michigan to use gene therapy for the treatment of brain tumors. In 2005, Scott Dulchavsky, chair of the department of Surgery at Henry Ford Hospital, expanded uses for ultrasound technology for physicians and non-medical personnel; these procedures can be used as an accurate diagnostic tool when coupled with the Internet, a telephone or wireless transmission of ultrasound images to experts from a patient in rural areas or in space. Also in 2005, Henry Ford Medical Group began using e-prescribing to cut prescription costs and improve quality. In 2008, Henry Ford Hospital became the first hospital in southeastern Michigan to perform a new, minimally invasive procedure for back pain that spares the nerves from being nicked and back muscles from being cut. In 2009, Henry Ford Hospital received more than $70 million in research funding.

=== 2010s ===
In 2010, Henry Ford Hospital performed Michigan's first intestine transplant. The composite multivisceral transplant procedure included transplant of the patient's small bowel, stomach, and pancreas.

=== 2020s ===
Researchers at Henry Ford Health report that patients with chronic hepatitis C who are treated with direct-acting antiviral medications are less likely to be hospitalized for liver and non-liver related health issues.

== Campus and buildings ==
Henry Ford Hospital sits on a 34-acre (14 ha) campus at the western edge of the New Center area. The main hospital is at the southern boundary of the campus, facing Grand Boulevard, with additions to the north and west. The remainder of the buildings are located north of the main hospital. The campus includes multiple buildings constructed at different times and designed by different architects in different architectural styles. However, the buildings relate to each other, as most use similarly colored brick and similar trim features.

=== M Unit (1914) ===
The M Unit is the original patient building and is located directly east of the clinic tower, slightly below the current grade. The building is a 2 1/2-story red brick structure with limestone trim and a red clay tile roof. The architecture is similar to a Georgian estate house, with a nine-bay-wide center mass flanked by symmetrical three-bay wings. The entrance is in the center, with the entrance bay and the surrounding two bays clad in limestone.

=== Main Hospital (1917; 1957 addition) ===
The main hospital is a six-story brick building, with a large central octagonal tower flanked by symmetrical wings. The wings end in perpendicular pavilions, giving the entire structure an H-footprint. The front of the tower is five bays wide, with angled sides three bays wide. Each bay contains a single window at the third through sixth floors.

The fifth and sixth floors of the wings were added in 1957, but match the original building in appearance. Each wing has nine bays, with the center three being a stone-clad porch (now filled with aluminum windows). The end pavilions extend nine bays perpendicularly.

=== Clara Ford Nurse's Home (1925) ===
The Clara Ford Nurse's Home is a 6 1/2-story red brick Georgian Revival structure with a clay tile roof. The building extends for an entire block, with perpendicular sections at each end extending to the rear to give the building a U-shaped footprint. The foundation and first floor are clad in limestone, and the center double-door entrance is reached by a large set of steps. The entire building uses one-over-one symmetric-paired double-hung windows.

=== Education Building (1925) ===
The Education Building is located near the Clara Ford Nurse's Home, and is built in a similar Georgian Revival style.

=== Clinic Tower (1951) ===
The clinic tower is a 17-story rectangular red brick building, extending 11 by 17 bays of evenly spaced windows from the second through sixteenth floors. The seventeenth floor has narrower windows spaced more closely and is faced in the exterior in limestone. The exterior has little detail. On the roof is a two-story penthouse, also faced in limestone, which houses mechanical and ventilation equipment. In 1971, the hospital added a tower to the east of the clinic to house additional elevators, stairways and office space. The exterior of the tower is faced with red brick and metal panels.

=== South Parking Deck (1959) ===
The south parking deck is faced with distinctive twisted concrete slabs on the upper four levels, with the twist alternating in direction from floor to floor. The first floor is clad in red brick, and two red brick stair towers are located on the south and west sides.

=== Other buildings ===
Other buildings on the campus include the 1965 north parking deck (similar in appearance to the south deck), the 1975 apartment building, the 1974 Benson Ford Education and Research Center, the 1978 Eleanor Clay Ford Pavilion, the 1978 Power House, and the 1997 West Pavilion.

In 2017, the Henry Ford Health announced the start of a second development on its evolving 300-acre South Campus site in New Center, with the construction of a new $150 million, 187,000-square-foot, six-story, Brigitte Harris Cancer Pavilion, scheduled to open in early 2020, along with a skywalk across West Grand Boulevard to connect it to the hospital.

In 2017, Henry Ford Health and the Detroit Pistons announced plans to build a new $65 million, Henry Ford-Detroit Pistons Performance Center, that includes a dedicated 25,000-square-foot sports medicine building, that will also be available to the public, and that will be connected to the performance center. It will be located in the TechTown area of New Center.

== Partnerships ==
Henry Ford Health has partnered with for-profit behavioral health system Acadia Healthcare to operate some of its facilities.

== Awards and recognition ==
In 2011, Henry Ford Health was one of four recipients of the Malcolm Baldrige National Quality Award, presented by the president of the United States. In the same year, the hospital was selected by the National Quality Forum and The Joint Commission to receive the John M. Eisenberg Patient Safety and Quality Award. The No Harm Campaign was recognized for successfully reducing harm events by 26% and system-wide mortality by 12% from 2008 to 2011.

Additionally, Henry Ford Hospital received the 2010 American Hospital Association-McKesson Quest for Quality finalist award. The prize honors hospitals that have committed in a systematic manner to achieving the Institute of Medicine's six quality aims—safety, patient-centeredness, effectiveness, efficiency, timeliness, and equity.

== Notable staff ==
- Rana L. Awdish (born 1974) - Pulmonary and Critical Care Medicine Physician and noted author
- Emanuel Rivers - noted sepsis researcher

== See also ==
- Henry Ford Hospital (1932 painting by Frida Kahlo)
