= Children's Hospital of Michigan =

- Detroit Medical Center

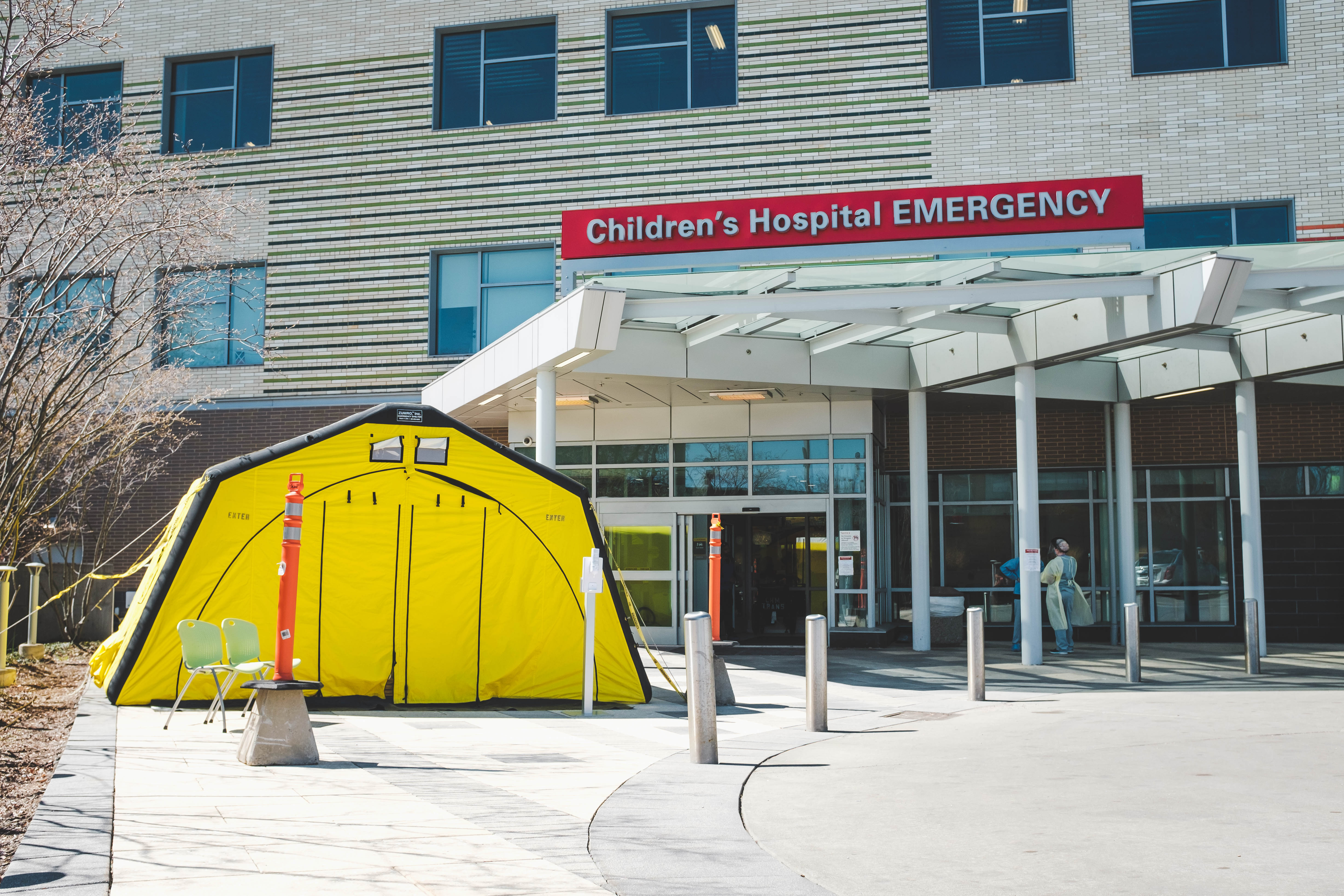
- Emergency Room entrance.

Geography
- Location: Detroit, Michigan, United States
- Coordinates: 42.35174°N 83.05471°W

Organization
- Type: Specialist

Services
- Emergency department: Level 1 Pediatric Trauma Center
- Beds: 227
- Speciality: Pediatric

History
- Founded: 1886

Links
- Website: www.childrensdmc.org
- Lists: Hospitals in Michigan

Children's Hospital of Michigan (CHM) is a for-profit, pediatric acute care hospital located in Detroit, Michigan. The hospital has 227 beds and is affiliated with Central Michigan University College of Medicine, Wayne State University School of Medicine, and Michigan State University College of Osteopathic Medicine. The hospital provides comprehensive pediatric specialties and subspecialties to pediatric patients aged 0–21 throughout eastern Michigan and the Detroit area and is a part of the Detroit Medical Center. The hospital features the only freestanding pediatric Level 1 Pediatric Trauma Center in the Detroit region, 1 of 3 in the state. It is an international provider of pediatric neurology, neurosurgery, cardiology, oncology and diagnostic services including positron emission tomography and MRI.

== History ==
Children's Hospital of Michigan was founded in 1886 with a financial gift from whisky entrepreneur Hiram Walker. It was further endowed in the 1930s with a one million dollar gift from U.S. Senator James Couzens.

== Clinical specialties ==
The hospital offers a wide variety of clinical specialties, including: Autism, Burn Care, Cardiac Services, Cleft Palate/ Craniofacial Surgery, Communication Disorders, Critical Care, Dentistry/Oral Surgery, Dermatology, Ear, Nose and Throat, Emergency Care, Endocrinology, Gastroenterology, Genetic Disorders, Hematology and Oncology, Imaging Services, Immunology, Rheumatology and Allergy, Infectious Disease, Intensive Care, Myelomeningocele Care, Neonatal/ Perinatal Medicine, Nephrology, Neurology, Neurosurgery, Ophthalmology, Orthopedics, Pediatric Surgery, Pharmacology/ Toxicology, Physical Medicine/ Rehabilitation, Reconstructive Surgery, Poison Control Center, Psychiatry/Psychology and Pulmonary Medicine.

Children's is one of 10 centers nationally testing new drugs to treat spinal muscular atrophy, a rare degenerative problem that affects the spinal cord and nerves, resulting in muscle wasting and weakness. It houses the first pediatric cardiac catheterization laboratory of its kind in North America. Doctors at Children's Hospital performed the first successful advanced computer-assisted robot-enhanced surgical procedure at a children's hospital in the U.S. CHM cardiovascular surgeons performed the first pediatric heart transplant in Southeast Michigan. CHM is the only pediatric institution in the world with its own Positron Emission Tomography (PET) Center. Positron Emission Tomography is a type of nuclear medicine procedure that measures metabolic activity of the cells of body tissues. Children's Hospital performed the first successful pediatric bone marrow transplant in Michigan.

== Controversy ==
In late 2019, the physician group, University Pediatrics announced that they were separating from the Wayne State University School of Medicine and instead joining the Central Michigan University. In retaliation, Wayne State announced that they were creating their own physician group, Wayne Pediatrics and gave doctors who taught medicine at the university 30 days to switch over their affiliation to Wayne Pediatrics or lose their teaching privileges. The group University Pediatrics has had an exclusive contract with the Detroit Medical Center and DMC's owner, Tenet Healthcare decided that doctors from Wayne Pediatrics would lose their affiliation with the hospital and doctors with Wayne Pediatrics would not be able to treat or admit patients at the hospital. In April, 2020 Wayne State officials announced that they were taking up legal action against Tenet Healthcare. The judge later sided with Tenet' ability to control what physicians practice at their hospitals, and subsequent appeals by Wayne State failed. In November 2020, DMC C.E.O. sent out letters to Wayne State pediatricians informing them that they no longer had admitting privileges at the Children's Hospital of Michigan, but these pediatricians would be allowed to practice at DMC's adult hospitals.

== Awards ==
Children's Hospital of Michigan in, 2008 received, American Nurses Credentialing Center (ANCC) MAGNET Recognition designated for nursing excellence. Children's Hospital is the only children's hospital in Michigan with this award.

Children's is in the Leapfrog Group's 2008 Top Hospital list for patient quality and safety. The Leapfrog Group rankings are based on a survey conducted at 1,220 hospitals across the U.S.

As of the 2025-26 rankings, Children's Hospital of Michigan placed nationally in 1 pediatric specialty on U.S. News & World Report. The hospital was also ranked as #3 children's hospital in Michigan.

U.S. News & World Report Rankings for Children's Hospital of Michigan
Specialty	Rank (In the U.S.)	Score (Out of 100)
Pediatric Gastroenterology & GI Surgery	#46	62.6
