= Mayo Clinic Proceedings =

- Discipline: Internal medicine
- Language: English
- Edited by: Lisa K. Muenkel

Publication details
- Former name(s): Proceedings of the Staff Meetings of the Mayo Clinic
- History: 1926–present
- Publisher: Elsevier on behalf of the Mayo Clinic (United States)
- Frequency: Monthly
- Impact factor: 8.9 (2022)

Standard abbreviations
- ISO 4: Mayo Clin. Proc.

Indexing
- CODEN: MACPAJ
- ISSN: 0025-6196 (print); 1942-5546 (web)
- LCCN: sc78001722
- OCLC no.: 00822709

Links
- Journal homepage; Online access; Online archive

Mayo Clinic Proceedings is a monthly peer-reviewed medical journal published by Elsevier and sponsored by the Mayo Clinic. It covers the field of general internal medicine. The journal was established in 1926 as the Proceedings of the Staff Meetings of the Mayo Clinic and obtained its current name in 1964. The journal started online publishing in 1999. Initially, its website consisted of simple lists of tables of content. In 2012, the current website was established. In addition to the journal content, it contains extra features such as Medical Images, Residents Clinics, Art at Mayo, and Stamp Vignettes on Medical Science, as well as author interviews and monthly issue summaries. Readers can also obtain CME credit. According to the Journal Citation Reports, the journal has a 2022 impact factor of 8.9.

== Types of articles published ==
The journal publishes the following types of articles:

- Original Article
- Review Article
- Solicited Review
- Concise Review for Clinicians (continuing medical education – CME – credit is offered with the Concise Review for Clinicians section)
- My Treatment Approach
- Diagnosis and Treatment Guidelines
- Special Article
- Commentary
- Brief Report
- Editorial
- Letter to the Editor
- Medical Images
- Stamp / Historical Vignettes
- Art at Mayo
- Meeting Reports
- Symposium (continuing medical education – CME – credit is offered with the Symposium collections)
- Case Report
- Residents' Clinic
- Path-to-Patient image quiz

== Editors ==
The following persons are or have been editors-in-chief of the journal:

- E. D. Bayrd (1964–1970)
- A. B. Hayles (1971–1976)
- J. L. Juergens (1977–1981)
- R. G. Siekert (1982–1986)
- P. J. Palumbo (1987–1993)
- Udaya B. S. Prakash (1994–1998)
- William L. Lanier (1999–present)
