= American Base Hospital No. 5 =

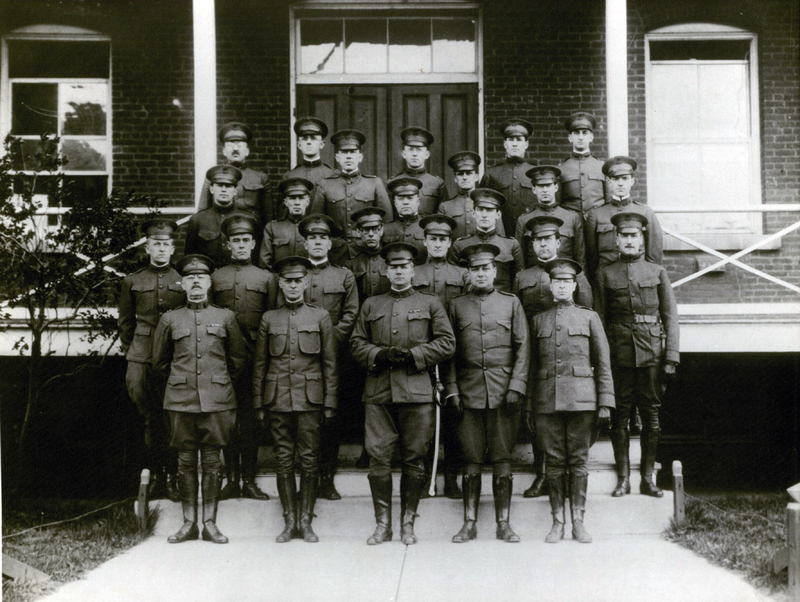
- The Officers of U.S.A. Base Hospital No. 5 (Harvard Medical School Unit), taken at Fort Totten, N.Y., May 10, 1917

Geography
- Location: Châtel-Guyon, France

Organisation
- Care system: Government
- Type: Military

Services
- Beds: 650

History
- Founded: 1916

Links
- Lists: Hospitals in France

Base Hospital No. 5 was organized by Harvard Medical School and was one of six American Expeditionary Forces (AEF) Base Hospitals loaned to the British Expeditionary Forces (BEF) during the First World War. The personnel started in Camiers at General Hospital No. 11 in June 1917 and then moved to General Hospital No. 13, at Boulogne-sur-Mer to finish out the war.

== In The United States ==
Many Americans began preparing for the entry into the First World War prior to the country's formal engagement in hostilities, notably in the formation of hospitals under the auspices of the Red Cross. On February 18, 1916, Col. Jefferson Randolph Kean of the United States Army Medical Corps was detailed to the American Red Cross to organized field hospital units. On February 22, 1916, he visited Boston and proposed that three hospitals be organized around the three major hospitals of the city: Massachusetts General Hospital, Boston City Hospital, and Brigham Hospital (now Brigham and Women's Hospital). Harvard University, however had already begun making plans for a unit of its own, and a compromise was reached where Harvard Medical School and all its affiliated hospitals would form a unit instead of Brigham alone. Dr. Harvey Cushing was chosen to direct the unit and its membership came from Harvard's Medical and Dental Schools as well as Brigham Hospital, Boston Children's Hospital, Massachusetts Eye and Ear Infirmary, Massachusetts General Hospital, and Boston City Hospital. Due to the large number of doctors and nurses from Brigham Hospital, Base Hospital No. 5 was sometimes inaccurately referred to as the Brigham Unit. The unit was occasionally confused with the Harvard Surgical Unit, which was formed in 1915 and operated General Hospital No. 22 of the Royal Army Medical Corps.

Col. Jacob Peabody of the local Red Cross chapter began a campaign to raise the $25,000 ($ 740,000 in 2025) worth of equipment required for a 500-bed hospital. A large part of the supply requirements were met through the New England Surgical Dressings Committee. The Committee organized dressings which were then sterilized and packed into sealed tins to be distributed in France through the American Clearing House. While the funds were raised and supplies and equipment purchased, they were not shipped with the hospital when it went overseas, believing materials would be in abundance there, instead, these supplies would be sent to help care for the victims of the Halifax Explosion.

While many were eager, it was difficult to secure all the personnel for the hospital before war was declared. Once the United States’ position was clear many hurried to join, because medical service would be the quickest way to France.

Base Hospital No.5 was organized in February 1916 and mobilized in May 1917, stopping at Fort Totten, before boarding the RMS Saxonia for Falmouth, England. It was the second hospital unit to leave for Europe after the first, No. 4. The hospital personnel were some of the only passengers on the ship, which was carrying munitions. At this time, there was no convoy in place, and while they did not encounter any enemy submarines they sailed through wreckage and remained on high alert until their arrival in England. After a brief stay in England, the unit made their way to France.

== In Camiers ==
Base Hospital No. 5 took over the operations of the BEF General Hospital No. 11, situated between Dannes and Camiers in Pas de Calais. The previous hospital staff had dealt with the poorly drained site through the intense influx of wounded from the Battle of the Somme, treating 8000 severely wounded and were now completely exhausted. The Harvard team undertook to clean up the site and fix the drainage, but it was not possible to correct the problem completely. In addition to drainage, there was a significant rat population, which was dealt with by obtaining some ferrets. Beyond the physical state of the site, the American forces found themselves underequipped and understaffed for a hospital of this size. Though they requested more additional support from the War Department, it took six months to be filled and only a fraction of the personnel were granted due to other needs elsewhere. As a result, they retained approximately 225 British personnel to adequately care for the wounded.

The drainage and vermin were not the only hazards of the site, located next to cement works and not far from a munitions dump, the area was under regular threat from German bombers. On 4 September 1917, one Gotha bomber dropped seven bombs, five of which were direct hits on the hospital. Lt. William Fitzsimmons, Pte. Randolph Rubinow, Pte. Oscar Tugo, and Pte. Leslie Woods were all killed in the bombing. Lt. Rae Whidden was injured and invalided home, but ultimately died of pneumonia following influenza later in the month. In addition, Lt. Clarence McGuire, Pte. Aubrey McLeod, Nurse Eva Parmelee, Lt. Thaddeus Smith, and twenty-two patients were seriously wounded in the attack. These were the first AEF casualties of the war.

In the six months Base Hospital No. 5 was stationed in Camiers they treated over 15,000 cases and 3000 in June 1917 alone. In October 1917, it was determined that the operation would move to Bolougne-sur-Mer to take over for General Hospital No. 13.

== In Bolougne-sur-Mer ==
On 1 November 1917, Base Camp Hospital No. 5 took over the BEF hospital that had been operating out of the casino in Boulogne-sur-Mer. In this location, so close to England, they provided temporary care, food, and beds for those waiting to be transported home, as well as their usual duties.

The threat of air raids continued at their new site, and the casino was an especially easy target. On 22 December 1917, bombers hit the medical stores, the base's bakery and other sites, killing 52 people and wounding 172. This constant threat added to the great relief felt by the personnel when leave was granted after nine months of work.

The transition to General Hospital No. 13 also marked changes in staff. Around this time other American units were arriving, and many of the senior medical staff were in high demand for training or for detached units. Maj. Harvey Cushing, Cpt. Elliott Cutler, Cpt. Samuel Harvey and Lt. William Terhune were all transferred to AEF hospitals to help train them as they arrived. Head Nurse Carrie Hall was called up to be the chief nurse for the American Red Cross for Great Britain in May 1918 and was succeeded by Rose Butler at the hospital. A number of other staff were detached to Mobile Hospital No. 6, which was set up in Deuxnouds-aux-Bois for the Meuse-Argonne offensive.

General Hospital No. 13 was considerably smaller than No. 11, but with the arrival of AEF forces, it meant for the first time they were often treating American casualties. First, a large influx of wounded from the 33rd American Division who had been at the Somme. And soon after, when the British began their final assault on the Montdidier area in early August 1918. From them until the end of the war, they saw a heavy succession of casualties from those of the 27th and 30th Infantry Divisions fighting at Kemmelberg and Messines Ridge on the Hindenburg Line with the British, and from the 37th and 91st serving with the French in Belgium. Even after the armistice was declared, sick and wounded continued to arrive from forward hospitals through November and December. Finally, at the beginning of February 1919, the hospital stopped taking patients.

In the twenty months of active service, Base Hospital No. 5 treated over 45,837 patients, both surgical and medical (41,015 were British and 4,822 Americans). The record number of patients treated in one day was 964. Many of these included those suffering from the 1918 flu pandemic. Numbers of fatalities were kept to a minimum through the careful study and experiments of Cpts. A.V. Bock, and G.P. Denny, with the vigilant attention of the nurses in the quarantine wards: Eva Clements, Ruth Conklin, Mary Cummings, Gertrude Gerrard, Margaret Leavitt, Edna Moir, and Eva Parmelee. The highest number of casualties the hospital received in one day was 964.

On 6 April 1919, the enlisted men boarded the SS Graf Waldersee and sailed for New York. They remained at Camp Merritt for six days before arriving at Camp Devens to be demobilized between 29 April and 2 May 1919.

== The Vanguard ==
The unit organized a variety of entertainments including variety shows and, while in Camiers, a baseball league with the nearby Canadian No. 1 and No. 3, and Chicago Units. In addition, they published their own monthly newspaper, “The Vanguard”. This was the first AEF publication overseas.

== Personnel ==
Commanding Officers

- Col. Robert U. Patterson, M. C., May 5, 1917, to February 27, 1918.
- Lieut. Col. Roger I. Lee, M. C., February 28, 1918, to September 6, 1918.
- Maj. Henry Lyman, M. C., September 7, 1918, to demobilization.

Chief of surgical service

- Lieut. Col. Roger I. Lee, M. C.
- Maj. Reginald Fitz, M. C.

Chief of medical service

- Lieut. Col. Horace Binney, M. C.

== See also ==
- American Hospital of Paris
- No. 1
- No. 17
- No. 20
- No. 36
- No. 57
- No. 116
- No. 238

== External sources ==
- Online Exhibit: Base Hospitals of the American and British Expeditionary Forces
