= American Base Hospital No. 1 =

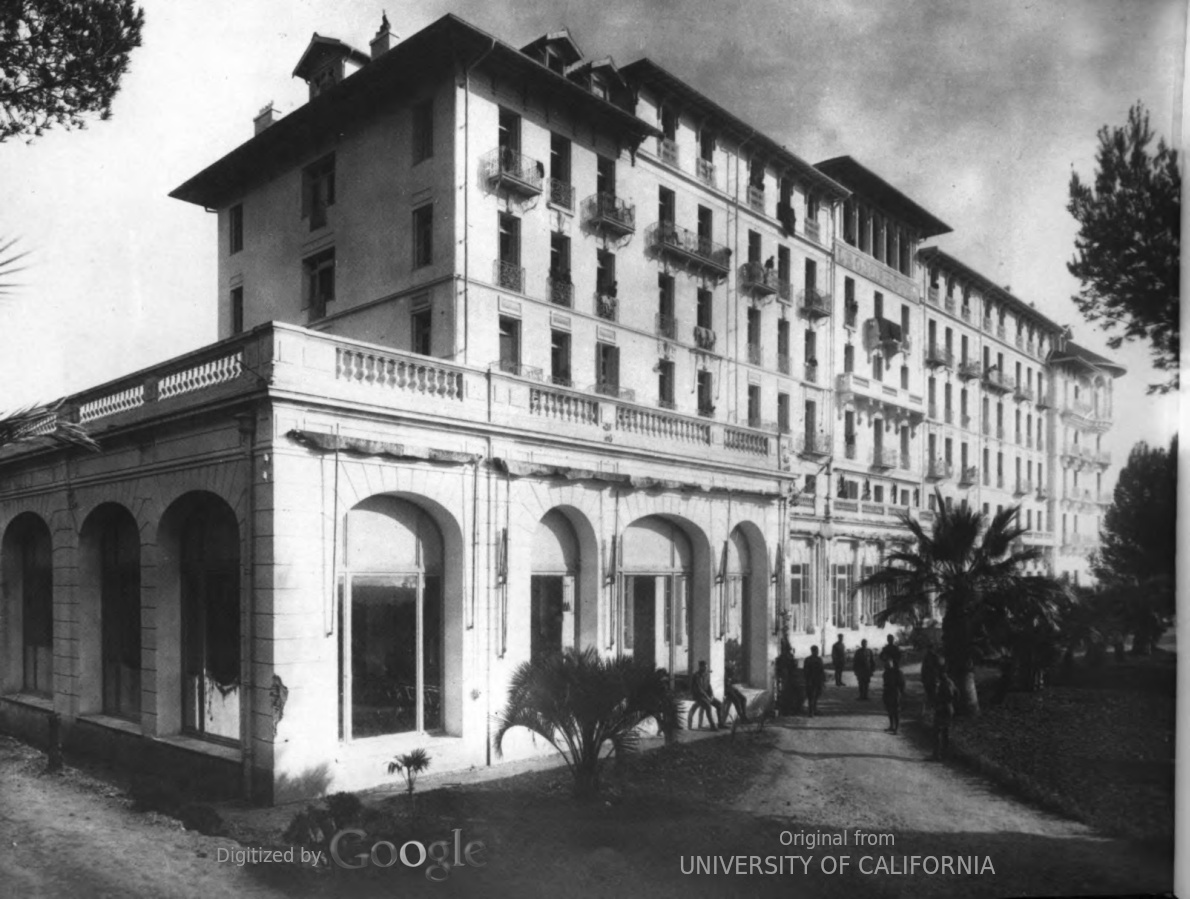
- Le Golf Hotel Hospital Center, Riviera - Group 1, Hyeres

Geography
- Location: Vichy, France

Organisation
- Care system: Government
- Type: Military hospital

Services
- Beds: 3600

History
- Founded: 1918
- Closed: 1919

Links
- Lists: Hospitals in France

American Base Hospital No. 1 was an American military hospital formed in Bellevue Hospital, New York City, United States. During the First World War the hospital moved to Vichy, France where it was set up to deal with war casualties.

== History ==
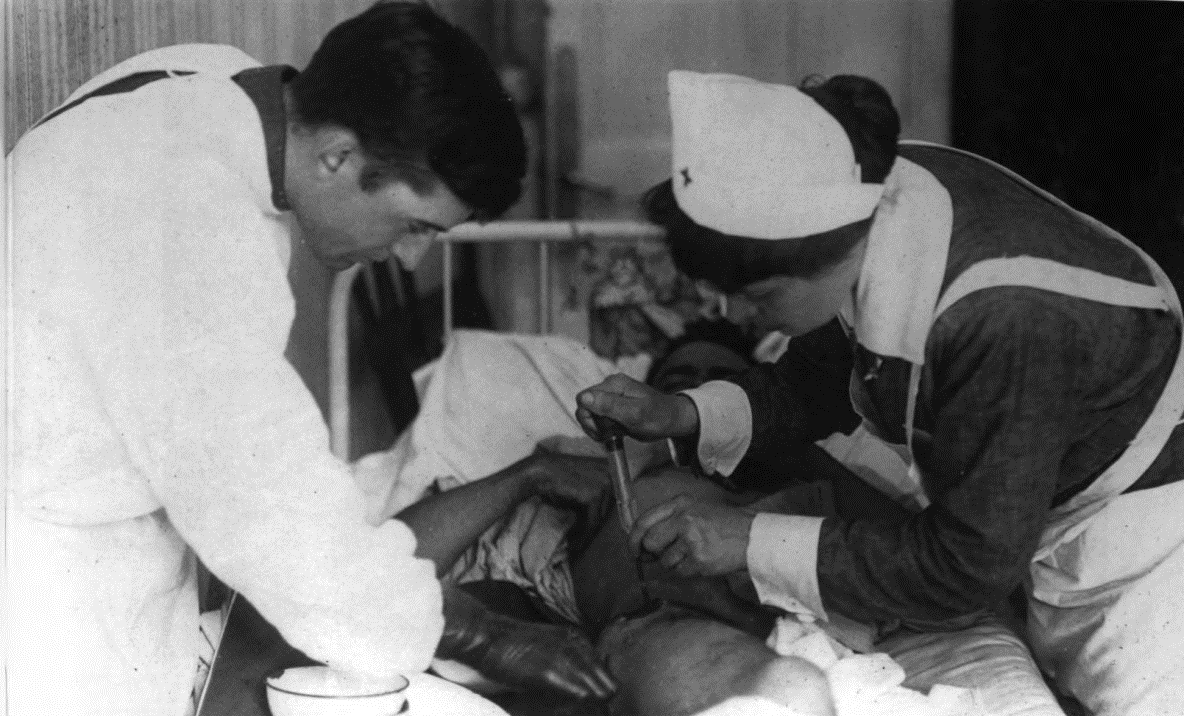
Ward surgeon irrigating a wound of the right inguinal region accompanied by a nurse

American Base Hospital No. 1 was organized in Bellevue Hospital, NYC in September 1916. After the United States entered the war in April 1917 its soldiers, as part of the American Expeditionary Forces (AEF), began to arrive France later that year. To deal with casualties the AEF would take they set a series of hospitals throughout Europe. The unit was mobilized on November 21, 1917, at the 12th Regiment Armory, NYC and trained until it left for Europe. The base personal left New York on the RMS Olympic, arriving in Liverpool, England, March 6, 1918. It then moved to Southampton, England, and shortly sailed the English Channel crossing to Le Havre, France, March 10, 1918.

It reached its final destination, Vichy, Department Allier, in the intermediate section, A. E. F., where it arrived March 12, 1918. It took over nine hotels that the French had been using as hospital units and was ready to receive patients just eight days later on March 20, 1918. The nine hotels had a total capacity of 3,600 and were titled the Convalescent Hospital No. 1 but when Base Hospital NO. 99 arrived on November 26, 1918 its title was changed to "Base Hospital." The first patients, 252 French wounded, arrived on April 9, and the first American patients, 358 in number, were admitted April 11, 1918. This hospital continued to function until January 20, 1919, during which time 8,142 surgical and 7,481 medical cases were treated.

Due to the hospital being in a series of hotels the hospital maintained 12 separate messes and occupied over 20 hotels in which sick and wounded were cared for.

In the spring of 1919 the unit returned to the United States sailing April 14, 1919, on the Princess Matoika, and arrived in Newport News, Va., April 27, 1919, where, at Camp Hill, the unit was demobilized.

== Personnel ==
Commanding Officers

- Col. Walter D. Webb, M. C., October 16, 1917, to August 24, 1918.
- Maj. Joseph McKee, M. C., August 25, 1918, to September 24, 1918.
- Lieut. Col. Arthur W. Wright, M. C., September 25, 1918, to demobilization.

Chief of surgical service

- Maj. Richard T. Atkins, M. C.

Chief of medical service

- Maj. George B. Wallace, M. C.

== See also ==
- American Hospital of Paris
- No. 5
- No. 17
- No. 20
- No. 36
- No. 57
- No. 116
- No. 238
