= American Base Hospital No. 17 =

Military hospital in Detroit, Michigan

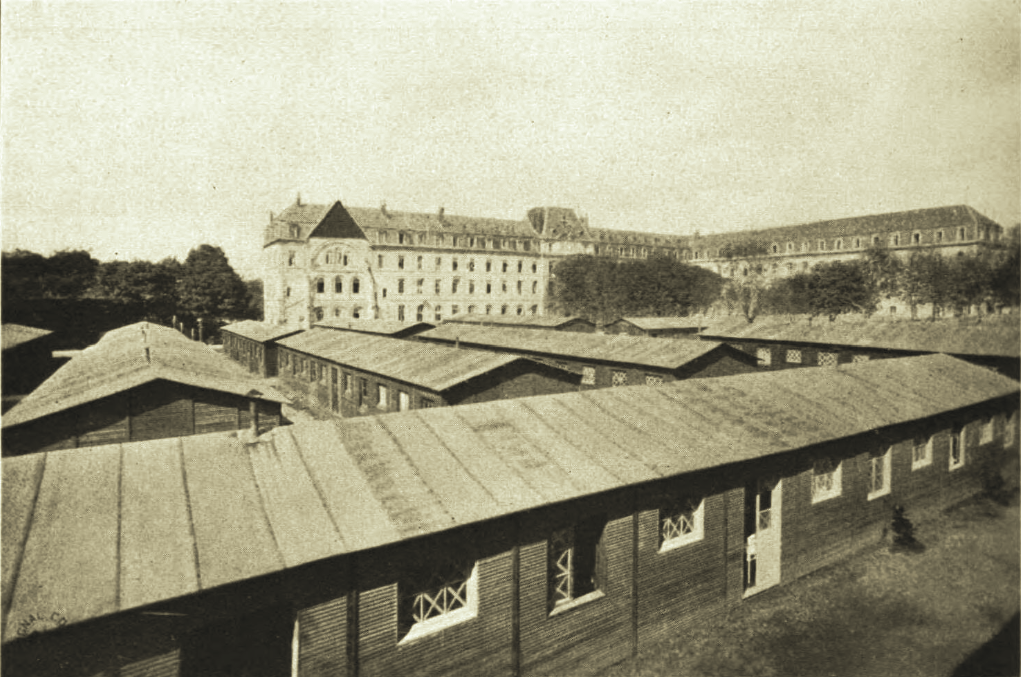
Base Hospital Number 17

American Base Hospital No. 17 was an American military hospital formed in Detroit, Michigan. During the First World War, the hospital moved to Dijon, Department Cote D'Or, France where it was set up to deal with war casualties.

== History ==
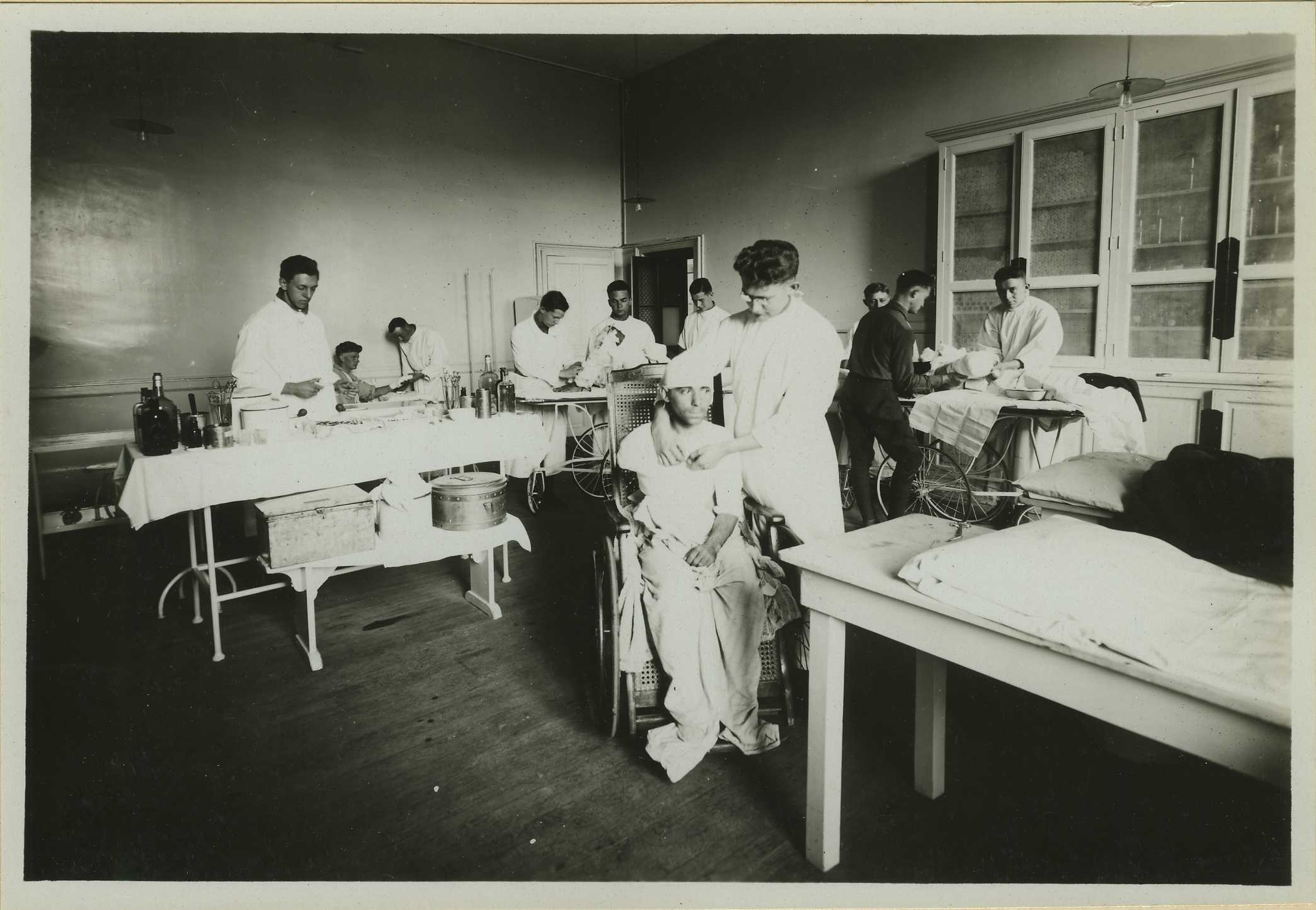
Hospital dressing room (September 5, 1918)

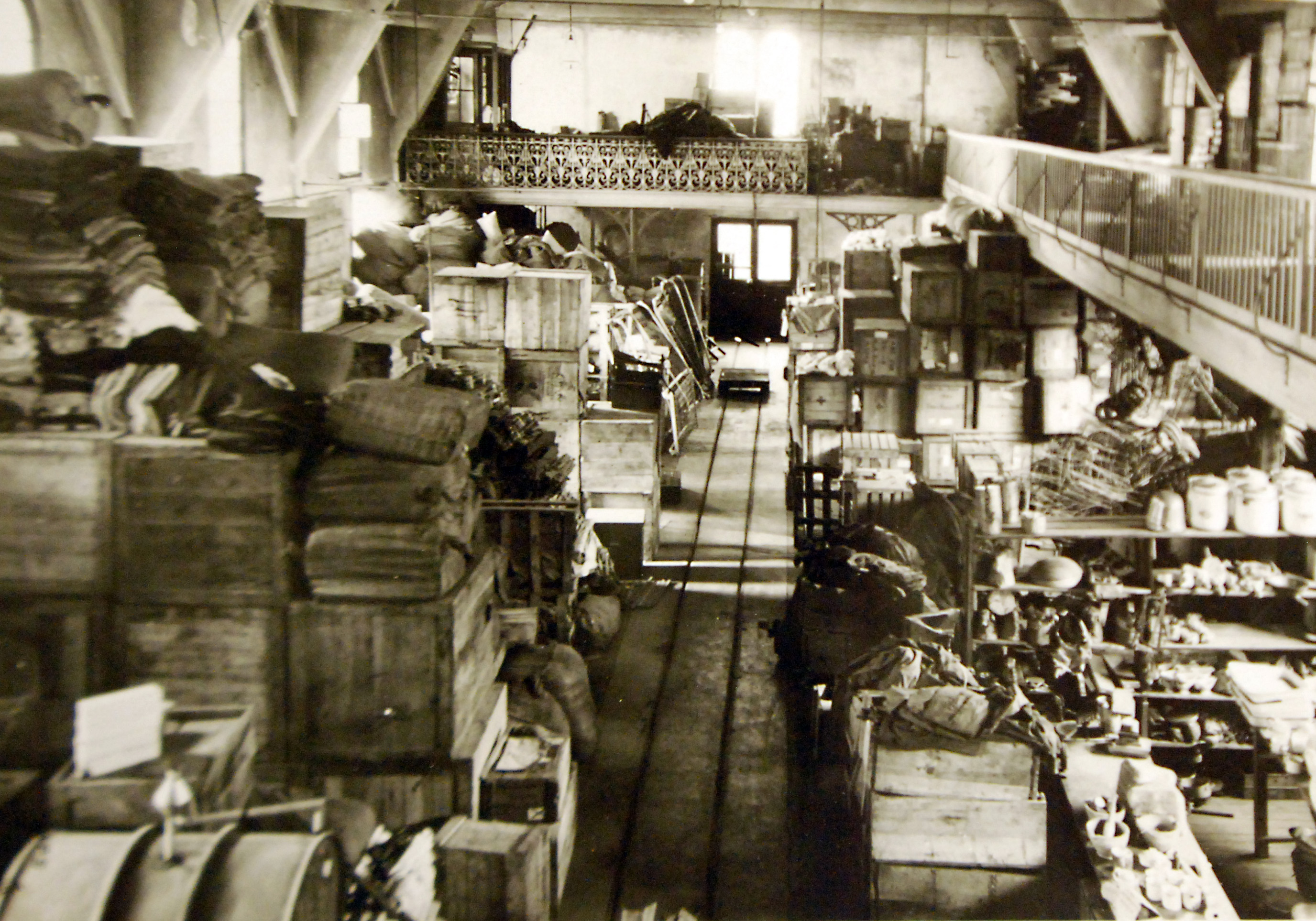
Quartermaster warehouses (September 6, 1918)

Base Hospital No. 17 was organized in September, 1916, at the Harper Hospital (now Harper University Hospital), Detroit, Michigan, and was mobilized there on June 28, 1917. On July 3, 1917, the organization was transferred to Allentown, Pennsylvania, leaving there July 11, for New York City, where it embarked on the SS Mongolia and sailed July 13, 1917. It arrived at Southampton, England, July 24, by way of Plymouth, England, and at Le Havre, France, July 25, 1917. It remained at Le Havre until July 28, when it proceeded by rail to its final destination, Dijon, in the advance section, arriving there July 29, 1917.

Base Hospital No. 17 was the first American organization to arrive at that station, where it functioned as an independent hospital, until January 8, 1919. At Dijon, the unit was assigned the Hospital St. Ignace (French Auxiliary Hospital No. 77), then operated by the French Army. The French had about 230 patients in the hospital when the unit arrived, the evacuation of which was not completed until August 18, 1917. It began receiving American patients on August 21, 1917, but the hospital was not officially turned over to the commanding officer until September 2, 1917.

In June 1918, when the capacity of the hospital proved inadequate, a French seminary was taken over at Plombières-lès-Dijon, about 3.5 miles (5.6 km) from the main hospital, and was operated as an annex. The seminary was a large stone building, of 800-bed capacity, and was used largely for convalescent and minor surgical cases.

Base Hospital No. 17 ceased to function January 8, 1919. The unit sailed from Saint-Nazaire, April 14, 1919, on the USS Princess Matoika, arriving at Newport News, Virginia, April 27, 1919. It was demobilized at Camp Custer, Kalamazoo County, Michigan, May 9, 1919.

== Personnel ==
Commanding Officer

- Col. Henry C. Coburn, M. C, June 6, 1917, to May 12, 1918.
- Col. Angus McLean, M. C, May 13, 1918, to March 24, 1919.
- Maj. Thomas K. Gruber, M. C, March 25, 1919, to demobilization.

Chief of Surgical Service

- Lieut. Col. Henry N. Torrey, M. C.

Chief of Medical Service

- Maj. George E. McKean, M. C.

Chief Nurse

- Emily A. McLaughlin

== See also ==
- American Hospital of Paris
- No. 1
- No. 5
- No. 17
- No. 20
- No. 36
- No. 57
- No. 116
- No. 238
