= McLaughlin Hall (Detroit, Michigan) =

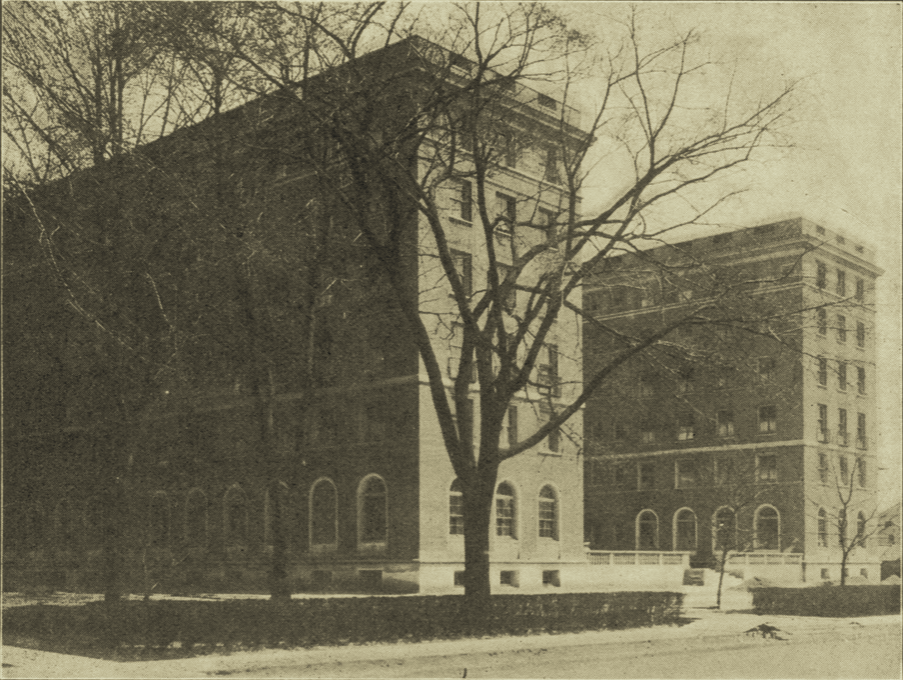
- American Journal of Nursing (1922)
- Alternative names: Emily A. McLaughlin Hall; McLaughlin Hall of the Farrand Training School, Detroit

General information
- Status: Converted into hospital administrative office building
- Type: nurses' home; nurses' training school
- Architectural style: Italian Renaissance
- Address: 3740 John R Street
- Town or city: Detroit, Michigan, U.S.
- Coordinates: 42°21′00″N 83°03′22″W
- Current tenants: Harper University Hospital
- Named for: Emily A. McLaughlin, R.N.
- Groundbreaking: March 9, 1921
- Opened: May 10, 1922
- Affiliation: Farrand Training School

Dimensions
- Diameter: 145 ft × 116 ft (44 m × 35 m)

Technical details
- Floor count: 6
- Lifts/elevators: 1
- Known for: World War I memorial building

McLaughlin Hall (also known as Emily A. McLaughlin Hall, or McLaughlin Hall of the Farrand Training School, Detroit) is an American World War I memorial building in Detroit, Michigan, located at 3740 John R Street. Completed in 1922, it originally functioned as a nurses' home and as a nurses' training school, both associated with Harper Hospital. By 2015, the building was repurposed for hospital administrative offices.

McLaughlin Hall was said to be the most beautiful and complete nurses' home in the U.S. It was donated to Harper Hospital by James Couzens, mayor of Detroit. The home is a memorial to the nurses of the Farrand Training School, who served during World War I and is the first memorial in the U.S. dedicated to nurses of the war. In addition to living rooms, principal's quarters, nurses' rooms and the infirmary, there is a large demonstration and lecture room, a smaller classroom and a laboratory. All these rooms are equipped for teaching and demonstration.

== Early history ==
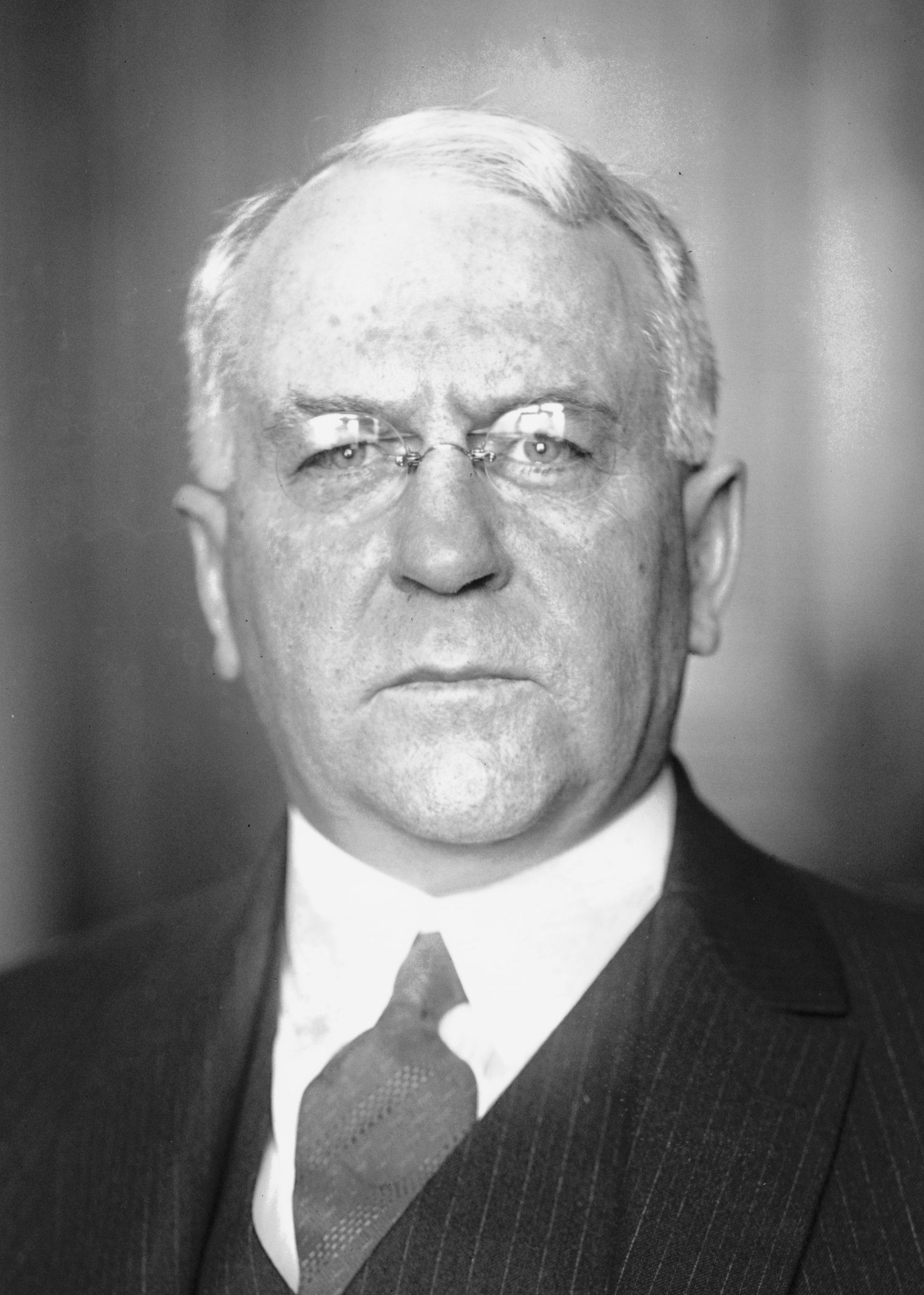
James Couzens

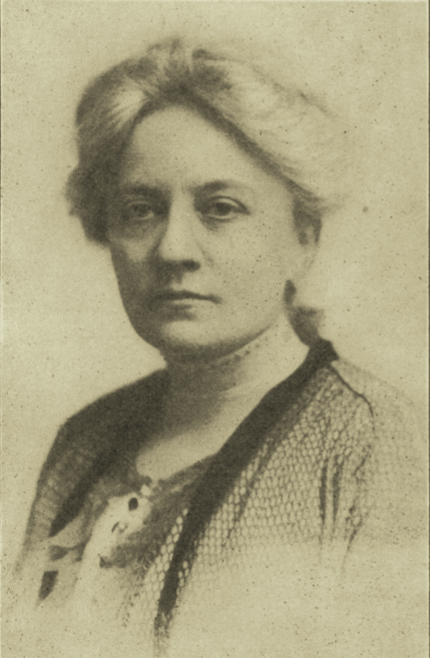
Emily A. McLaughlin

The school was the recipient of a gift of a half million dollars for the purpose of building a nurses' home as a memorial to the services of Farrand Training School Nurses who served during World War I. James Couzens was the donor. At his request, the Board of Trustees named the new home McLaughlin Hall in honor of Emily A. McLaughlin, Principal of the Farrand Training School, who was Chief Nurse of Base Hospital 17 in France. This unit was for the most part made up of Farrand Training School graduates. Almost the entire personnel of American Base Hospital No. 17 were Harper Hospital physicians and nurses.

Sod was turned for the building March 9, 1921 by McLaughlin. The opening of the Home took place on the occasion of the graduating exercises, May 10, 1922, National Hospital Day. Initially, the Home housed 285 people.

== Grounds ==
The building is located on a large plot of ground south of the hospital, with which it is connected by a tunnel.

The property includes sunken gardens and tennis courts. The sunken gardens are of formal design to correspond with the architecture of the building and are enclosed in evergreens which are to be used as a ground cover in the form of a hedge. The same plan was construed for the front of the building. The landscape gardening was a gift of Travis Brothers of Michigan, while the trees and shrubs were the gift of Greening Brothers Nursery at Monroe, Michigan.

== Architecture and fittings ==
The building is in the shape of an inverted U surrounding a 75 feet (23 m) court, It has a frontage of 145 feet (44 m) and a depth of 116 feet (35 m). It is entirely fireproof, of steel and brick. The building is trimmed with limestone and is of the Italian Renaissance style. It is six stories high and was in harmony with the other units of the Harper Hospital plant. It was planned so that the foundations would carry another story if necessary.

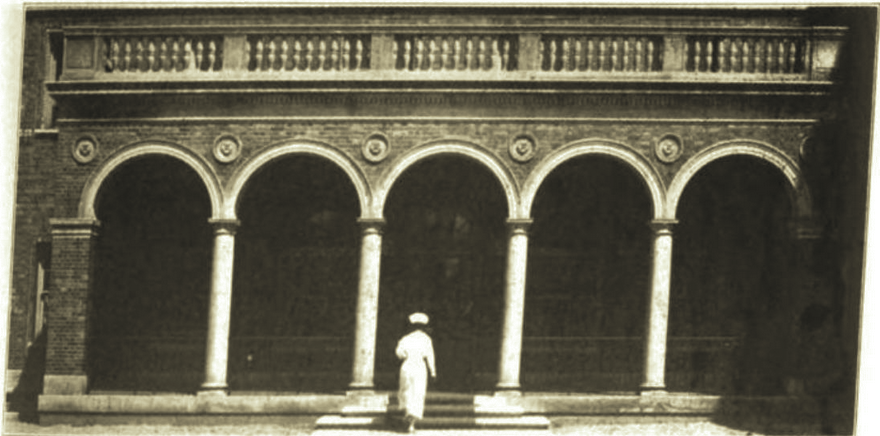
Main entrance

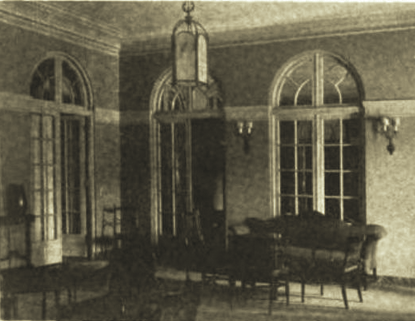
Reception hall

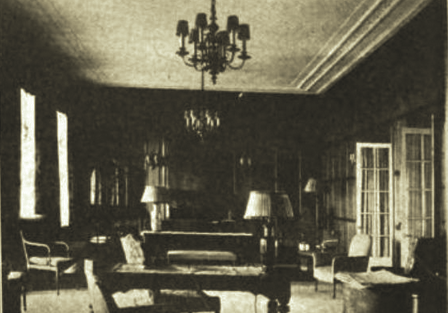
Living room

The Home's entryway is through a wide porch and passes through a reception and living room to a rear porch facing sunken gardens and tennis courts.

There are, on each floor above the first, 28 single and 11 double rooms. The floors are all of concrete while the halls and bath rooms are finished in terrizeno. The two staircases, one in each wing, are designed to be used, also, as fire escapes. It was built with one automatic elevator. All windows are 46 inches (1,200 mm) wide.

On the first floor, there are classrooms in the north wing, reception rooms in the center, while in the south wing are 11 rooms for graduate nurses and a suite for the Principal of the Training School.

The pupil nurses have also for their almost exclusive use one large living room, library and reception room besides a general reception hall. The graduate nurses are provided for by a large reception room in the south wing. This room is furnished and has telephone service with the remainder of the hospital and the home. It has writing desks and magazines.

A business office came with a switch board containing two outside lines independent of the hospital. The telephone operator also manipulates the buzzers in every room. Electric light switches controlling the lighting of halls and stairs is controlled from this office as a fire protection.

The basement auditorium is available for dances, as well as a place for Alumnae banquets and meetings, school meetings and lectures to the entire school. Dressing rooms for men and women and storage quarters for chairs and banquet tables are provided. Doors open out upon the sunken gardens. Three hundred people can be seated in the auditorium and later easily served refreshments, because there is a fully equipped kitchen. The basement also contains a rest room for service personnel where they keep their outer garments, rest, wash and dress before leaving for the day. There is a side entrance for their coming and going. Trunk rooms and linen rooms for nurses' laundry and house linen complete the basement plan with the exception of the laundry for the use of pupil nurses. During the time the electricity is turned on for use of electric irons, a bright red glass button glows continuously indicating fire precautions.

On the second floor is an infirmary for pupil nurses who are convalescing or who do not need to be in the hospital. A kitchen and bath are attached and extra doors for isolation, if desired.

All rugs are of soft greys or taupes and of mixed design, not easily showing dust. The drapes are of colors chosen by occupants. The walls are putty color. The halls are covered with waxed battle ship lineoleum and the floors are painted nearly the same color. There is a kitchenette on every floor in the building and an adequate amount of equipment is furnished. The Home is characterized in its furnishings by stability and simplicity added to which is the artistic selection in color and design.

== Sleeping quarters ==
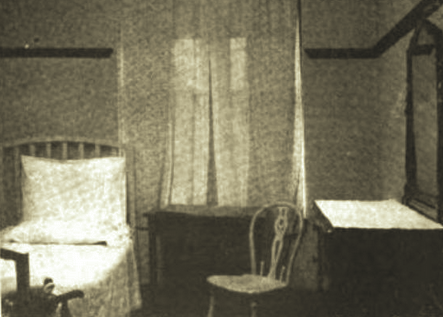
Bedroom

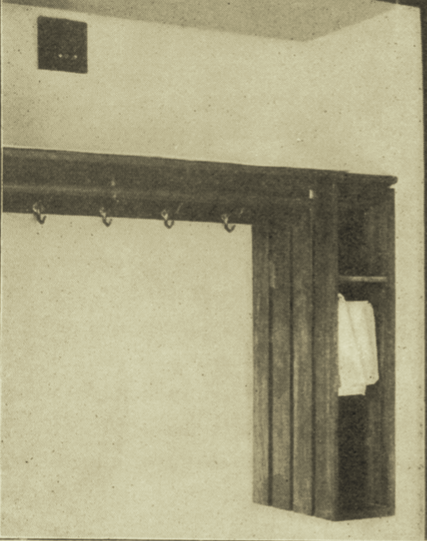
Wardrobe closet

Across the rear of every floor above the first are 11 double rooms and each has a stationary washstand, two closets, two bureaus, two chairs and large rugs. In each wing, are 12 single rooms and the bath rooms. On each floor there are four showers, four tubs, and 16 wash basins, separated by cubicles. The showers are of marble. This is in addition to the stationary washstands in the double rooms and the baths of the supervisors. In the southwest and northeast corners of the building are suites of two rooms and a bath for two supervisors shut off from the main hallway by an entrance. This gives 10 suites for supervisors, while the principal of the Training School and her assistant have individual suites especially designed for them.

Mahogany furniture of colonial design is used in the supervisors' rooms while the student nurses have low artistic metal beds, enameled in brown or cream, and walnut furniture. Every room has a buzzer in the built-in wardrobe closet which is manipulated from the telephone desk. The occupant is expected to go to the telephone which is found on every landing, when called. All student nurses' rooms have a plate rail around the room, in place of a picture moulding. A device for holding towels and wash cloth, designed by McLaughlin, as part of the wardrobe closets is included in bedrooms. All bedroom doors have transoms except on the sixth floor.

== School rooms and laboratory ==
The entire north wing of the first floor is given over to the training school and include proper school equipment. One large demonstration and lecture room seats 65 pupils and has room for six beds. It is a workroom and has closets and cabinets which contain the necessary articles for the successful demonstration of practical nursing procedure. it also contains a stationary washstand with hot and cold water, an ample blackboard and student chairs with wide arms for convenience in writing class and lecture notes. There is an electric plate which may be attached to various plugs in different parts of the room. A smaller classroom is equipped with special convenience for the teaching of anatomy. It seats 30 persons and contains skeletons, models, and anatomical charts. Still another classroom seats 40 students and is used for a study room, classroom, or examination room as needed. A laboratory in which there is arrangement for 14 Bunsen burners, any number of microscope lams an dsinks, large and small, furnishes the needed arrangement for teaching solutions in materia medica, microscopic work in bacteriology and test tube demonstrations in the examination of urine.

The overhead duplex-o-lite lighting is uniform through the room and casts no shadows. Two of the classrooms contain stationary wash stands, desks for the instructors, and all of them have blackboards.

Connected with the teaching wing is a lavatory containing three wash basins and three toilets.

The library off the living room was designed to hold 1,000 volumes, but the architect added paneling with secret shelves for future use.

There are two full time instructors for the Farrand Training School and each has an office of her own. A science laboratory for urinalysis, etc. completes the class wing.
