= Henry Opitek =

First person to survive open heart surgery

Henry Opitek (January 6, 1911 – March 13, 1981) became the first patient to survive open heart surgery in 1952.

On July 3, 1952, Opitek, a 41-year-old male suffering from shortness of breath, made medical history at Harper University Hospital in Michigan. The Dodrill-GMR heart machine, considered by some to be the first operational mechanical heart was successfully used while performing heart surgery on Opitek. Forest Dewey Dodrill, a surgeon at Wayne State University's Harper Hospital in Detroit, used the machine to bypass Opitek's left ventricle for 50 minutes while he opened the patient's left atrium and worked to repair the mitral valve. In Dodrill's post operative report he notes, "To our knowledge, this is the first instance of survival of a patient when a mechanical heart mechanism was used to take over the complete body function of maintaining the blood supply of the body while the heart was open and operated on."
