= John Berton Carnett =

American surgeon (1890–1934)

John Berton Carnett (1890–1934) was an American surgeon remembered for Carnett's sign. He was Professor of Surgery at the University of Pennsylvania School of Medicine, and was Director of American Base Hospital No. 20 in Chatel-Guyon, France, during the First World War.

== First World War ==
Carnett organized the University of Pennsylvania's Base Hospital No. 20. He helped secure finances for the equipment and recruited the medical staff. In April 1917, he became director of the hospital, when the United States entered the War. After arriving in France in June, he and a few other personnel were detached from the Base Hospital to form Surgical Operating Team No. 62. Carnett and the other members of his team received a letter of commendation for their work from General John J. Pershing.
