= Forest Dewey Dodrill =

American Open heart surgeon

- Born: January 26, 1902; Webster Springs, West Virginia
- Died: June 28, 1997 (aged 95); Baltimore, Maryland
- Education: Harvard Medical School; University of Michigan
- Known for: Open heart surgery
- Scientific career
- Fields: Surgery
- Workplaces: Harper University Hospital, Wayne State University

Forest Dewey Dodrill (January 26, 1902 – June 28, 1997) was a medical doctor at Harper University Hospital at Wayne State University in Michigan who performed the first successful open heart surgery using a mechanical pump.

== Biography ==
Dodrill was born in Webster Springs, West Virginia and attended West Virginia University, where he earned his bachelor's degree in 1925, he attended Harvard Medical School, graduating in 1930. Dodrill was an intern and resident at Harper Hospital in Detroit where he became a staff surgeon. He undertook a thoracic surgical residency at the University of Michigan in the early 1940s, receiving a M.Ch. degree from in 1942.

On July 3, 1952, Dodrill completed the first successful open heart surgery on the left ventricle of Henry Opitek. He used a machine developed by himself and researchers at General Motors, the Dodrill-GMR, considered to be the first operational mechanical heart used while performing open heart surgery.
