= Dodrill–GMR =

The Dodrill–GMR machine was the first operational mechanical heart successfully used while performing open heart surgery. It was developed by Forest Dewey Dodrill, a surgeon at Harper University Hospital in Detroit, and General Motors Research.

On July 3, 1952, 41-year-old Henry Opitek suffering from shortness of breath made medical history at Harper University Hospital in Michigan. The Dodrill–GMR heart machine, considered by some to be the first operational mechanical heart was successfully used while performing heart surgery. The machine performs the functions of the heart, allowing doctors to detour blood and stop the heart of a patient during an operation. The machine is external of the body and is only used during an operation. Dodrill, a surgeon at Wayne State University's Harper Hospital in Detroit, developed the machine with funding from The American Heart Association and volunteer engineers from General Motors.

The machine had two sides, each one working as a half of a human heart. Each side had multiple pumps, consisting of a glass cylinder with two valves and a pneumatically operated finger cot, that acted as a membrane pump.

Dodrill used the machine in 1952 to bypass Henry Opitek’s left ventricle for 50 minutes while he opened the patient's left atrium and worked to repair the mitral valve. In Dodrill’s post operative report he notes, “To our knowledge, this is the first instance of survival of a patient when a mechanical heart mechanism was used to take over the complete body function of maintaining the blood supply of the body while the heart was open and operated on".
