= Harper University Hospital =

- Detroit Medical Center
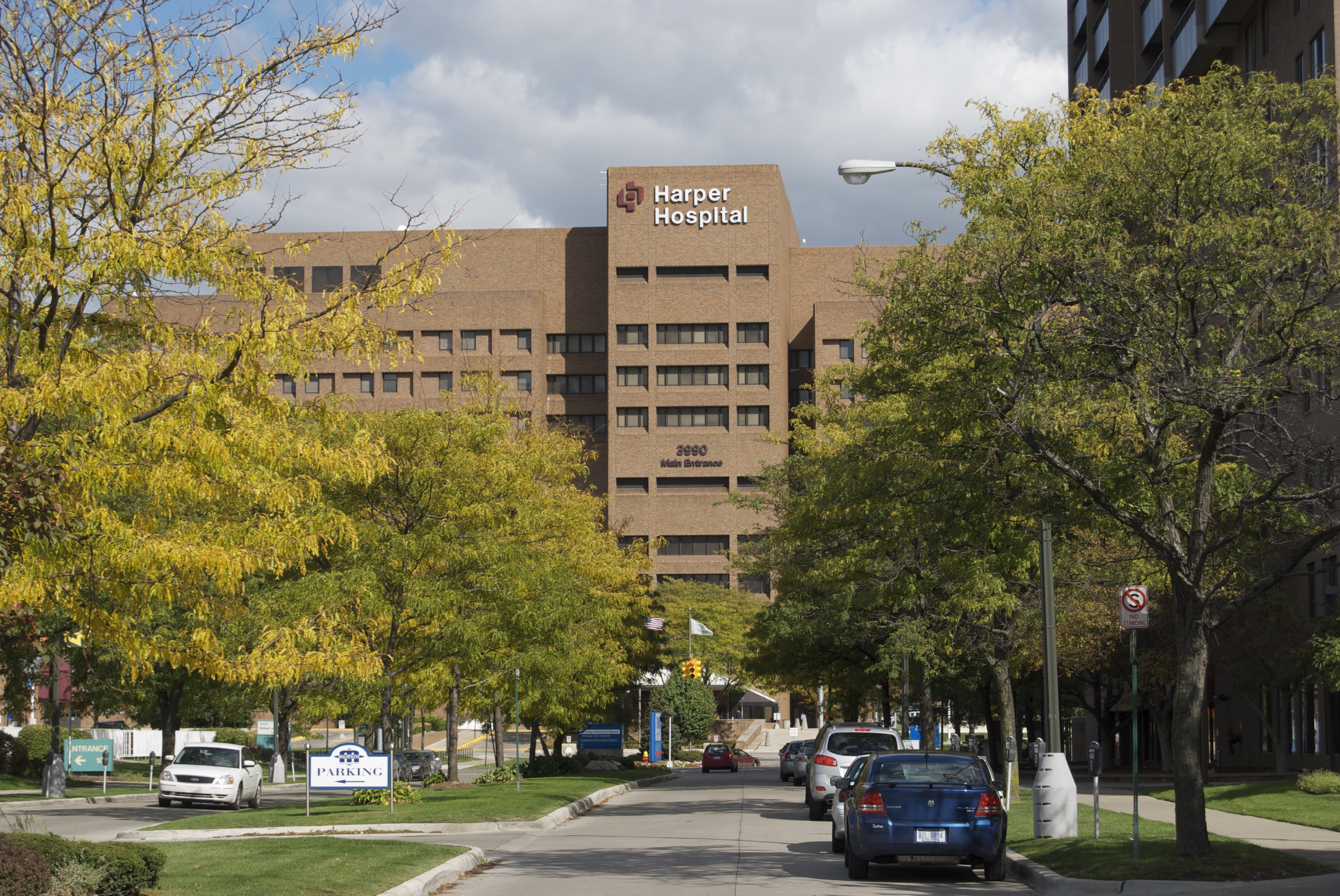
- Harper Hospital

Geography
- Location: Detroit, Michigan, United States
- Coordinates: 42.35211°N 83.0571°W

Organization
- Affiliated university: Wayne State University School of Medicine

History
- Founded: 1863

Links
- Website: www.harperhutzel.org
- Lists: Hospitals in Michigan

Harper University Hospital is one of eight hospitals and institutes that compose the Detroit Medical Center. Harper offers services in a broad range of clinical areas, including cardiology, neurology, neurosurgery, organ transplant, plastic surgery, general surgery, bariatric (weight loss surgery) endocrinology, and sleep disorders.

== History ==
Established in 1863, Harper is among the oldest U.S. medical teaching institutions.

Nursing became professionalized in the late 19th century, opening a new middle-class career for talented young women of all social backgrounds. The Harper Hospital School of Nursing, begun in 1884, was a national leader. Its graduates worked at the hospital and also in institutions, public health services, as private duty nurses, and volunteered for duty at military hospitals during the Spanish–American War and the two world wars.

=== World War I ===
American Base Hospital No. 17 was organized at Harper Hospital in September 1916. It provided services in Dijon, Department Cote D'or, France. It was demobilized at Camp Custer in Michigan on May 9, 1919. McLaughlin Hall of the Farrand Training School was built in 1922 to honor the nurses associated with the war-time hospital.

=== First successful open heart surgery ===
Harper was the site of the world's first successful open-heart operation, using a mechanical heart called the Dodrill-GMR developed by a General Motors engineer with Harper physicians, including Forest Dewey Dodrill. The mechanical blood-pumping machine allowed a human heart to be temporarily stopped and operated on while the machine maintained blood circulation in the patient's body. The successful first surgery occurred on 3 July 1952.

=== Recent ===
In 2004, Harper was the first to debut the Intraoperative Magnetic Resonance Imaging (iMRI) system in Michigan. Also in 2004, surgeons at Harper were the first to perform a kidney transplant on an HIV recipient.

The hospital is now staffed by faculty of the Wayne State University School of Medicine.

== Rankings and accreditation ==
Harper is in The Leapfrog Group’s 2008 Top Hospital list for patient quality and safety. The Leapfrog Group rankings are based on a survey conducted at 1,220 hospitals across the country.

Harper University Hospital ranked above the national average in a survey compiled by the Centers for Medicare and Medicaid Services (CMS) and the Federal Department of Health and Human Services. The list included data from 4,807 hospitals across the United States. Of those hospitals, only 38 were ranked above the national average. The results are meant to assist the public in assessing how well their area hospitals care for patients with specific types of medical conditions, including heart failure and heart attacks.

Harper University Hospital has received full approval from the Surgical Review Corporation (SRC) and the American Society for Bariatric Surgery (ASBS) as a Bariatric Center of Excellence. This accreditation recognizes that Harper's bariatric program meets the patient care standards as set forth by the SRC and ASBS.

=== Hospital rating data from HealthGrades website ===
The HealthGrades website contains the clinical quality data for Harper University Hospital, as of 2017. For this rating section three different types of data from HealthGrades are presented: clinical quality ratings for twenty-nine inpatient conditions and procedures, thirteen patient safety indicators and the percentage of patients giving the hospital as a 9 or 10 (the two highest possible ratings).

For inpatient conditions and procedures, there are three possible ratings: worse than expected, as expected, better than expected. For this hospital the data for this category is:

- Worse than expected - 5
- As expected - 22
- Better than expected - 2

For patient safety indicators, there are the same three possible ratings. For this hospital safety indicators were rated as:

- Worse than expected - 6
- As expected - 7
- Better than expected - 0

Percentage of patients rating this hospital as a 9 or 10 - 68% Percentage of patients who on average rank hospitals as a 9 or 10 - 69%

== Cardio Team One ==
Harper, along with Detroit Receiving Hospital and Sinai-Grace Hospital, is the home of Cardio Team One, a specialized initiative designed to reduce the response time for patients presenting at emergency room with severe cardiac disease.

== Gallery ==
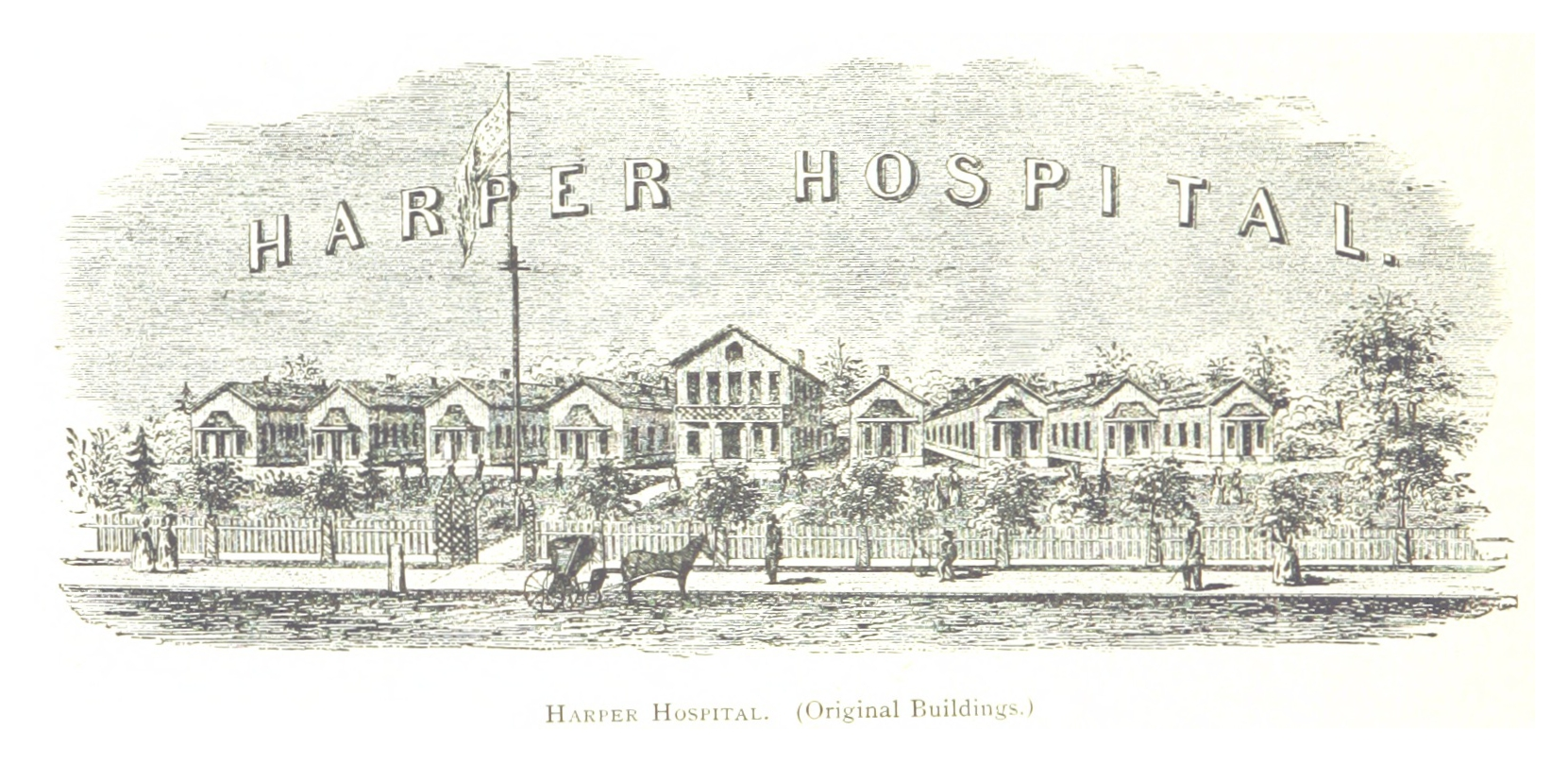
The original hospital complex in an 1884 drawing by Silas Farmer

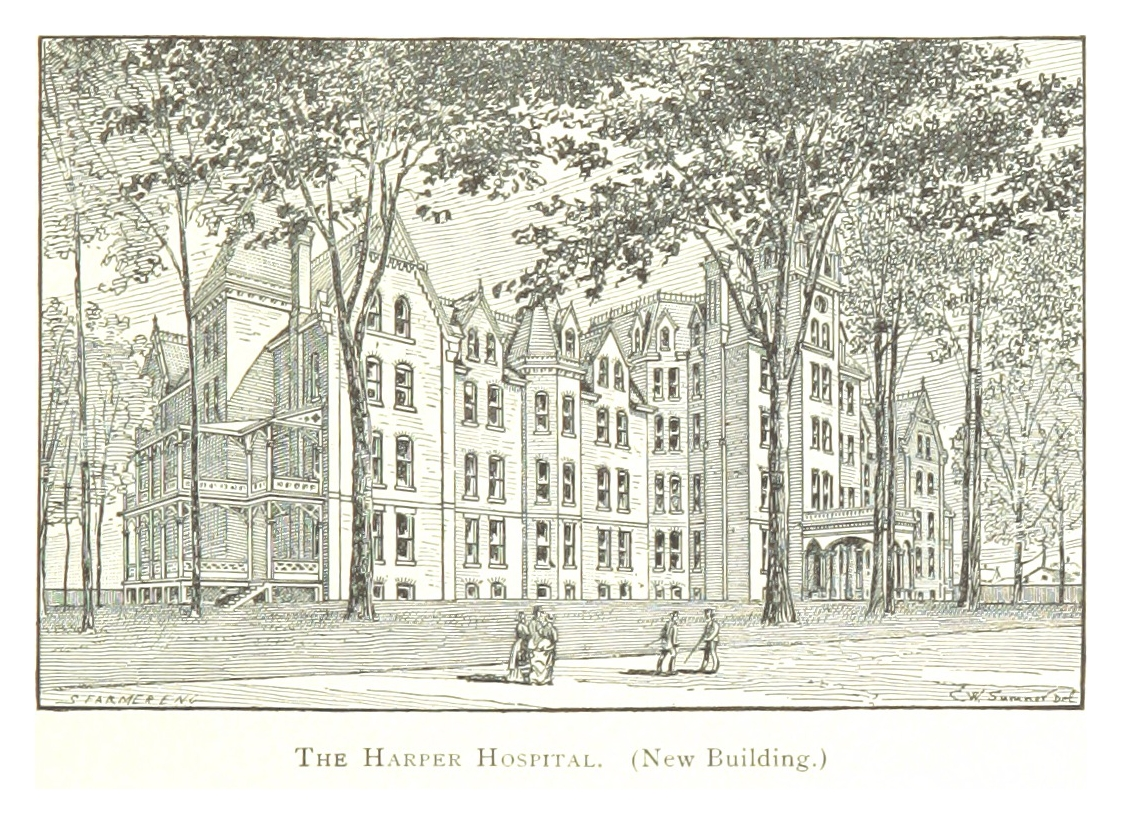
The new hospital building, designed by Elijah E. Myers and demolished in the 1970s

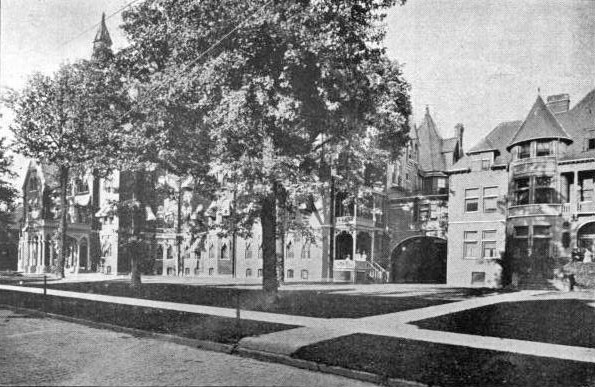
Harper Hospital, c. 1899

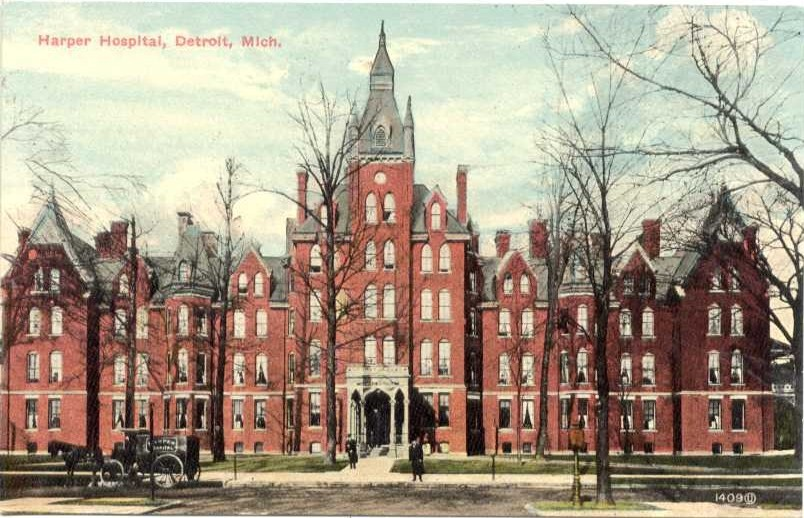
Early 1900s postcard of the hospital
