= American Base Hospital No. 116 =

American Base Hospital No. 1
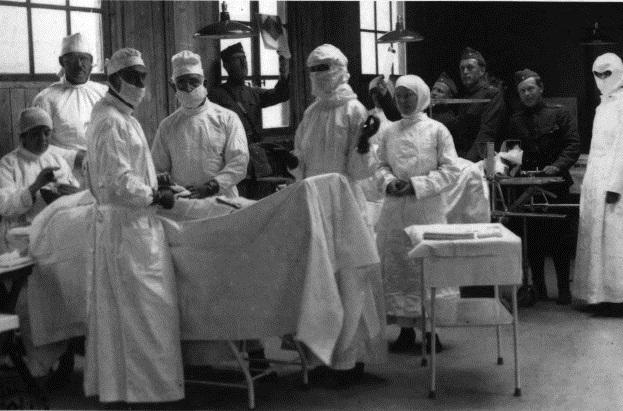
- Lieutenant Colonel Wolkes and Major Hold in charge of the operating room at Hospital Unit No 116, June 1918

Geography
- Location: Bazoilles-sur-Meuse, Department Vosges, in the advance section, France

Organisation
- Care system: Government
- Type: Military

Services
- Beds: 2,000

History
- Founded: 1918

Links
- Lists: Hospitals in France

American Base Hospital No. 116 was an American military hospital formed in New York City, United States. During the First World War the hospital moved to Bazoilles-sur-Meuse, Department Vosges, in the advance section, France where it was set up to deal with war casualties.

== History ==
After the United States entered the war in April 1917 its soldiers, as part of the American Expeditionary Forces (AEF), began to arrive in France later that year. To deal with casualties the AEF would take they set a series of hospitals throughout Europe. American Base Hospital No. 116 was organized December 20, 1917, at the Seventy-first Regiment Armory, NYC and trained until it left for Europe. It sailed for Europe on the Mauretania; arrived at Liverpool, England, April 3, 1918. It quickly traversed the country to Southampton; crossed the English Channel on the night of April 5; landed at Le Havre, France, April 6. From then the hospital unit moved to its destination the Bazoilles-sur-Meuse, Department Vosges, in the advance section where it arrived on April 9. Base Hospital No. 116 was the third unit to arrive in the area. Taking control of a type A barracks, with crisis expansion in marquee tents, giving a total capacity of 2,000 beds. Its first patient was received June 2, 1918, with its new operating room opening just days before the above photograph was taken on June 15, 1918. While its doors were open it cared for 5,837 medical and 6,603 surgical cases, with 1,259 operations and was designated as a special hospital for ear, nose, and throat and fracture cases in the hospital center. On July 20, 1918, the hospital began to operate a neuropsychiatric department where it admitted 1,048 cases.

Three months after the November 11, 1918 cease-fire, on January 29, 1919, Base Hospital No. 116 ceased operating and turned over its patients and plant to Base Hospital No. 79. Its staff returned to America in March sailing from St. Nazaire March 28, 1919, on the Turrialba; arrived at Hoboken, N. J., April 13, 1919, and were demobilized shortly afterward.

== Personnel ==
Commanding Officers

- Col. John W. Hanner, M. C., December 19, 1917, to June 27, 1918.
- Lieut. Col. John B. Walker, M. C., June 28, 1918, to January 16, 1919.
- Lieut. Col. Michael J. Thornton, M. C., January 17, 1919, to February 20, 1919.
- Maj. Carlton W. Russell, M. C., February 21, 1919, to demobilization.

Chief of surgical service

- Lieut. Col. John B. Walker, M. C.
- Maj. Torr W. Harmer, M. C.

Chief of medical service

- Maj. Theodore J. Abbott, M. C.
- Capt. Frederic A. Alling, M. C.

== See also ==
- American Hospital of Paris
- American Base Hospital No. 5
