= Sumner Jackson =

Sumner Waldron Jackson (1885–1945), called "Dr. Jack", was a medical doctor in France during both World War I and World War II. Despite being an American and although the United States was at war with Nazi Germany, the Germans occupying France permitted Jackson to continue to work at the American Hospital of Paris during World War II. Jackson and his wife and son were involved in the French Resistance to the German occupation. Jackson helped wounded British and American airmen elude Nazi capture and escape to Great Britain and the Jackson home served as a "drop box" and meeting place for Resistance members. Jackson, his wife, and son were arrested by the Germans in 1944. He died in the mistaken bombing by the British of a ship carrying prisoners shortly before the end of the war in Europe in May 1945. His wife and son survived.

== Early life ==
Sumner Waldron Jackson was born October 7, 1885, in Spruce Head, Maine. He attended Waldoboro High School and Lincoln Academy in Newcastle, Maine. He graduated from Bowdoin College in 1909. He was trained as a medical doctor at Jefferson Medical College in Philadelphia. In 1915, he became a medical intern at Massachusetts General Hospital in Boston. Waldron was described by author Charles Glass as a "tall, strong, and silent Yankee...an outdoorsman of the harsh American Northeast."

== World War I ==
The American Hospital of Paris during World War I

In 1916, Jackson joined the second Harvard Surgical Unit of American doctors and nurses who volunteered to serve in the British Royal Army Medical Corps. He arrived in France in June 1916. He was assigned as a surgeon and medical officer in a British military hospital near the front lines where the Battle of the Somme began on July 1, 1916. British and French casualties in the five month-long battle totaled more than 600,000. Jackson was assigned to a medical group near the front lines. The medical personnel suffered casualties.

In 1917, with the entry of the United States in the War, Jackson joined the U.S. Army Medical Corps. He was of only a few American doctors with experience treating battlefield casualties. He was assigned to a Red Cross hospital in Paris with American and French soldiers evacuated from the front lines. Between July 1917 and July 1919, Jackson worked on a mobile hospital unit as well as being a staff member of four different hospitals. At one hospital he met a Swiss nurse named Charlotte Sylvie Barrelet de Ricout, called "Toquette". They were married near Paris on November 29, 1917. He was 32 years old; she was 27. Toquette was small in stature and athletic, a very good tennis player. She spoke fluent English. In 1928, the couple had a son, Phillip (called "Pete").

== Between the wars ==
In July 1919, Jackson and his wife, Toquette, returned to the United States. Toquette was homesick and in September 1921 they returned to France. In seeking employment as a doctor, Jackson encountered French bureaucracy. To become a medical doctor in France he had to learn French, graduate from a French high school, obtain a bachelor's degree, and graduate from a French medical school. Jackson spent four years meeting those requirements and then went to work as a surgeon and urologist at the American Hospital of Paris. Treating Americans living in France, of whom almost 30,000 lived in Paris, and the European aristocracy, the hospital was called a "fortress of snobbery." Jackson and Toquette lived in the luxurious 16th Arrondissement, not far from the hospital. The American community of France in the late 1930s was divided among those who supported the fascist insurgents in Spain (aided by Nazi Germany) and those who supported the Republican government (aided by the communist Soviet Union). The Jacksons were in the camp of the Republican supporters.

== World War II ==
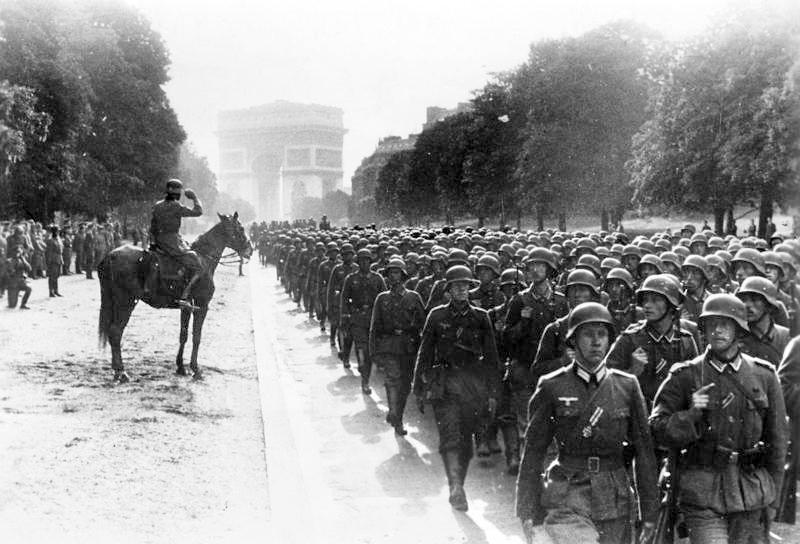
German soldiers marching down Avenue Foch

Nazi Germany invaded France in May 1940 and advanced rapidly on Paris in early June. Jackson's wife and son joined an exodus of two million Parisians fleeing the Germans. In August, they returned to Paris, now occupied by the Germans. Jackson remained in the hospital, treating wounded French and British soldiers. The United States was still a non-combatant and the Germans allowed the hospital to continue to function as it relieved their obligation to treat wounded enemy soldiers. On February 13, 1941, Jackson was appointed by the Board of Governors as Chief Physician of the hospital. However, on September 24, 1942, after the United States had entered the war against Germany, the Germans rounded up and arrested 1,400 Americans in Paris. Jackson was among those arrested, but he was released on October 3. A prominent Frenchman with good relations with the Germans petitioned for his release.

Jackson's first resistance activity was helping wounded British and American soldiers elude German captivity. Jackson hid and treated wounded soldiers and airmen and helped them escape from France via the newly created escape and evasion lines. In summer 1943, the Goélette-Frégate resistance network, created by Charles de Gaulle's Free France organization, recruited the Jackson family to became involved with the resistance. Their home at 11 Avenue Foch was perfect—one story with exits both front and back onto two different streets—as a "drop box" for documents and for meetings of resistants. People came and went frequently to the house so visitors were not unusual or noticeable. Avenue Foch was also the headquarters of the various organizations making up the German Gestapo, most notably the nearby headquarters of the Sicherheitsdienst (SD) at 84 Avenue Foch, headed in Paris by spycatcher Josef Kieffer.

Toquette was the principal liaison with the Goélette-Frégate network as Jackson worked long hours at the hospital. The family's luck ran out on May 25, 1944, when the pro-Nazi French Milice arrested all three of them. Jackson had been warned that he was being watched by the Germans and their French allies, but he ignored the warnings. Toquette was sent initially to a women's prison at Romainville and then transported with many other women to Ravensbruck concentration camp in Germany. Sumner and sixteen-year-old son Philip were sent to Neuengamme, near Hamburg in Germany. In April 1945, in the final days of the war, Toquette was near death at Ravensbruck. She was skeletal and had dysentery and open sores. The Swedish Red Cross, headed by Folke Bernadotte, secured permission from the Germans to evacuate several thousand Scandinavian women from the concentration camp. British nurse Mary Lindell persuaded the Germans to allow the British, Americans, and French in the camp to be included among the evacuees. Toquette and others were transported to Sweden safely by the White Buses and ships. She survived.

Sumner and his son Phillip were evacuated from Neuengamme as the Soviet Army was advancing rapidly toward the camp. On April 21, 1945, they were taken along with many other prisoners to the port city of Lübeck. There, they were loaded onto the Thielbek, one of three prison ships. As an American, Sumner was told he could be freed by the Swedes, but he chose to remain with his son and his patients in the hold of the ship. The International Committee of the Red Cross (ICRC) issued a warning to the British that prisoners might be on board the three ships, but on May 3, the British air force bombed the ships. Phillip survived the bombing and made it to shore, still a prisoner of the Germans. The next day the timely arrival of the British army saved him from execution. He was one of only about 50 prisoners out of 2,750 on the Thielbek who survived the bombing and its aftermath.

Sumner Jackson was not so lucky. He died in the bombing of the Thielbek. Toquette died in 1968. Phillip Jackson died in 2016.

Each of the Jacksons received the Croix de Guerre for their work in World War II. Sumner also received the US Medal of Freedom. Phillip and Toquette received the Legion d'Honneur.
