= Carrie Hall =

Carrie May Hall
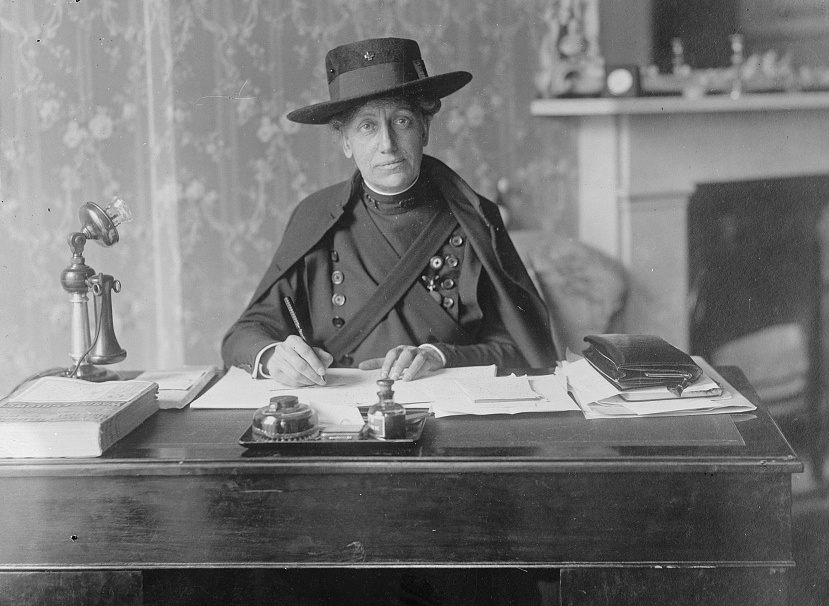
- Hall at her Desk as Chief Nurse with the American Red Cross in England 1918
- Born: July 5, 1874; Nashua, New Hampshire
- Died: November 17, 1963 (aged 89)
- Education: Massachusetts General Hospital School for Nurses
- Known for: board of National League of Nursing Education
- Medical career
- Institutions: Margaret Pillsbury Hospital, Peter Bent Brigham Hospital, Harvard Unit, American Red Cross in Great Britain

Carrie May Hall (July 5, 1874 – November 17, 1963) was a nurse who held several senior leadership positions in hospitals and within the American Red Cross during the First World War.

== Early life ==
Hall was born in Nashua, New Hampshire in 1874. She graduated from the Massachusetts General Hospital School for Nurses in 1904. After graduation, she was the superintendent of the Margaret Pillsbury Hospital in Concord, New Hampshire until 1911.

She was the first superintendent of nurses at Peter Bent Brigham Hospital, now named Brigham and Women's Hospital. The hospital has been affiliated with Harvard University and had a teaching hospital for both nurses and doctors. She was a principal of the Peter Bent Brigham School of Nursing for her entire career at the hospital. She formalized the curriculum for nurses, including expanding classroom education. The three-year course she created graduated its first class of five nurses in 1915.

== First World War ==
A unit of medical staff from Brigham Hospital, which was the nicknamed the "Harvard Unit", left for France on May 11, 1917. They were one of the first units sent over after America had entered the war just a month before on April 6, 1917. Hall was appointed Chief Nurse and Dr. Harvey Cushing was appointed as director of the unit. The unit was posted to the British Expeditionary Force. The unit took over a General Hospital 11 from the British. As the American Expeditionary Force had not yet arrived, Hall and her unit treated mostly British and Canadian soldiers. In a letter to the New England Red Cross, she described that her hospital could manage up to 700 soldiers within a 24-hour period and not be overwhelmed. In September 1917, Hall was managing 108 nurses and assistants in the base hospital and forward operating areas.

At the time, nurses were given no rank in the military structure. Hall wrote to her family where she vented frustration at the insubordination of other ranks towards her and other supervisors.

After nearly a year in her position, she was transferred away from the front-lines to become the chief nurse of American Red Cross in Great Britain. There she saw the war end, with the armistice being signed on November 11, 1918. In early January 1919, she was appointed as the chief nurse of the American Red Cross in France.

== After the war ==
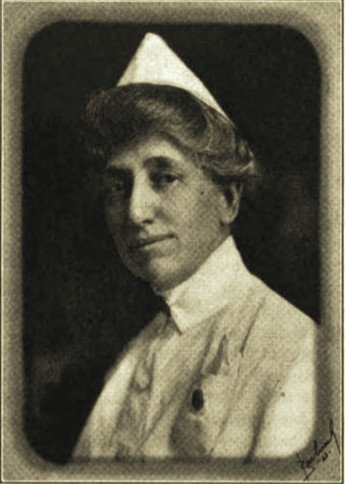
(1925)

She returned to her position of superintendent at Peter Bent Brigham Hospital. In addition to her role at the hospital, she worked on improving education across the country for nurses and also campaigned for better pay for nurses which included advocating for nurses pension plans. As part of her advocacy, she gave several addresses at various conferences and to nursing associations across the country. at several conferences including speaking at the Graduate Nurses' Association in DC.

She served on the board of the National League of Nursing Education for ten years starting 1922. She held the position of president from 1925 to 1927.

She retired from her position at Brigham hospital in 1937. In her honor, the hospital named a conference room for her. After her retirement in 1939, she was elected vice president of the Community Nursing Council of Boston.

She died on November 17, 1963.
