= American Base Hospital No. 238 =

Geography
- Location: Rimaucourt, France

Organisation
- Care system: Government
- Type: Military

Services
- Beds: 1000

History
- Founded: 1918

Links
- Lists: Hospitals in France

American Base Hospital No. 238 was an American military hospital formed in Rimaucourt, Department Haute Marne, France. This was the last hospital to be created during the First World War.

== History ==
At this hospital were the United States Army Nurse Corps (ANC). From the start of the war till its bloody finish late 1918 the ANC expanded from 403 nurses to 22,000.

The hospital took its personnel from Base Hospitals Nos. 52, 58, 59, and 64. Nine days after the November 11, 1918 cease-fire this base was set up as a special hospital for eye, ear, nose, and throat, skin and genitourinary diseases, and contained the central laboratory and morgue. It was the fifth base hospital to join the Rimaucourt hospital center, where it occupied a type A, 1,000-bed hospital.

Since it was created so late in the war effort the hospital was only opened for less than three months and during that time cared for 802 patients, closing its doors on January 26, 1919. It disbanded at Rimaucourt on February 15, 1919, "and Base Hospital No. 238, the last base hospital to be organized in the World War, ceased to exist."

== Personnel ==
Commanding Officers

- Lieut. Col. William E. Butler, M. C., November 18, 1918, to January 18, 1919.

Chief of surgical service

- Capt. N. Worth Brown, M. C.

Chief of medical service

- Maj. John J. Madigan, M. C.

== See also ==
- American Hospital of Paris
