= American Base Hospital No. 57 =

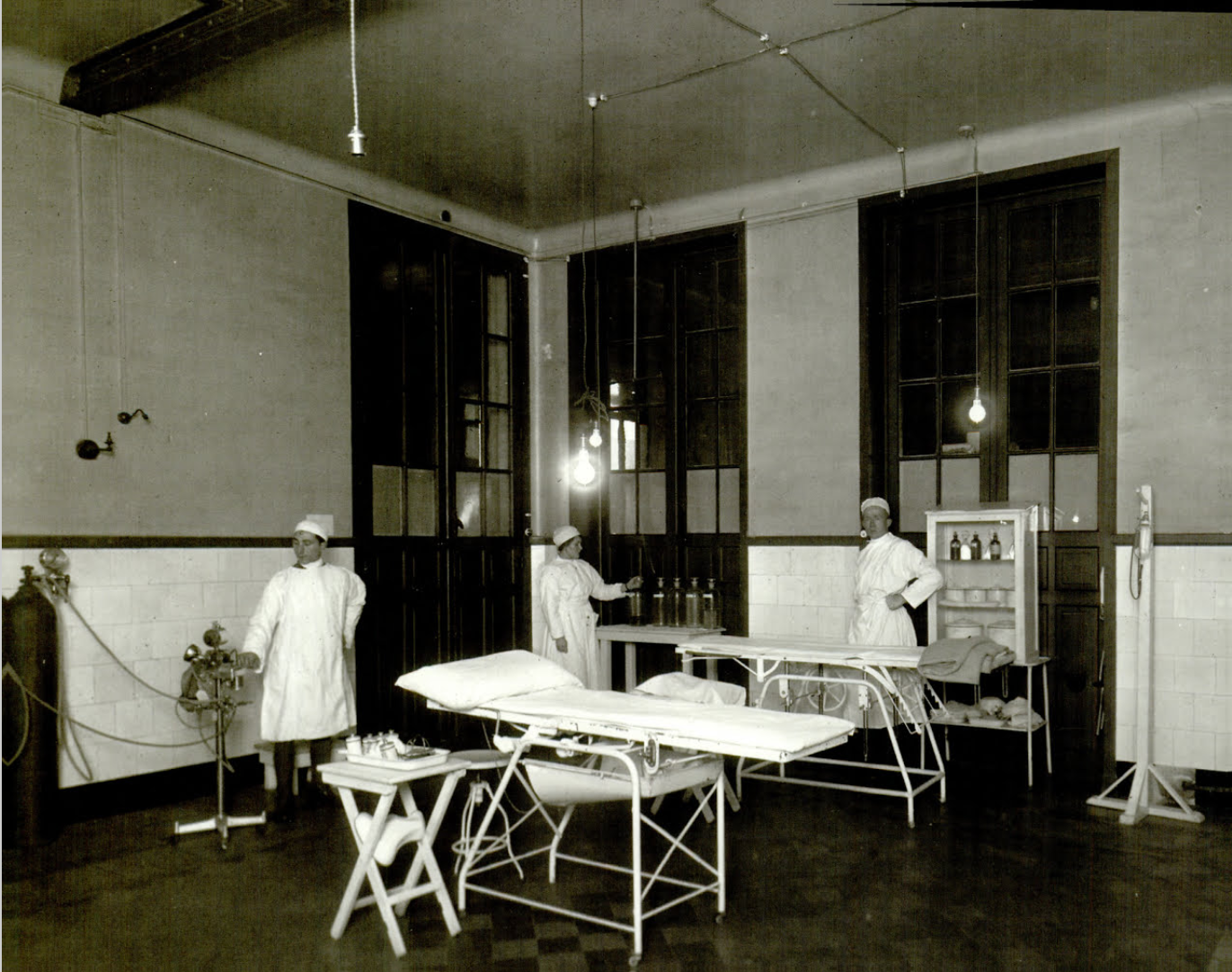
- Military Hospital No. 57 Surgical Assistants: Pte Nicholas Romeo, Alice Cahn, and Sergeant H.T. Aardweg

Geography
- Location: Paris, France

Organisation
- Care system: Government
- Type: Military

Services
- Beds: 1,800

History
- Founded: 1918

Links
- Lists: Hospitals in France

American Base Hospital No. 57 was an American military hospital formed in Georgia, United States. During the First World War the hospital moved to Paris, where a 1,800-bed hospital was set up to deal with war casualties.

== History ==
The United States declared war on Germany on April 6, 1917, during World War I. At Fort Oglethorpe, Georgia, the American military set up a Medical Officers Training Camp (MOTC) called Camp Greenleaf. Authorized in May 1917 until it was decommissioned in December 1918, the camp trained 6,640 officers and 31,138 enlisted men.

Among some units were the doctors and staff of Base Hospital No. 57. The members of the hospital were organized on April 2, 1918. Most of the men were drafted from Oil City, Pennsylvania. After training they shipped to Camp Merritt, New Jersey where they embarked on the Madingo on July 31, 1918. After stopping briefly in England they boarded the Londonderry and landed in France on August 21, 1918. They moved around France until on September 16, 1918 it was ordered to Paris where they took over 1,800 beds in a large school building in Paris. During the offensives of 1918, the hospital had as many as 2,000 patients. From taking over the Paris school in September 1918 to when the unit left France on August 13, 1919, the hospital unit treated 8,505 surgical and medical cases, and 7,292 dental cases.

Of the nineteen members of the Siamese Expeditionary Forces who lost their lives during their WWI deployment, eleven died in hospitals. In February 1919 five of these hospital-bound Thai soldiers died at the American Base Hospital No. 57 in Paris.

The unit returned to America on August 22, 1919, aboard the Kaiserin Augusta Victoria, and was demobilized soon after.

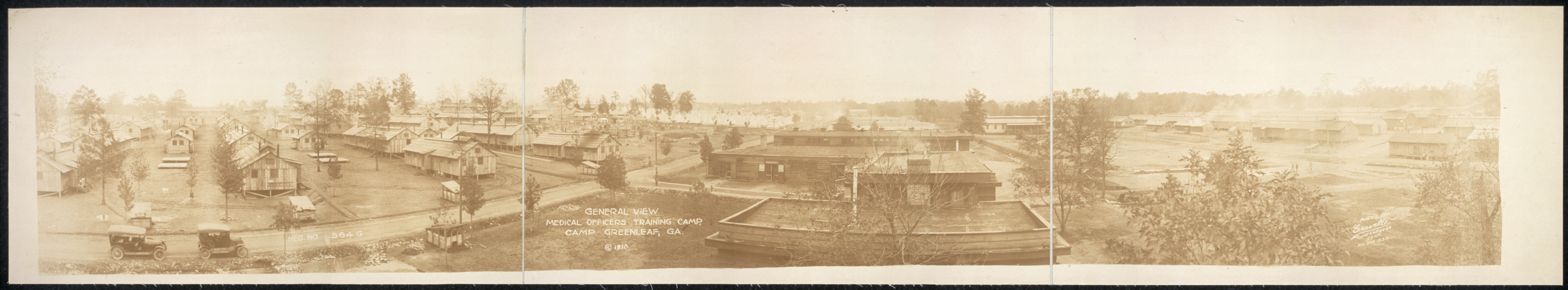
Medical Officers Training Camp, Camp Greenleaf – 1918

== Personnel ==
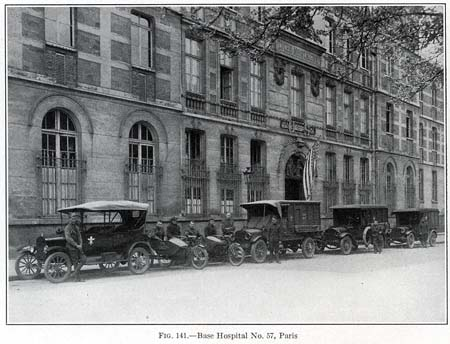
Outside American Base Hospital No. 57 in Paris during World War I

Commanding Officer

- Col. Edward C. Mitchell, M. C., April 2, 1918, to August 22, 1919

Chief of surgical service

- LC Frank D. Smythe, M. C.
- Maj. David M. Henning, M. C.
- LC Junius Lynch, M. C.

Chief of medical service

- LC Theodore L. Boutillier, M. C.

== See also ==
- American Hospital of Paris
- Sumner Jackson
