= Châtel-Guyon =

Châtel-Guyon Chastel Guion (Occitan)
- Commune
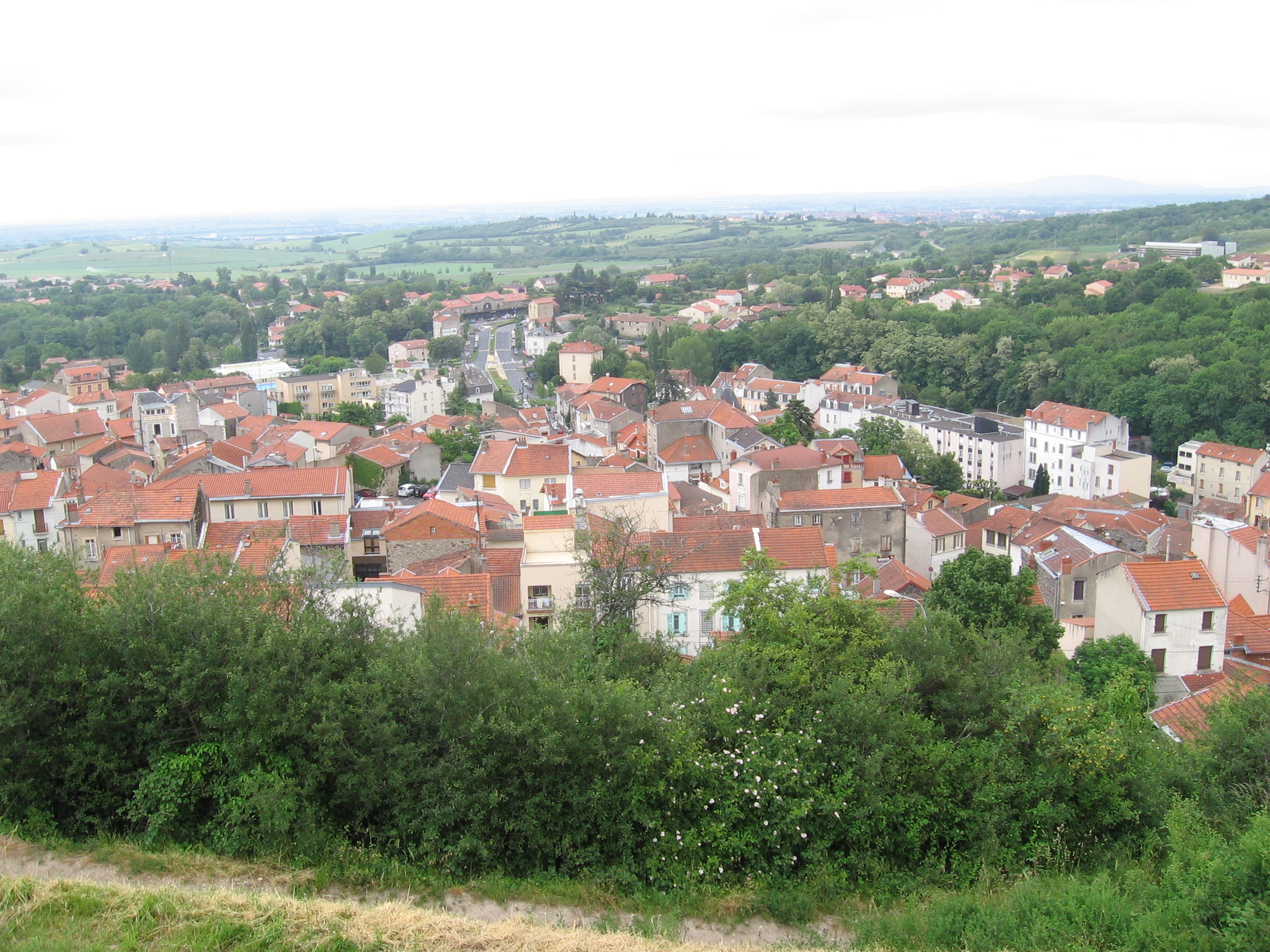
- Centre-ville de Châtel-Guyon

- Flag Coat of arms
- Location of Châtel-Guyon
- Location within France Location within Auvergne-Rhône-Alpes
- Coordinates: 45°55′24″N 3°03′54″E
- Country: France
- Region: Auvergne-Rhône-Alpes
- Department: Puy-de-Dôme
- Arrondissement: Riom
- Canton: Châtel-Guyon
- Intercommunality: CA Riom Limagne et Volcans

Government
  - Mayor (2020–2026): Frédéric Bonnichon
- Area^{1}: 14.06 km^{2} (5.43 sq mi)
- Highest elevation: 721 m (2,365 ft)
- Lowest elevation: 374 m (1,227 ft)
- Population (2023): 6,299
  - Density: 448.0/km^{2} (1,160/sq mi)
- Demonym: Châtelguyonnais or Brayauds
- Time zone: UTC+01:00 (CET)
  - Summer (DST): UTC+02:00 (CEST)
- INSEE/Postal code: 63103 /63140
- Website: www.chatel-guyon.fr
- ^{1} French Land Register data, which excludes lakes, ponds, glaciers > 1 km^{2} (0.386 sq mi or 247 acres) and river estuaries.

Châtel-Guyon (French: [ʃɑtɛl ɡɥijɔ̃]; Auvergnat: Chastel Guion) is a commune in the Puy-de-Dôme department in Auvergne-Rhône-Alpes in central France.

The name Châtel-Guyon comes from Castellum Guidonis, “Guy’s Castle”, after Guy II of Auvergne, the founder of the city.
Prior to June 2008 it was officially known as Châtelguyon, the change in the official styling being an adoption of its colloquial spelling, as, for example, used by Guy de Maupassant in his 1884 short story, "Le tic".

== First World War ==
At the time of the First World War, the population was approximately 2000 residents. It was an international destination for its baths and healing springs and attracted 30,000 visitors each summer. With the onset of war the majority of the hotels were closed. Many were used by the French government for housing French and Belgian refugees, as well as for hospitals by French and other forces. The American Expeditionary Force established Base Hospital No. 20 at Châtel-Guyon in May 1918. The hospital ceased operations in January 1919.

== Population ==
Historical population
Year	Pop.	±% p.a.
1968	3,652	—
1975	3,530	−0.48%
1982	4,386	+3.15%
1990	4,743	+0.98%
1999	5,241	+1.12%
2007	6,224	+2.17%
2012	6,100	−0.40%
2017	6,152	+0.17%
2023	6,299	+0.39%
Source: INSEE

== See also ==
- Communes of the Puy-de-Dôme department
