= American Base Hospital No. 36 =

American military hospital

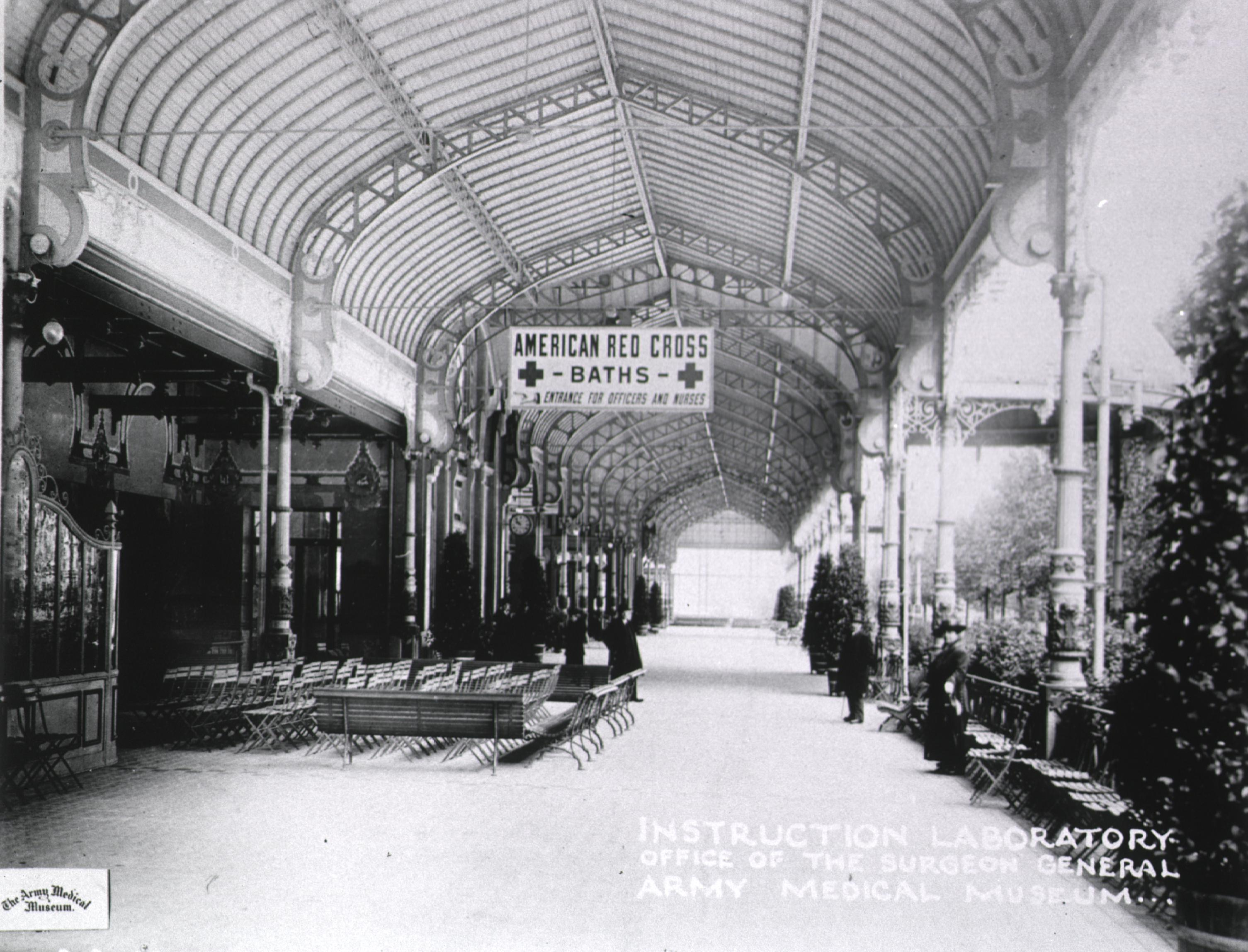
American Red Cross baths at Army Base Hospital No. 36

American Base Hospital No. 36 was an American military hospital formed in Detroit, Michigan. During the First World War, the hospital moved to Vittel in northeastern France where it was set up to deal with war casualties.

== History ==
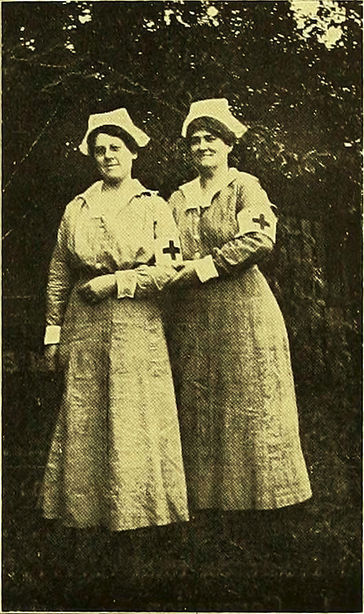
Nurses

Base Hospital No. 36 was organized in April, 1917, at the Detroit College of Medicine, and was mobilized at Detroit, August 23, 1917. The unit remained in training there for two months and sailed from New York City on the SS Orduña, October 27, 1917, arriving in France on November 11, 1917, and at Vittel, its permanent station, on November 17.

It was the first unit to arrive at Vittel, later forming a part of the Vittel-Contrexéville hospital center. It occupied 16 hotels and villas and had a total bed capacity of 1,650. The first patients were received December 8, 1917. During its activity, December 8, 1917, to January 14, 1919, the hospital cared for 14,114 medical and surgical cases, of which 1,376 were allied sick and wounded.

On January 14, 1919, all remaining patients were evacuated and the hospital ceased to function. The unit sailed from Saint-Nazaire, April 13, 1919, on the USS Rijndam, arriving at Newport News, Virginia, April 25, 1919, and was demobilized at Camp Custer, Kalamazoo County, Michigan, May 4, 1919. (Note: The statements of fact appearing herein are based on the History, Base Hospital No. 36, A. E. F. by the commanding officer of that hospital. The history is on file in the Historical Division, S. G. O., Washington, D. C.-Ed.)

== Personnel ==
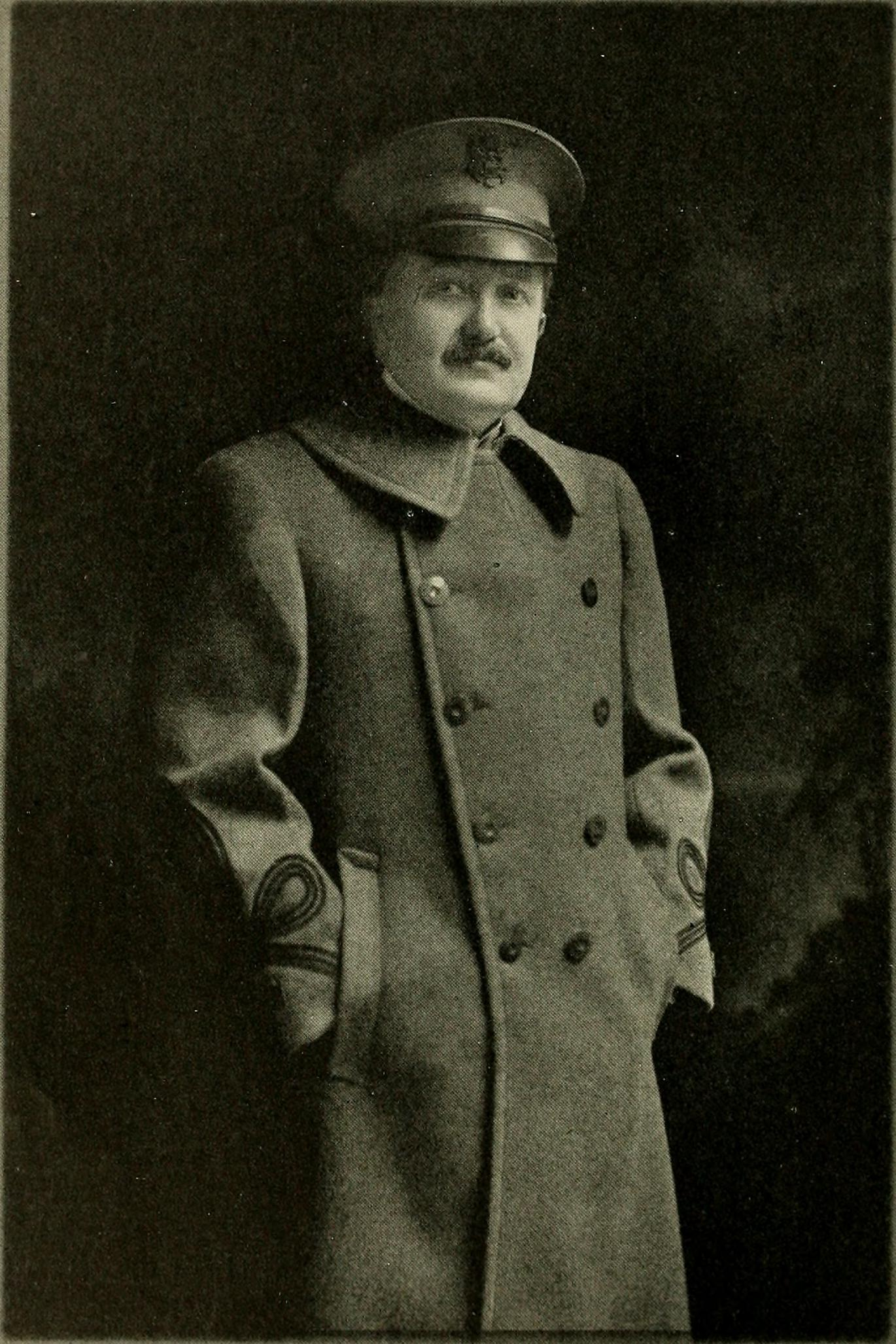
Burt R. Shurly (1917)

Commanding Officer

- Lieut. Col. Hiram A. Phillips, M. C., April 19, 1917, to September 13, 1918
- Lieut. Col. B. R. Shurly, M. C., September 14, 1918, to January 22, 1919
- Lieut. Col. Henry G. Berry, M. C., January 23, 1919, to May 4, 1919

Chief of Surgical Service

- Maj. Frank B. Walker, M. C.

Chief of Medical Service

- Maj. Theodore A. McGraw. M. C.
