= American Base Hospital No. 20 =

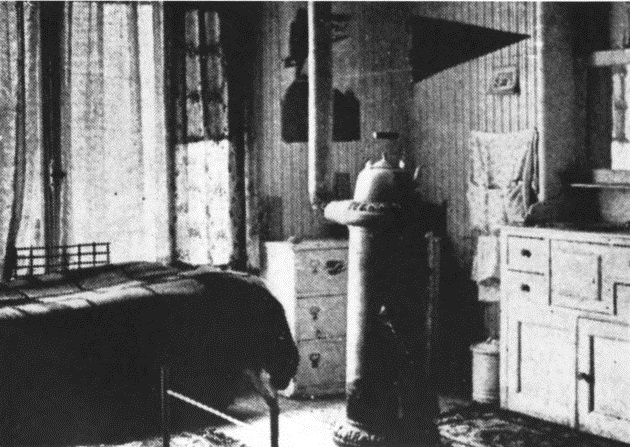
- Nurses quarters at Base Hospital No 20.

Geography
- Location: Châtel-Guyon, France

Organisation
- Care system: Government
- Type: Military

Services
- Beds: 2500

History
- Founded: 1916

Links
- Lists: Hospitals in France

Base Hospital No. 20, located in Châtel-Guyon, France, was one of the hundreds of Base Hospitals created to treat soldiers wounded during the First World War. It was created in 1916 by the University of Pennsylvania and served the American Expeditionary Forces (A.E.F.) until 1919.

== In the United States ==
While the United States had not yet formally joined the First World War, many were anticipating its inevitable entry. The University of Pennsylvania, in conjunction with the American Red Cross and the War Department, began organizing Base Hospital No. 20. in September 1916. Recruitment of personnel and raising of money to purchase equipment began in earnest. Penn Medical School Professor, Lt. Col. John B. Carnett, was put in charge of organizing the Surgical Operating Team No. 62 unit and set to work raising the US$25,000. (US$740,000 in 2025) required to purchase the minimum equipment required for a peacetime hospital. He helped secure finances for the equipment and recruited the medical staff. In April 1917, he became director of the hospital, when the United States entered the war. Simultaneously, the following staff were recruited to fill key roles: Col. Edward Martin, Director; Lt. Col. Eldridge L. Eliason, Chief of the Surgical Service; Lt. Col. George M. Piersol, Chief of the Medical Service; Edith B. Irwin, Chief Nurse; Lt. Col Thomas H. Johnson, as the Commanding Officer; and, Maj. Sherman M. Craiger, Quarter-master. In addition, sixty-five nurses and 153 enlisted men volunteered to serve the hospital. The enlisted men were under the charge of Maj. John H. Musser Jr. (son of John Herr Musser) and Maj. Philip F. Williams. Space was required to feed and house all of these people and the Athletic Association and Students' Training House at the University were given over for their use when they arrived in late 1917.

In preparation for their duties, a variety of training activities were undertaken. All personnel received at least five weeks hospital training as orderlies and anesthetists, as well as full instruction in practical first aid from Col. Eliason and were required to be able to apply splints, bandages, and dressings. Irwin volunteered for active duty with the U.S. Army Walter Reid Hospital in Washington, D.C. to familiarize herself with the operations of an army hospital prior to arrival in France.

After the war was formally declared, more equipment and funds were required. While the initial peacetime amount had been covered by a donation from the Harrison Fund, more would be required. Carnett and others were able to raise just over $110,000 USD, plus $40,000 (together $150,000 would be $4,440,000 in 2025) worth of equipment for the Hospital.

With personnel trained and all the necessary funds and equipment, the whole operation left the University for Camp Merritt, New Jersey on 1 April 1918. During their three weeks in New Jersey, they were joined by the nurses, dietitians and three civilian stenographers, who had been stationed at Ellis Island, and finally on 22 April, they all set sail on the USS Leviathan.

== In France ==
The voyage to France was uneventful, and they reached Brest on 2 May 1918. After a few days at Camp Pontanezen, they reached their final destination of Châtel-Guyon on May 7. The hospital had been assigned a number of hotels and other buildings and the first month was spent cleaning and repairing the buildings for use. They officially opened on 30 May 1918, which coincided with Decoration Day. Within the first two weeks they were able to accept 200 patients, and 500 after 4 weeks. Eventually, they would regularly treat over 2000.

Patients arrived on hospital trains, where they were zz. The patients were classified by disease or injury and organized in separate wards organized by medical, surgical, ophthalmological, laryngological and urological services, while a mobile team dealt with walking cases. The hospital treated battle wounds, exposure to mustard, phosgene, and chlorine gas, as well as contagious and infectious diseases. It was noted that their very first patient was suffering from influenza, and that the hospital overall suffered lightly from the fall flu. In addition to regular duties, they were one of three hospitals designated for supervising suspected tuberculosis cases.

The largest single number of patients to arrive in one day came on July 25 from the Battle of Château-Thierry (1918), 587 at the time. While the most patients at one time in the hospital was either 2153 or 2544 on 10 October 1918. During their time in operation they received wounded soldiers from the St. Mihiel salient, Verdun, Argonne, and others.

Even after hostilities concluded, No. 20 continued to tend to the wounded. At the end of 1918, there were still over a thousand people receiving treatment or recovering. The Hospital formally closed on 20 January 1918, when the last patient was discharged on 20 January 1919.

In the nine months that the hospital was operational, it received 8,703 patients, only 65 of whom died, plus the death of one staff member. The high rate of successful surgeries was attributed to the organization and efficiency of the operation.

Following the close of the hospital, the operation was dismantled and personnel were transferred or began to return home. The majority of the personnel left on the USS Freedom, 13 April 1919 and formally demobilized at Camp Dix, 5 May 1919.

== Detached duty units ==
The need for medical staff closer to the front prompted the forming of a number of smaller units from the staff at Base Hospital No. 20. The two major units were two Surgical Operating Teams, which consisted of a surgeon, their assistant, an anesthetist, a senior nurse, a second nurse, and two orderlies.

=== Surgical Operating Team No. 61 ===
Surgical Operating Team No. 61 went to Toul for instruction in war surgery on 8 June 1918, before reporting for active duty July 21, at ARC Military Hospital No. 1 at Neuilly. They rarely remained anywhere for more three or four weeks, working at Evacuation Hospital no. 5 at Chateau-Thierry, and then Field Hospital No. 162 in Chaligny, and finally Froidos, at Evacuation Hospital No. 10 until the war ended three weeks later. After which they returned to Base Hospital No. 20. The personnel for Team no. 61 were Lt. Col. Eliason, Maj. F. E. Keene, Maj. William Bates, Florence Williams, Sabina Landis, Sgt. Joseph Dougherty, and Pte. George Farabaugh. Keene and Williams were later replaced by Cpt. Thompson Edwards and Mary Hume respectively.

=== Surgical Operating Team No. 62 ===
The personnel of Surgical Operating Team No. 62 consisted of Col. John B. Carnett, Cpt. George M. Laws, Cpt. N.B. Goldsmith, Helen Pratt, Marie Bergstresser, Sgt. 1st class de Benneville Bell, and Pte. Rufus B. Jones. They departed Châtel-Guyon on 5 June 1918, and were first posted to Evacuation Hospital No. 1 on the Lorraine front, before joining Mobile hospital No. 2 at Bussy-le-Chateau on the Champagne front. In July they were working at Evacuation Hospital No. 4 at Ecury, before rejoining Mobile No. 2 on the Marne in August. Towards the end of August, the unit relocated to St. Mihiel, and moved on to the Argonne front in late September and remained there throughout the rest of the war. The team performed approximately 600 operations as well as dressing wounds and other medical procedures before returning to Châtel-Guyon.

=== Surgical Operating Team No. 562 ===
Cpt. George M. Laws and May Grenville were detached from Surgical Team No. 62 on September 3 to form No. 562 with personnel from other units. They served with Mobile Hospital No. 2, Exacupation Hospital No. 1, and Base Hospital No. 31 before returning to No. 20 at the end of November 1918.

=== Shock Team No. 116 ===
Shock Team No. 116 began with Field Hospital No. 27 and dealt with the severely wounded soldiers of the 3rd Division in Verdolet. For this work, the team, consisting of Maj. John Musser Jr., Grace MacMillan, Srg. F.G. Connor, and Pte. J. R. Arnold, received a letter of commendation from the Division commander. Following this posting, they ended up with the 32nd Division at Field Hospital No. 127, where they received the most seriously wounded and performed triage. Finally, from 4–8 September they were in the forest of Pierre-Fonds, before returning to Base Hospital No. 20.

=== Emergency Medical Team No. 116 ===
Departing from Châtel-Guyon on the 24th of September, the team arrived at Souilly, where they took over the Shock Ward of Evacuation Hospital No. 6. They held this post, working sometimes day and night, until November 26, before being relieved from duty and returning to Base Hospital No. 20. Cpt. George Strode, Elizabeth J. Coombs, and Cpl. Robert F. McMurtrie received commendations from the Chief Surgeon for their work.

== Personnel ==
Commanding Officers

- Col. Thomas H. Johnson, M. C., November 30, 1917, to July 28, 1918.
- Lieut. Col. George M. Piersol, M. C., July 29, 1918, to November 3, 1918.
- Lieut. Col. John M. Carnett, M. C., November 4, 1918, to demobilization.

Chief of surgical service

- Lieut. Col. Eldridge L. Eliason, M. C.
- Capt. John E. Kelly, M. C.

Chief of medical service

- Lieut. Col. George M. Piersol, M. C.
- Maj. J. H. Musser Jr., M. C.
