= American Hospital of Paris =

Coordinates: 48.8929°N 2.2725°E

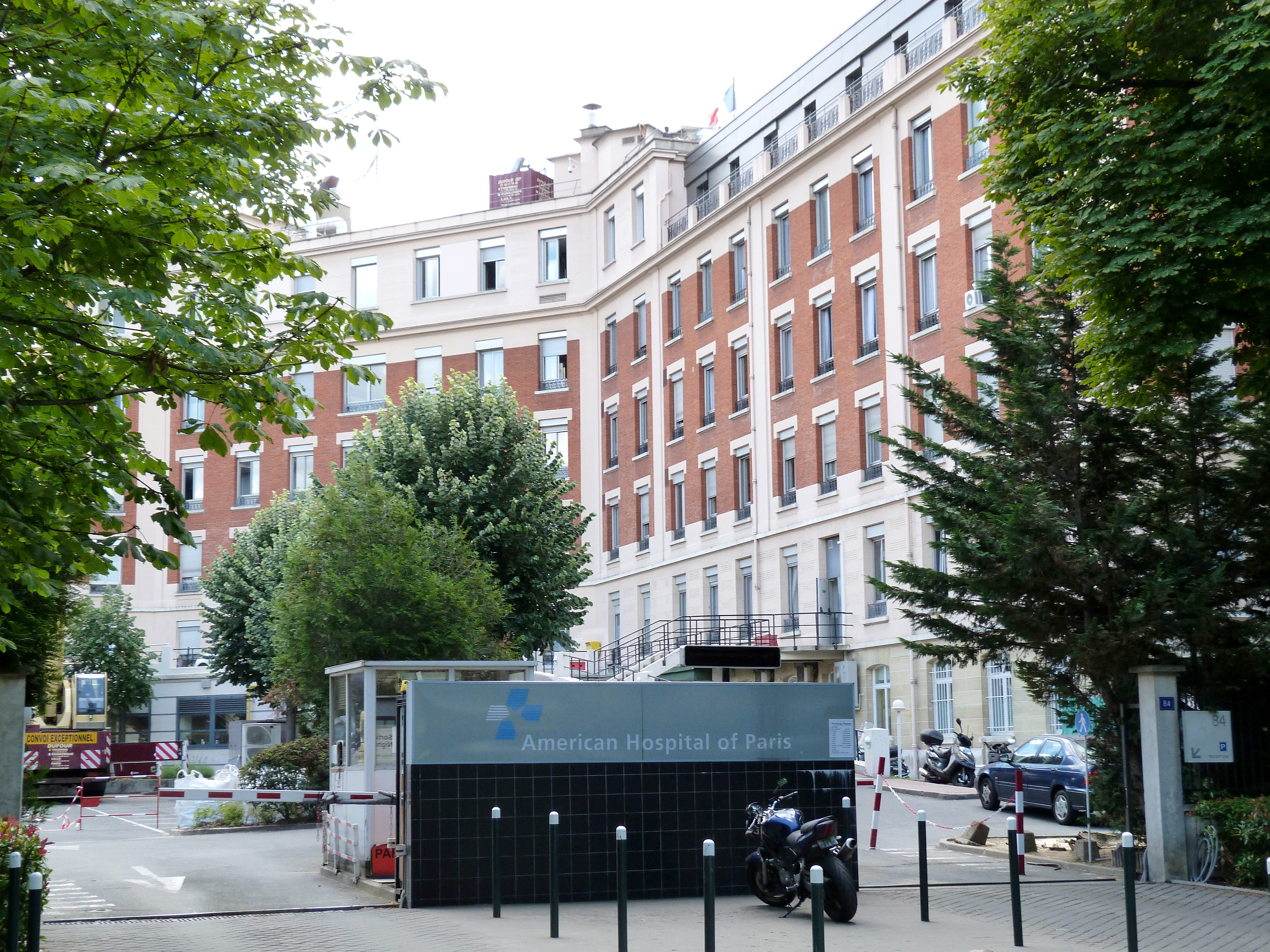
- American Hospital of Paris in 2011

Geography
- Location: Neuilly-sur-Seine, Paris, France

Organisation
- Care system: Private
- Type: District General

Services
- Emergency department: Yes
- Beds: 187

History
- Founded: 1906

Links
- Lists: Hospitals in France

The American Hospital of Paris (Hôpital américain de Paris), founded in 1906, is a private, not-for-profit, community hospital certified under the French healthcare system. Located in Neuilly-sur-Seine, in the western suburbs of Paris, France, it has 187 surgical, medical, and obstetric beds.

== History ==
The American Hospital of Paris was founded in 1906. Seven years later the United States Congress recognized the hospital under Title 36 of the United States Code on January 30, 1913. During World War I in March 1918, the French government decreed the hospital to be "an institution of public benefit", authorizing it to receive donations. The hospital is accredited by The Joint Commission (TJC), an independent organization that accredits hospitals in the United States; it is also accredited by France's Haute Autorité de santé (HAS). To this day, the American Hospital of Paris receives no government subsidies from either France or the United States. As a private, not-for-profit institution, it finances its operations through patient-care activities and philanthropic support from individual and corporate donors. Rock Hudson was treated at the hospital with a new drug for AIDS, a fact that was made public against his will by a hospital spokesperson.

== Facilities ==
The hospital has an extensive Ancillary Services Department, equipped with modern diagnostic and treatment equipment. The Outpatient Consultation Department's 150 physicians cover every major medical and surgical specialty. The Emergency Department physicians provide immediate care to patients 24 hours a day, 7 days a week. The medical staff includes over 500 physicians and surgeons. These private practitioners are credentialed by the Hospital through a thorough and strict selection process.

== Notable patients ==
- Olive Thomas, American silent film actress and model, died on September 10, 1920.
- Ahmad Shah Qajar, the last king of Qajar Iran, died on February 21, 1930
- Sara Delano Roosevelt, mother of President Franklin D. Roosevelt, hospitalized for pneumonia, influenza, May 1931. Discharged and sailed home to the United States.
- Jack Pickford, Canadian-American actor, film director and producer, died on January 3, 1933
- Pearl White, (1889–1938), American silent film actress (most notably in The Perils of Pauline serial), died in the hospital on August 4, 1938
- Raimu, French actor, died of a heart attack in an allergic reaction to an anesthetic on September 20, 1946
- Gertrude Stein, American novelist, poet and playwright, died in the hospital on July 27, 1946
- Georges Bernanos, French writer, died in the hospital on July 5, 1948
- Prince Edouard-Xavier de Lobkowicz, French aristocrat, was born in the hospital on October 18, 1960
- David Michael Danielson, American engineer and business executive, was born in the hospital on September 1, 1964
- Agneta Marianne Frieberg, Swedish fashion, commercial and runway model, died in the hospital on 10 May 1971
- Pierre Fresnay, French actor, died in the hospital on January 9, 1975
- Aristotle Onassis, Greek shipping magnate, died in the hospital on March 15, 1975
- Jean Gabin, French actor, died in the hospital on November 15, 1976
- Tino Rossi, French singer, died after being discharged from the hospital on September 29, 1983
- Paul Zweig, American critic, poet, memoirist, died in the hospital on August 29, 1984
- François Truffaut, French film director, died in the hospital on October 21, 1984
- Marcel Dassault, French aircraft industrialist, died in the hospital on April 17, 1986
- Bette Davis, American actress, died in the hospital on October 6, 1989
- Pamela Harriman, United States Ambassador to France, died in the hospital on February 5, 1997
- Barbara, French singer, died in the hospital on November 24, 1997
- Jan Stenbeck, Swedish entrepreneur, one of Sweden's wealthiest individuals, died in the hospital on August 19, 2002.
- Françoise Giroud, French journalist, screenwriter, writer and politician, died in the hospital on January 19, 2003
- Philippe de Broca, French filmmaker, died in the hospital on November 26, 2004
- Annabel Buffet, Actress, writer, and singer, died in the hospital on August 3, 2005
- Angus Maddison, British economist, died in the hospital on April 24, 2010
- Robert Laffont, French publisher, died in the hospital on May 19, 2010
- Rosy Varte, French actress, died in the hospital on January 14, 2012
- Jean-Luc Delarue, French television presenter and producer, died in the hospital on August 23, 2012
- Gholamreza Pahlavi, Persian prince, died on May 7, 2017
- France Gall, French singer, died in the hospital on January 7, 2018
- Karl Lagerfeld, German creative director, fashion designer, artist, photographer and caricaturist, died in the hospital on February 19, 2019
- Joachim Yhombi-Opango, Congolese former President of the Republic of the Congo, died in the hospital from COVID-19 on March 30, 2020
- Kenzō Takada, Japanese-French fashion designer, died at the hospital from COVID-19 on 4 October 2020
- Pierre Cardin, Italian-French fashion designer, died in the hospital on December 29, 2020
- Ibrahim Mbombo Njoya, Cameroonian royal and politician, died from COVID-19 in the hospital on September 27, 2021
- Françoise Hardy, French singer, actress, and composer, died in the hospital on 11 June 2024

== See also ==
- American Base Hospital No. 57
- Sumner Jackson
