= Karmanos =

Karmanos is a surname. Notable people with the surname include:

- Barbara Ann Karmanos, breast cancer victim, wife of Peter Karmanos
  - Karmanos Cancer Institute in Detroit, U.S., named after Barbara
- Peter Karmanos Jr. (born 1943), American business executive
- Danialle Karmanos (born 1973), American philanthropist and community activist
