= Thomas Thewes =

Thomas Thewes (December 9, 1931 – September 28, 2008) was an American entrepreneur and businessman. He was vice chairman and a co-founder of Compuware Corporation along with Peter Karmanos and Allen Cutting.

Thewes was a co-owner of three hockey teams, including the Carolina Hurricanes (NHL), the Plymouth Whalers (OHL), and the Florida Everblades (ECHL). He won the Stanley Cup with the Hurricanes in 2006.

Thewes was a graduate of the University of Detroit. He and his wife, Beverly, resided in metropolitan Detroit and had six children. Thewes was a benefactor to several philanthropic interests. He died after a two-year fight with leukemia.
