= Danialle Karmanos =

American journalist (born 1973)

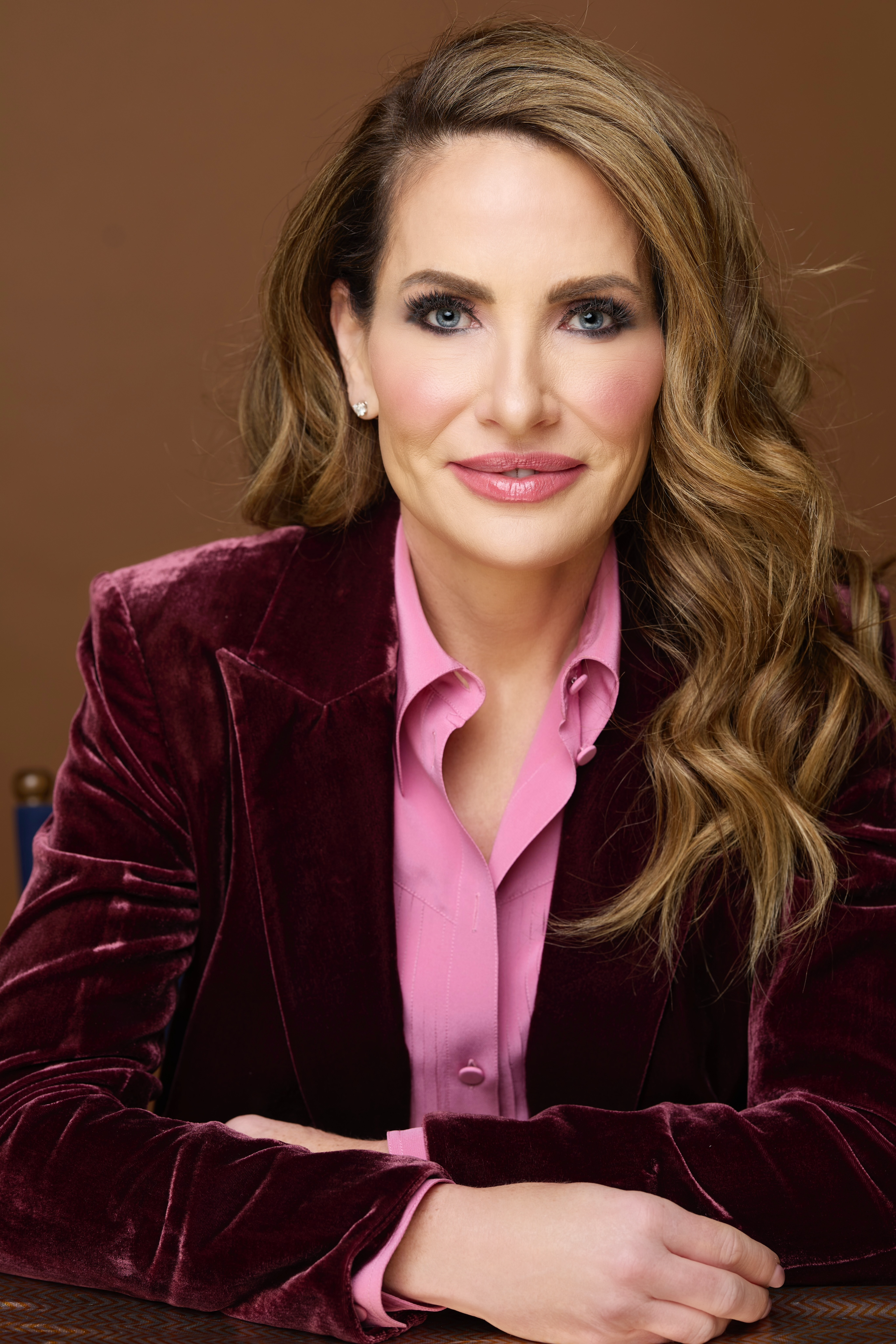
- Karmanos in 2025
- Born: Danialle Tynan

Danialle Karmanos is an American philanthropist, technology executive and CEO of MadDog Technology.

== Early life and education ==
Born in 1973, Karmanos grew up in Michigan in the Dearborn area. She graduated from Dearborn High School in 1991. She received her undergraduate degree from Wayne State University in 1998.

== Career ==
Karmanos' early work was first as a spokesperson for the auto industry. From 2002 to 2005, Karmanos produced and directed concept car reveals for North American International Auto Show. In 2006, she wrote, co-produced, and directed the award-winning "I Am Detroit" for Compuware Corporation.

She is primarily known for her work helping people in the Detroit area, but in recent years she has taken on the role as a technology executive and investor. In 2009, she told the New York Times that she woke up each day asking how she can help the area. In 2005, Karmanos founded Danialle Karmanos Work It Out (DKWIO), and ten years later she talked about how the program was reducing bullying in schools. In 2015, Karmanos and her husband, Peter Karmanos Jr., established the Karmanos Center for Natural Birth at William Beaumont Hospital in Royal Oak, Michigan. That same year, she donated funds to Wayne State University to establish a journalism program. In 2017, Karmanos founded The Cuddlers, a volunteer-based movement started at Children's Hospital of Michigan to cuddle and comfort hospitalized infants and children.

Karmanos has been a columnist for Styleline Magazine and a guest blogger for Metromodemedia.com. She is the author of the hardcover book about her husband entitled, Pete Karmanos – A Life in Progress.

Karmanos was elected to the Wayne State University Board of Governors and served from 2011 to 2013. She was named by Michigan Governor Jennifer Granholm to serve on the Michigan Film Office Advisory Council in 2008. Karmanos currently serves on the board of trustees for the College for Creative Studies, and is a founding member, board member and former Chair of the Museum of Contemporary Art Detroit. Karmanos is also a member of the Leadership Advisory Board of the A. Alfred Taubman Medical Research Institute at the University of Michigan and serves on the Board Development Committee of the Girl Scouts of Southeastern Michigan.

Since 2016, she has served on the Board of Trustees at Detroit Country Day School in Bloomfield Hills, Michigan. She hosted and produced the podcast Karama Has Spoken for SEEN Magazine. In 2023, she founded Danialle’s Clubhouse in Birmingham, Michigan, a community space offering programming focused on social connection and engagement for women.

== Awards and honors ==
In 2025, HOUR Detroit named Karmanos Detroiter of the Year.

Danialle Karmanos Work It Out (DKWIO), which Karmanos founded in 2005, is now run by Wayne State University, and according to HOUR Detroit, has helped more than 40,000 kids in and around Detroit.

In 2025, Karmanos received the Greek America Foundation Lifetime Supporter Award.

In 2018, Karmanos received an honorary Doctor of Humane Letters degree from Hellenic American University.

Karmanos has also received numerous awards for her community service, philanthropy and contributions to the metropolitan Detroit community. She received the American Heart Association's "Cor Vitae Award" for community service; the Matilda R. Wilson Award from Boys & Girls Clubs of Southeastern Michigan; the MBPA Women and Leadership's "Distinguished Leadership Award for Philanthropy;" and the Greater Wayne County Chapter of The Links' "Innovator in Health and Wellness" award.

In 2007, Karmanos was named to Crain's Detroit Business "40 Under 40" list of young achievers in recognition of her career achievements.

== Personal life ==
Karmanos married Peter Karmanos Jr., founder of Compuware, in 2005. The couple have four sons.

== Philanthropy ==
Karmanos partnered with Detroit Country Day School to establish the DCDS XR studio and podcast facility, a state-of-the-art multimedia production space incorporating extended reality (XR), LED video walls, and virtual production technology. She contributed $3 million toward the project.

Karmanos is the Lead Advisor for Strategic Development at the College for Creative Studies Fashion Design Advisory Council.

In addition to DKWIO and the Karmanos Center for Natural Childbirth, Karmanos and her husband have provided significant financial support to the Karmanos Cancer Institute in Detroit, Wayne State University's journalism program, the College for Creative Studies, the Detroit Zoo, Alzheimer's Association, Michigan Humane Society, Dutch Symphony Orchestra, Grace Centers of Hope, Girl Scouts of the USA and the Greek America Foundation.
