= Statue of Phil Esposito =

Coordinates: 27°56′33.8″N 82°27′9.9″W

The Phil Esposito Statue is a commemorative bronze work created in honor of NHL Hall-of-Famer, Phil Esposito, for his role in co-founding the Tampa Bay Lightning franchise. It was unveiled on December 31, 2011, at the Benchmark International Arena in Tampa, FL.

The statue portrays Esposito dressed in a business suit, allegedly at his request, because he came into co-founding the Tampa Bay Lightning as a business man, and not a player (Stuart, 2012). Esposito holds a hockey stick, adorns each hand with his two Stanley Cup rings, and wears a tie with the Tampa Bay Lightning logo.

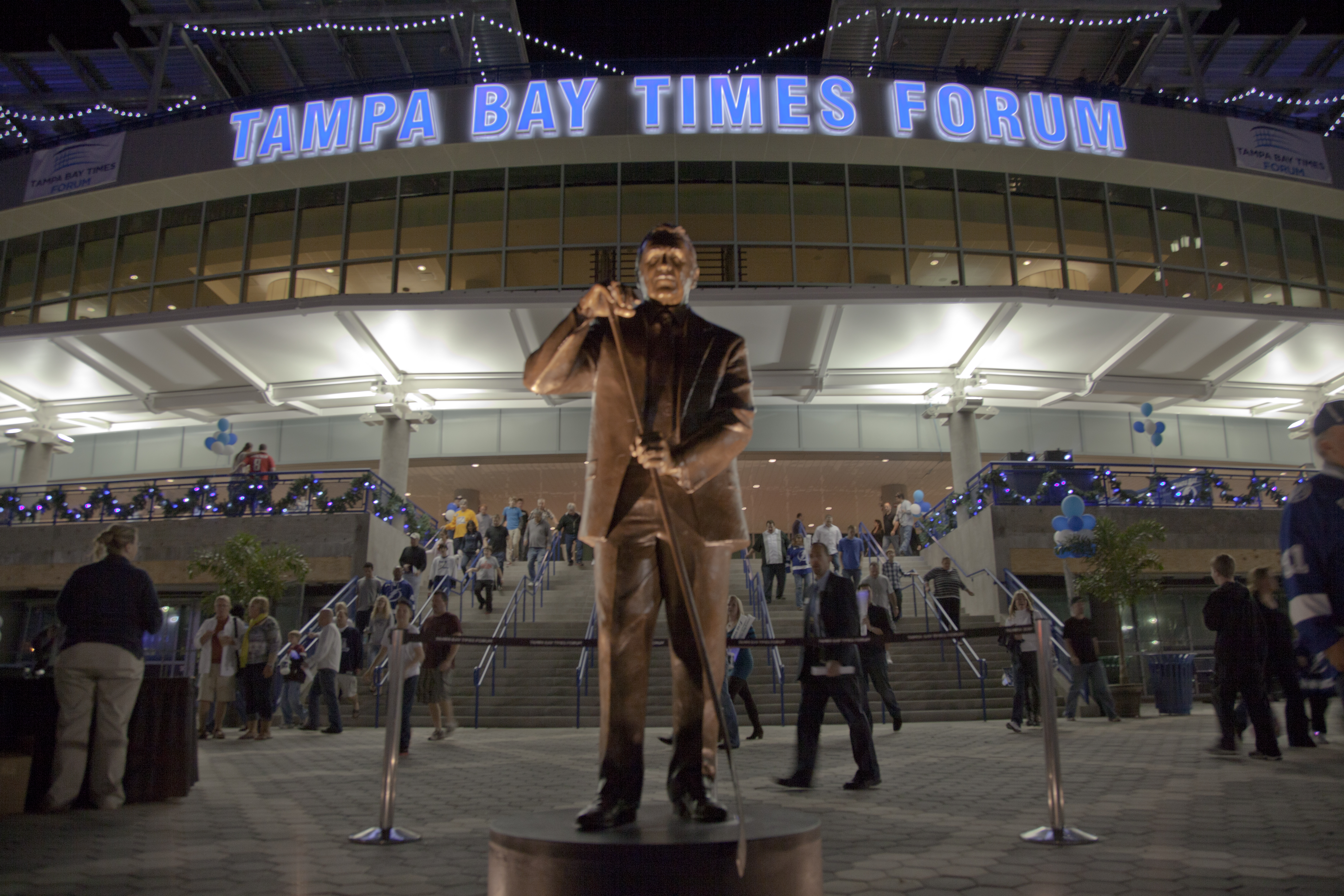
The Phil Esposito Statue at Benchmark International Arena, December 31, 2011.

== Origin ==
The original idea for the statue derived from Tampa attorney and avid Tampa Bay Lightning fan, Stephen K. Stuart, who felt that Esposito deserved to be commemorated for his role in getting Tampa a hockey team. Stuart reported, “What impressed me was how he fought to get this franchise, and I don't think anyone else could have gotten it here if it wasn't for his hockey pedigree." With the help of private donors, Stuart raised $60,000 to create the statue.

== Creation ==
Production of the statue began in 2009, and it took nearly 3 years to complete, (Stuart, 2012). Stuart commissioned sculptor, Steven Dickey, of Dickey Studios in Tampa, to produce the statue. Dickey utilized a process known as the lost wax casting to cast the statue, (Stuart, 2012).

Richard Frignoca of Bronzart Foundry, Inc. in Sarasota, bronzed the statue. Additionally, Jeff Downing of Downing Design in Tampa, created the hockey puck on which the statue rests, (Stuart, 2012).
