= Phil Esposito =

Canadian ice hockey player and executive (born 1942)

Phil Esposito OC
- Hockey Hall of Fame, 1984
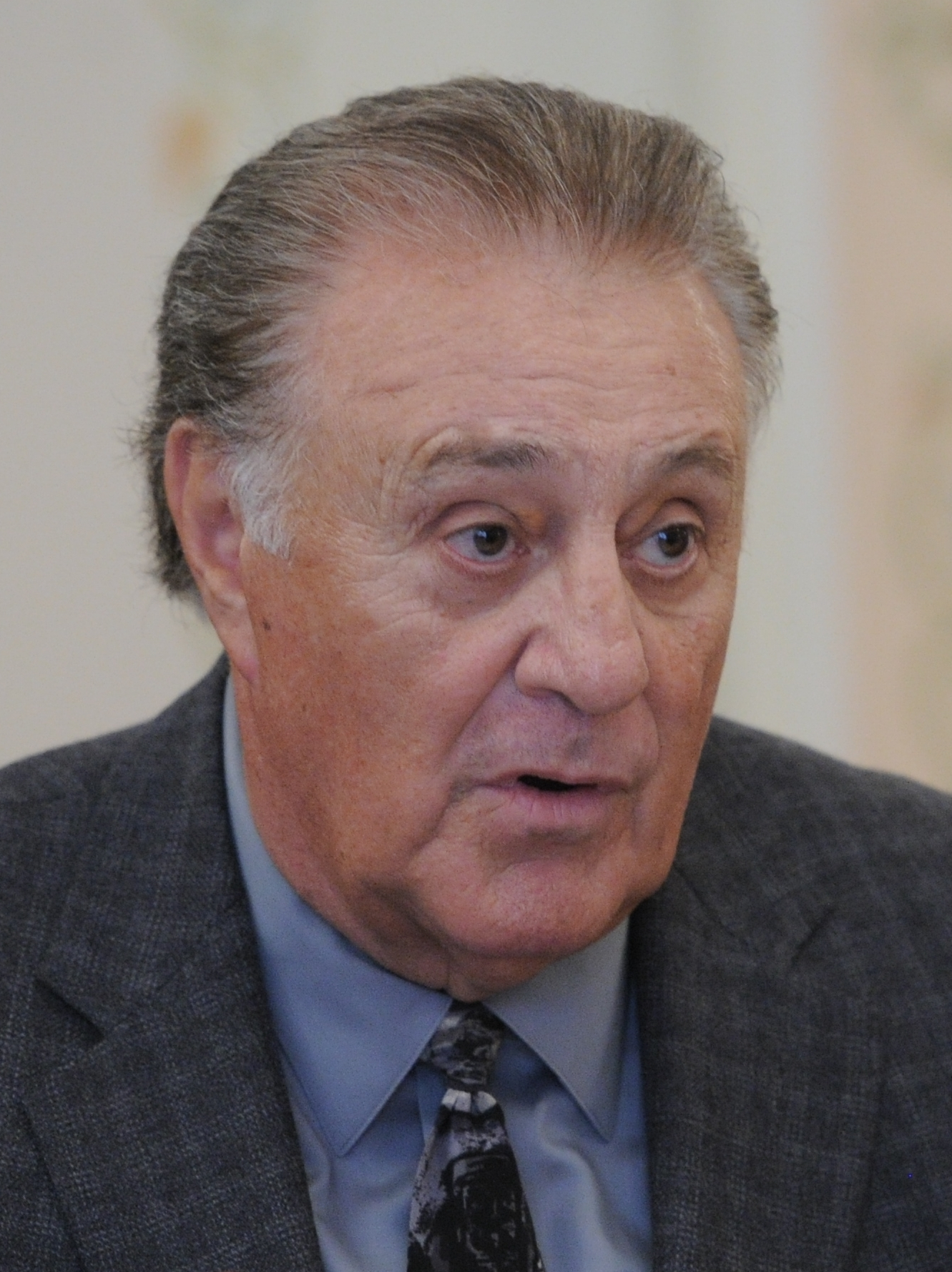
- Esposito in 2012
- Born: February 20, 1942 (age 84) Sault Ste. Marie, Ontario, Canada
- Height: 6 ft 1 in (185 cm)
- Weight: 205 lb (93 kg; 14 st 9 lb)
- Position: Centre
- Shot: Left
- Played for: Chicago Black Hawks; Boston Bruins; New York Rangers
- National team: Canada
- Playing career: 1963–1981
Medal record
Representing Canada
Men's ice hockey
Canada Cup
| Gold medal – first place | 1976 Canada | Ice hockey |

Philip Anthony Esposito OC (/ˌɛspəˈziːtoʊ/ ESP-ə-ZEE-toh, Italian: [eˈspɔːzito]; born February 20, 1942) is a Canadian former professional ice hockey player, coach and executive, and current broadcaster for the Tampa Bay Lightning. A member of the Hockey Hall of Fame, he played 18 seasons in the National Hockey League (NHL) for the Chicago Black Hawks, Boston Bruins, and New York Rangers, winning two Stanley Cups with Boston.

He is considered one of the greatest players of all time, and is the older brother of Hall-of-Fame goaltender Tony Esposito. He became the first player to score more than 100 points in a season, with 126 in 1968–69, a feat he achieved a further five times. In 1970–71 Esposito also became the first player to score 50 goals in five consecutive seasons, including the then records of 76 goals and 152 points the same year. Altogether, he won the Art Ross Trophy as the leading point scorer five times, led the league in goals six times, was voted the Hart Trophy for MVP twice, and was named as a first team All-Star centre six times.

After retiring as a player, Esposito served as head coach and general manager for the Rangers for two seasons. In 1991, he and brother Tony co-founded the Tampa Bay Lightning, the first NHL team in Florida. Phil Esposito served as the franchise's first president and general manager until 1998; he now serves as the Lightning's radio colour commentator.

Esposito was named one of the '100 Greatest NHL Players' in history in 2017, and the ninth-best player of all time by The Athletic in 2023. His #7 jersey was retired by the Bruins on December 3, 1987, and there is a statue in his likeness at Tampa Bay's Benchmark International Arena.

== Early life ==
Phil Esposito was born on February 20, 1942, in Sault Ste. Marie, Ontario, Canada, to his parents Pat and Frances, who were both of Italian descent. His father's parents immigrated to Canada at the beginning of 20th century. His father quit school as a teenager to work in Sault Ste. Marie's steel mills, and later worked as a labourer and a welder, and married Frances in 1941. He built the family's first house for $3,000 and paid it off six years later. Esposito grew up with his sisters Mary and Janice and his brother Tony. The Esposito brothers started playing hockey together at an early age on frozen ponds, outdoor rinks, and local community leagues.

== Playing career ==
=== Minor league ===
Esposito signed with the Chicago Black Hawks as a teenager and was assigned to the Sarnia Legionnaires Jr. 'B' hockey team for the 1960–61 season. In just 32 games with the Legionnaires, he scored 47 goals and 61 assists, for 108 points - a scoring pace of 3.3 points per game. He scored 12 points in one playoff game as the Legionnaires advanced to the Western Ontario final before being eliminated. After a sparkling junior season with the St. Catharines Teepees of the Ontario Hockey Association in 1961–62, Esposito spent two seasons with Chicago's minor league affiliate, the St. Louis Braves, scoring 90 points in his first season and 80 points in only 46 games in his second. He was then named to the OHA-Jr. Second All-Star Team.

=== Chicago Black Hawks (1963–1967) ===
Midway through the 1963–64 NHL season, Esposito was called up to the parent Black Hawks to make his NHL debut. He appeared in 27 games and scored his first NHL goal on January 25, 1964 versus the Detroit Red Wings. Centreing for Bobby Hull beginning in the 1964–65 season, he proved himself a quality playmaker, twice finishing amongst the league-leading scorers over the next three seasons. In 1964–65 he appeared in 70 games scoring 20+ goals for the first time, along with 32 assists for 55 total points. Esposito appeared in 13 playoff games scoring 3 goals and 3 assists as the Black Hawks reached the 1965 Stanley Cup Final, in which they were defeated 4–3 by Montreal. Esposito produced similar numbers the following season scoring 27 goals and 26 assists in 69 games, as the Black Hawks were eliminated in the first round of the playoffs. His final season with the Black Hawks came in 1966-67 during which he scored 21 goals and 41 assists in 69 games, as the Black Hawks again lost in the first round.

=== Boston Bruins (1967–1975) ===
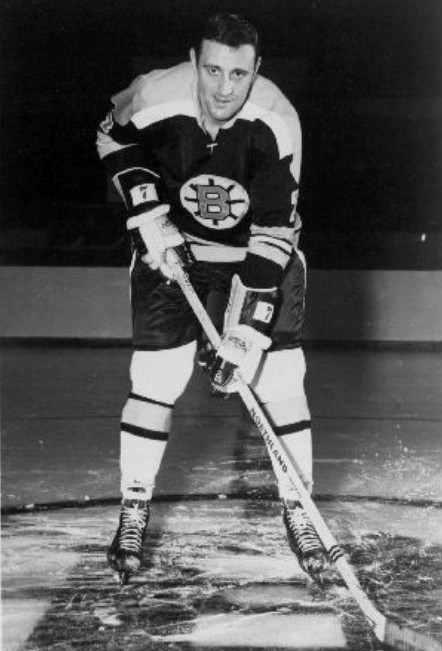
Esposito with the Boston Bruins in 1969.

In 1967, Esposito was dealt with Ken Hodge and Fred Stanfield to the Boston Bruins in a blockbuster trade. While Hodge and Stanfield rose to become stars in Boston, Esposito blossomed into the greatest scorer of his day. In his first year with the club, Esposito's play improved greatly; he appeared in 74 games and had his first 30+ goal season, scoring 35 goals along with 49 assists. As a result he led the Bruins in all 3 categories of goals, assists and points. This resulted in him being named to the NHL second All-Star team for the first time in his career. In addition he helped the Bruins break their 8 year playoff drought. However they were swept by the Montreal Canadiens in the first round.

A 6-foot-1, 215-pound, strong man who seldom hid his emotions, Esposito was nearly unstoppable when he maneuvered in the slot. He'd find or fight for some free ice against the frustrated defenders trying to stop him, and figure out a way to get the puck on his stick. As soon as it was there, he sent it goalward. One of his best attributes was his shot. During his time with the Bruins he benefitted from his point-blank positioning, especially on the power play. Being a big player for his day, and even as he withstood a flogging from penalty-killing stick swingers, he would still get his shots in, with 249 going in, which made him one of the greatest power-play scorers in league history. Esposito play style has led to him being described as hockey's version of Willie Sutton, the prolific American bank robber. Asked why he robbed banks, Sutton said, "Because that's where the money is." As for Esposito he parked his hulking frame in front of the opponent's net because that's where his goals were scored.

The following year, 1968–69 season, Esposito had both a breakout and historic year; in 74 games Esposito scored 49 goals and 77 assists for 126 total points, making him the first player in NHL history to score 100 points in a season. Esposito scored the historic 100th point in a game against the Pittsburgh Penguins on March 2, 1969 when he scored 2 goals in a 4-0 Bruins victory. For this feat, Esposito ended up playing in his first NHL all star game and was named to the NHL first All-Star team for the first time as well. In addition, Esposito took home the Art Ross Trophy as the league's top scorer, and also won the Hart Memorial Trophy as the league's most valuable player. The Bruins defeated The Rangers in the first round, but despite Esposito’s 18 point postseason, the Bruins once again lost to Montreal 4-2 in the semifinals.

During his prime, Esposito centered one of the most renowned forward lines in history, featuring Ken Hodge on his right wing and Wayne Cashman on his left. Esposito continued to put up sensational numbers alongside fellow superstar Bobby Orr. During the 1969–70 season Esposito appeared in 76 games and finished just one point shy of a second consecutive 100 point campaign, scoring 43 goals and 56 assists. For his efforts, he was once again selected to the NHL first All-Star team. The Bruins once again made the postseason and Esposito led the way during the postseason, scoring a career high 13 playoff goals along with 14 assists in 14 games. The Bruins defeated both New York and Chicago to reach the 1970 Stanley Cup Final where they defeated the St Louis Blues to secure Boston's first cup in 29 years.

During 1970–71, Esposito shattered the record for most goals in a season: in 78 games he averaged nearly a goal a game, scoring 76 goals. This mark stood until 1982, when Wayne Gretzky scored his 77th, 78th and 79th goals against the Buffalo Sabres on February 24, 1982, at the Buffalo Memorial Auditorium. Esposito was on hand to present the game puck to Gretzky. Esposito also set the single-season point-scoring record in 1971, as along with his 76 goals, he tallied 76 assists for 152 total points, a mark later superseded by Gretzky's 215 points in 1985-86. Only four others have reached the 150 point plateau — Mario Lemieux (four times), Steve Yzerman, Bernie Nicholls and Connor McDavid — and only Gretzky, Lemieux, Brett Hull, Teemu Selänne and Alexander Mogilny have matched or bettered Esposito's 76 goals in a season.

The 1970 season also saw Esposito shatter the single-season mark for shots on goal, tallying 550. Only one other player has come within 100 shots of this record, Alexander Ovechkin in 2008–09, in a season that was four games longer than when it was set. With Esposito scoring 152 points, his fellow teammates also put up incredible numbers: Bobby Orr (with 139), Johnny Bucyk (116) and Ken Hodge (105). The group finished 1–2–3–4 in league scoring, the first time in NHL history the season's top four scorers all played for one team. Once again, Esposito received numerous accolades for his performance, earning his second Art Ross Trophy, a third NHL first All-Star team selection, and his first Lester B. Pearson Award as the league's most outstanding player in the regular season. Despite the tremendous regular season, Esposito and the Bruins were upset by the Canadians in the first round of the playoffs 4-3.

On August 31, 1971, Esposito signed a lucrative four-year contract extension with the Bruins, making him one of the highest-paid players in the NHL at over $100,000 per season following a record-breaking 76-goal season.

The next year, during the 1971–72 season, Esposito continued his tremendous scoring average; in 76 games, Esposito scored 66 goals and 67 assists for 133 total points. This resulted in Esposito, along with teammate Bobby Orr, becoming the first players in league history to have back to back 100+ point seasons. Esposito earned his third Art Ross Trophy and his fourth first All-Star team selection. The Bruins finished that season with the league's best record, and once again Esposito put up big numbers during their postseason run, scoring 9 goals and a postseason-best 15 assists in 15 games, as the Bruins reached the 1972 Stanley Cup Final vs. New York. After the Rangers staved off elimination in game five, Esposito said famously, "If the Rangers think they're going to beat us in the next two games, they're full of 'Park' spelled backwards," referring to Rangers star defensemen Brad Park. Sure enough, the Bruins put them away in game six at Madison Square Garden, winning their second Stanley cup in three years.

During the 1972-73 season, Esposito had a third consecutive 100+ point season. In 78 games, he scored 55 goals and 75 assists for 130 total points. This resulted in a fifth All Star game appearance, fifth first All-Star team selection and his fourth Art Ross Trophy. However, Esposito only appeared in 2 postseason games, as the Bruins were defeated by New York in the first round.

During the 1973–74 season, Esposito scored his 1000th career point on February 15, 1974 vs the Detroit Red wings. He would go on to have another explosive year: in 77 games Esposito would score 66 goals and tally 76 assists for 145 total points. Esposito's 145 points, combined with teammate Orr's 122 points, Hodge's 105 points, and Cashman's 89 points, meant the Bruins again finished 1–2–3–4 in league scoring, the only other time in NHL history the season's top four scorers all played for one team. Esposito would win his fifth and final Art Ross Trophy, along with the Hart Memorial Trophy as the league's MVP for a second time. The Bruins once again finished with the league's best record, and during the postseason, Esposito scored 14 points (9 goals and 5 assists) in 16 games, as the Bruins reached the 1974 Stanley Cup finals. However, they were defeated by Philadelphia 4-2.

The following year in 1974-75, Esposito became just the 6th player in NHL history to score his 500th career goal. The goal came in a 5-4 win over the Detroit Red Wings on December 22, 1974. Three days prior on December 19, Esposito tied the Bruins record for most points in a game (3 goals, 4 assists) in a 11-3 win over the New York Rangers. Esposito would go on to his fifth consecutive (and final) 100+ point season, as in 79 games he scored 61 goals and 66 assists for 127 total points. He also finished as the league leader in goal scoring for a fifth and final time. However, the Bruins were eliminated in the first round of the playoffs.

Esposito was named to the NHL's first All-Star team six consecutive times (from 1969 to 1974), and won the Hart Memorial Trophy as the NHL's most valuable player in 1969 and 1974. His Boston fans, celebrating his scoring touch during his heyday, displayed bumper stickers that read, "Jesus saves, Espo scores on the rebound." Esposito, while not a fast or graceful skater, was best known for his unmovable presence in front of the opposition net from which he could score from all angles. Esposito has said, "Scoring is easy. You simply stand in the slot, take your beating and shoot the puck into the net." He also possessed a combination of skating and stickhandling ability, strength, and long reach that enabled him to "rag the puck," holding onto it for long periods of time in the face of opponents' checks and thus enabling his team to kill off penalties. Along the way, he captured the Art Ross Trophy as the top regular-season scorer in 1969 and 1971 to 1974, and led the League in goals six straight seasons between 1969–70 and 1974–75.

As of May 2024, Esposito ranked second in all-time regular-season goals for Boston with 459 (behind only Johnny Bucyk's 545). As of 2024, Esposito was fourth behind Brad Marchand, Cam Neely and Patrice Bergeron in all-time Bruins playoff goals with 46. Esposito holds the Boston record for most playoff hat-tricks with four, one of which was a four-goal game versus Toronto in 1969. Often used to kill penalties, Esposito scored 20 shorthanded goals for Boston over his career. His last full season with Boston was 1975–76, in which he scored 61 goals and 127 points. During his time with Boston, Esposito played in the All-Star Game seven straight years from 1969-1975, was selected as a first team all star six straight years from 1969-1974, and was named to the NHL second all star team twice in 1969 and 1975.

=== New York Rangers (1975–1981) ===
In 1975–76, Esposito was traded because he did not want to relinquish his playing time, even with his age. He and Carol Vadnais were traded to the New York Rangers on November 7 in exchange for Brad Park, Joe Zanussi and Jean Ratelle. This trade was monumental, as Esposito was still a great scorer, but Ratelle was a skilled centre and Park was arguably the second best defenceman in the NHL, behind Bobby Orr. Esposito was upset to be traded from Boston as he became thoroughly connected with Boston and its fan base. When Don Cherry went to Esposito’s hotel room to tell him he was going to be traded Esposito stated "Please don’t say it’s New York, please, because if you do I am going to jump out the window." However one of his best singular performances would later come against the Bruins in a four-goal game on March 15, 1979. He finished the 1975–76 season appearing in 62 games for the Rangers, scoring 29 goals and 38 assists. His overall totals for the season were 35 goals and 48 assists in 74 games.

While not as strong an offensive force as in his glory days, as captain of the Rangers Esposito still led the team in points each of his full seasons with the club and remained an effective scorer until his final season. During the 1976-77 season Esposito appeared in all 80 games and was a point per game scorer finishing with exactly 80 points (36 goals and 46 assists). He had similar production in 1977–78 scoring 81 points (38 goals and 43 assists) in 79 games. On November 4, 1977, Esposito scored his 600th NHL goal, against the Vancouver Canucks, becoming the first player to reach that milestone in a Rangers uniform and the third player in NHL history. However the Rangers were defeated in the first round of the playoffs.

The highlight of his years in New York came during the 1978-79 season, in which he played every regular season game scoring 78 points, and led the Rangers all the way to the 1979 Stanley Cup Final where, at 37 years of age, he finished third in postseason scoring with 20 points. Esposito had a nearly identical season in 1979–80 as he once again appeared in all 80 games scoring 78 points (34 goals 44 assists). The Rangers advanced to the second round of the playoffs where they were defeated by the Flyers.

Esposito's final season came in 1980-81 when he only played in 41 games before retiring, scoring 7 goals and 13 assists. Near the end of 1980 he could see the writing on the wall, with Rangers general manager and coach Craig Patrick having replaced the fired Fred Shero that November and leaning heavily on younger players. On Christmas Eve of that year Esposito told his wife he planned to retire. Esposito then played his final game on January 9, 1981 vs the Buffalo Sabres. Prior to the game both teams lined up along the blue lines, Esposito was introduced to a sellout crowd at Madison Square Garden and skated out to center ice. He then tossed his gloves back to the bench while the crowd cheered, 'Espo, Espo' for close to four minutes. Gordie Howe was also present to show his respects to Esposito.

He then retired at the end of the season putting an end to his 18 year long career, finishing behind only Gordie Howe in career goals with 717 and total points 1,590, and third in assists 873 to Howe and Stan Mikita. During his time with the Rangers he played in the All star game three times, in 1977, 1978, 1980. From 1979 until his retirement in 1981 Esposito served as the NHLPA President.

== International play ==
In 1972 Esposito took part in the Summit Series, in which he was the captain and inspirational leader for Team Canada and its leading scorer in the series, Esposito won the 1972 Lou Marsh Trophy as Canada's outstanding male athlete of the year and was made an Officer of the Order of Canada. He also scored the first goal of the series and he scored or assisted four times in the deciding game. During that series, his scolding of Canadian fans, who booed the national team after a 5–3 loss to the Soviet Union in Game Four, was credited with firing up his teammates:

"If the Russian fans boo their players in Moscow like you people are booing us, I'll come back and apologize personally to every one of you, but I really don't think that will happen. We gave it and are doing our best. All of us guys are really disheartened. . . We came out here because we love Canada. They're a good hockey team, and we don't know what we could do better, but I promise we will figure it out. But it's totally ridiculous – I don't think it is fair that we should be booed."

Esposito also played for Canada in the inaugural Canada Cup in 1976, on a line with Hall-of-Famers Bobby Hull and Marcel Dionne. During the event he scored 7 points in 7 games helping team Canada secure their first gold medal in the tournament. The following year, he represented Canada once more in the 1977 Ice Hockey World Championships in Vienna.

For his time with Team Canada and his overall career he was later inducted into the Canada's Sports Hall of Fame in 1989, and again in 2005 alongside all the other members of the 1972 Summit Series team.

== Post-playing career ==
=== New York Rangers ===
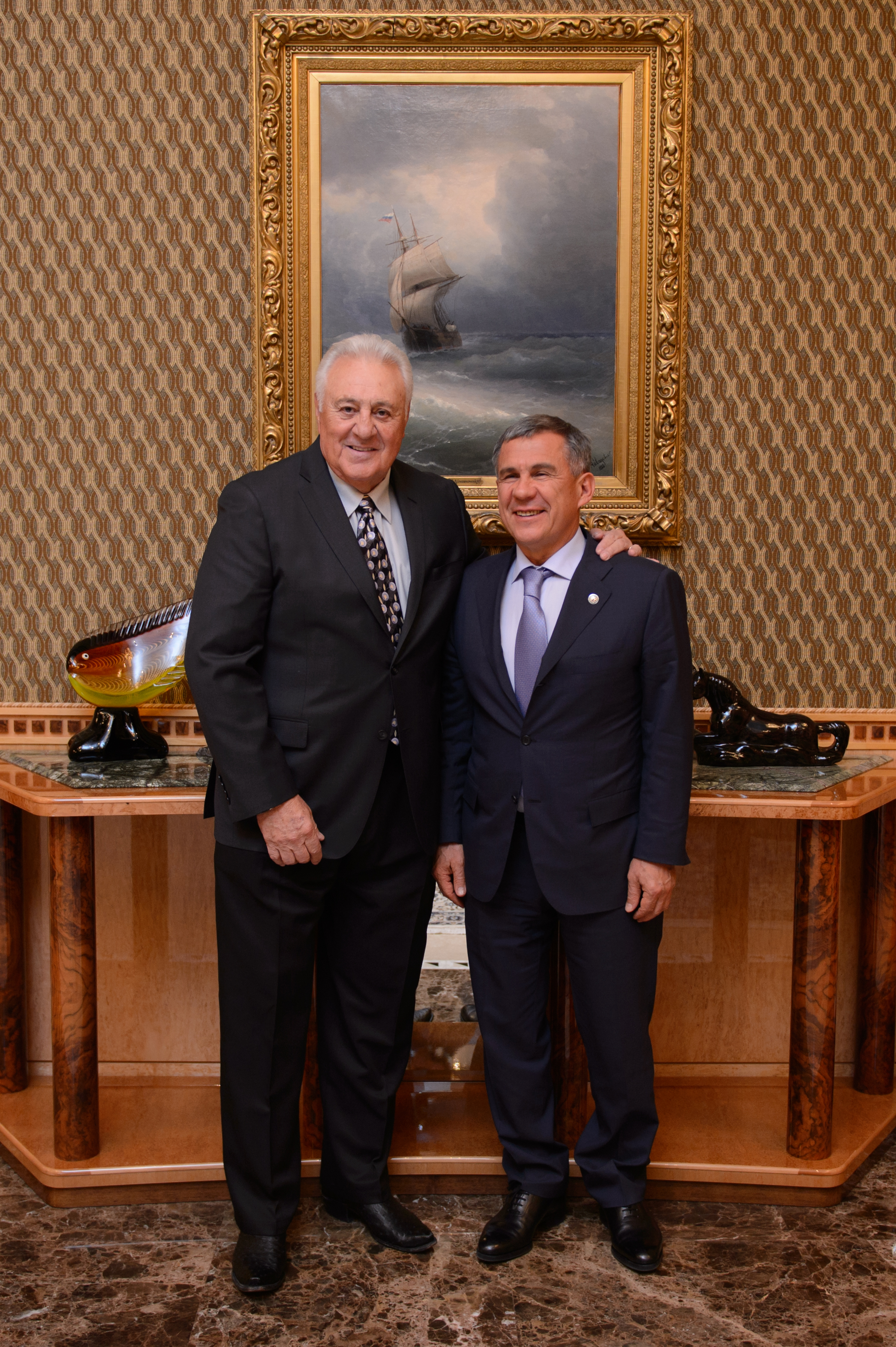
Esposito with Rustam Minnikhanov in 2015

Esposito served as general manager and head coach of the Rangers from 1986 to 1989, during which he earned the nickname "Trader Phil" for the numerous transactions he made. During his tenure as GM, he made more trades than the Vancouver Canucks had made in the entire 1980s. While serving as GM, two of his most famous moves were the trade for the legendary Marcel Dionne and one in which he sent a first-round pick to the Quebec Nordiques as compensation for signing Michel Bergeron to be the Rangers' head coach.

=== Tampa Bay Lightning ===
==== Founder and Manager ====
When the NHL announced its expansion plans in the late 1980s, Phil Esposito, along with his brother Tony, and Mel Lowell, sought to place a franchise in Tampa Bay, Florida. They faced competition from the Compuware Group, which wanted to place a team in nearby St. Petersburg, Florida. It was proposed to Esposito that he merge his bid with the Compuware Group, which he refused. His reputation and force of personality was widely credited with winning the expansion bid for Tampa Bay on December 6, 1990. The Tampa Bay Lightning commenced play in the 1992–93 NHL season, with the elder Esposito as the team's first president and general manager.

For the Lightning's inaugural season, Esposito hired many of his former teammates from the Bruins, including Cashman as an assistant coach and former Bruins trainer John "Frosty" Forristal as trainer. He also made hockey history by signing Manon Rhéaume, making her the first woman to sign with and play for an NHL team.

However, one of the Esposito group's key backers, the Pritzker family, had backed out a few months before the bid, to be replaced by a Japanese consortium headed by Kokusai Green, a golf course and resort operator. Though Kokusai Green had helped the Espositos secure the initial bid, the team languished under their ownership; financed almost entirely by loans, the Lightning were constantly short of cash, hampering Esposito's ability to function as GM. Kokusai Green's owner, Takashi Okubo, never met with the Espositos (or with any other NHL officials), and it was rumored that the consortium was a criminal front for the yakuza. The Lightning quickly fell to the bottom of the league and Esposito fired head coach Terry Crisp in 1997. Even with interim coach Jacques Demers, who had enjoyed successful tenures with the Red Wings and Canadiens, the Lightning lost 55 games for a franchise-worst .268 winning percentage.

Kokusai Green sold the Lightning to insurance tycoon Art Williams in 1998. Shortly after taking control, Williams fired both Esposito brothers two games into the 1998–99 season.

Esposito now serves as vice president of corporate relations for the Lightning.

==== Broadcaster ====
After he retired with the Rangers in 1981, he joined MSG Network/WWOR-TV for the 1981–82 season as a TV color commentator replacing Bill Chadwick. He called games alongside first with Jim Gordon and later Sam Rosen. In 1988, the pair called Wales Conference playoff games for ESPN.

After his firing, Esposito returned to the Lightning organization for the 1999–2000 season as a radio colour commentator. He still calls home games on WHPT (and previously, on WFLA), along with play-by-play commentator Dave Mishkin, with Bobby Taylor replacing him for away games. Esposito also co-hosts a daily call-in show on SiriusXM's SiriusXM NHL Network Radio channel. Esposito is known for his passionate and candid nature, often delivering unfiltered opinions while on commentary.

=== Boston Bruins ===
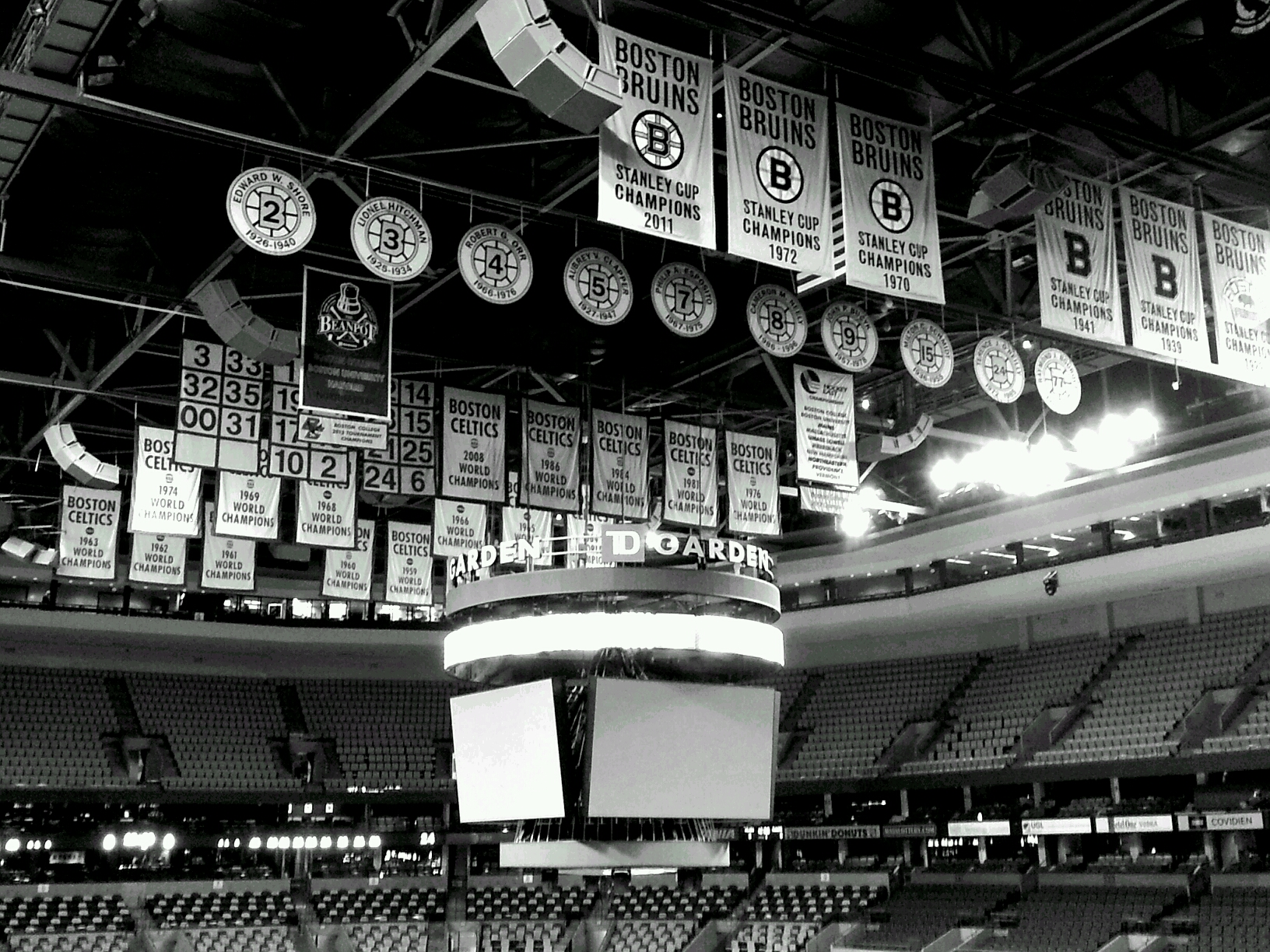
Photo of retired numbers at the TD Garden Esposito’s number was retired in 1987.

On December 3, 1987 Esposito returned to the Boston Garden to watch his number 7 get retired to the rafters. However Ray Bourque at the time wore no. 7. Team president Harry Sinden told Esposito that Bourque would continue to wear the number, and that when Bourque retired his name would be placed to Esposito's, which Esposito supported. During the ceremony, however, Bourque skated over to Esposito to shake his hand and then took off his no. 7 jersey, revealing his newly minted 77 jersey, officially retiring Esposito's jersey with only his name going to the rafters.

In 2005 Esposito returned to Boston and was honored by the sports museums tradition event at the TD Garden as a member of that year's class, and received the hockey legacy award. In 2016 Esposito returned to the event to present Wayne Cashman with the same award.

== Personal life ==
Esposito was married during his playing career to his first wife Linda, and they had three children together Carrie, Laurie, and Cherise. He is now married to his second wife, Bridget, and the couple live in Tampa. His daughter Carrie was married to former NHL player Alexander Selivanov. In 2012 Carrie died of an aneurysm, and in 2016 Esposito along with the Tampa Bay Lighting established the Carrie Esposito Memorial Fund in her honour, which provides financial assistance for children to participate in youth ice hockey programs throughout Tampa Bay.

Esposito's younger brother Tony is also an honoured member of the Hockey Hall of Fame.

After retirement, Esposito established the Phil Esposito Foundation, to help promote the game of hockey and provide crisis financial assistance to former NHL players, many of whom were retired before the league established pension benefits. Esposito also performs charity work in Florida, participating in charity golf events and hockey games. In 2011 Esposito hosted his own celebrity charity golf tournament to raise funds for the All Children's Hospital of St. Petersburg and surrounding communities.

Esposito is an avid golfer, competing in the 2002 World Golf League tournament, and in 2004 he became an official spokesman of the organization.

In 2006 Esposito partnered with Paragon Financial Corp to help introduce the company to builders and real estate developers in need of a preferred mortgage provider.

In 2017 he became a member of the advisory board for Kunlun Red Star.

=== Publications ===
In 1971 Esposito and his brother Tony co-wrote a book about their life and careers called The Brothers Esposito. The following year Esposito released his first book Hockey Is My Life, which was co-written with Gerald Eskenazi, covering his experience in the Summit Series and his time with the Boston Bruins. In 2003 Esposito released his autobiography, Thunder and Lightning, covering his entire playing career along with his post retirement activities up to that point.

== Honours ==
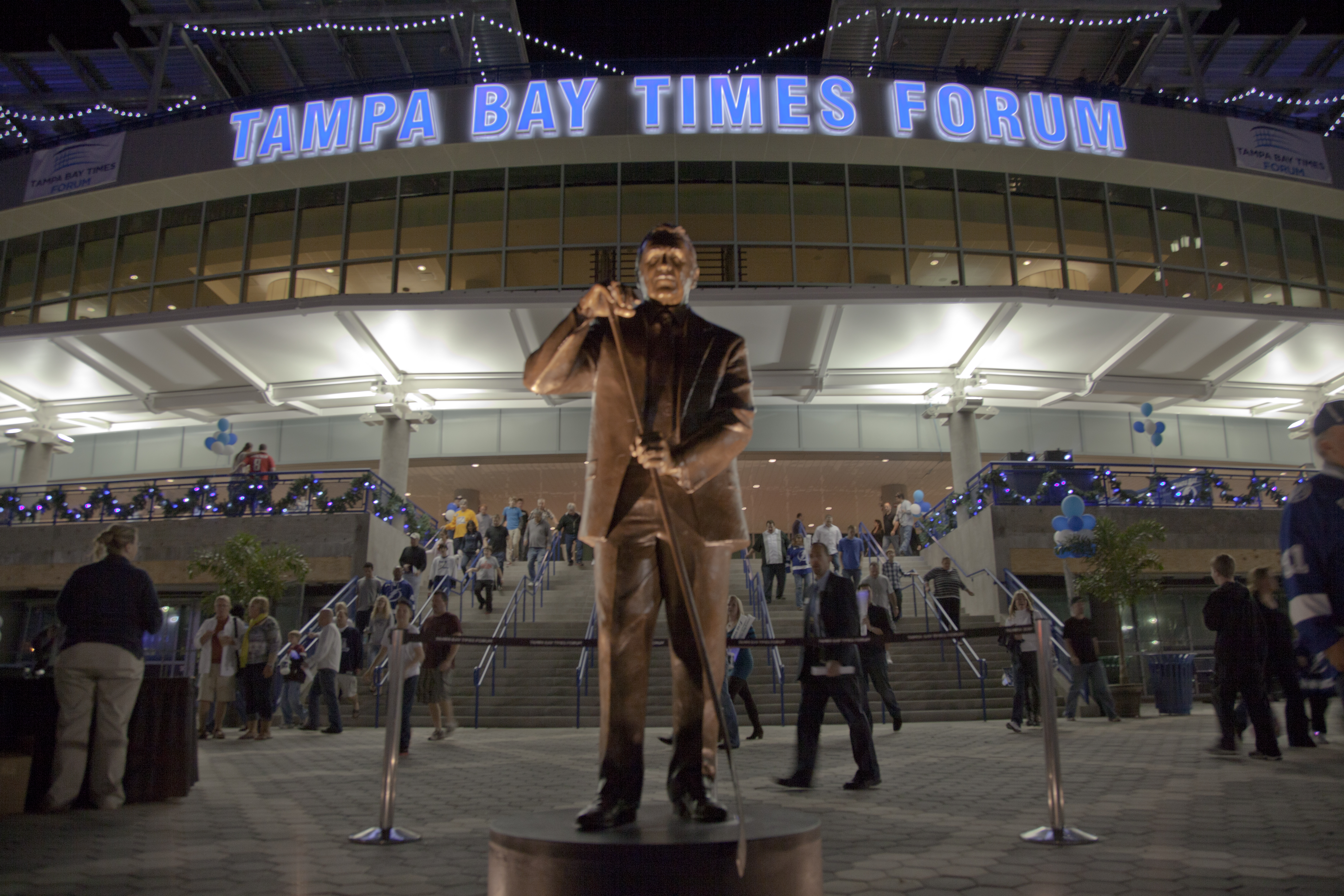
Esposito’s statue outside of the Tampa Bay Lightning's arena

During his playing days in 1972 Esposito received the American Academy of Achievement award, which is given out to high achievers in public service, business, science and exploration, sports, and the arts. That same year he was also awarded the Lou Marsh Trophy as the top Canadian athlete of the year.

Phil Esposito park located in Sault Ste. Marie, Ontario was dedicated in his honor in 1981.

In 1984 Esposito was given the Guinness Stout 'Big 'G' Award' for extraordinary accomplishments beyond the game of hockey. They held a special New York Hockey Night event, with all three New York area sports team present to celebrate Esposito. He was also inducted into the New York hockey Hall of Fame during the festivities.

Esposito was elected to the Hockey Hall of Fame in 1984. On December 3, 1987, his No. 7 jersey was retired by the Boston Bruins in an emotional ceremony where the then-current wearer, superstar defenceman Ray Bourque, pulled off his No. 7 jersey to reveal his new number, 77—dramatically "surrendering" his old number in Esposito's favour (coincidentally, Esposito wore 77 with the New York Rangers, because 7 was already being worn by Rod Gilbert). Esposito was "visibly moved" when Bourque showed the Boston Garden crowd his new number, which he used for the rest of his career. Esposito was also on hand in Boston to hand Bourque his retired number after the latter retired. In 2017, Esposito was named one of the 100 Greatest NHL Players. In 2023 Esposito was named to the Boston Bruins All-Centennial Team.

In 2007, alongside his brother Tony, Esposito received a star on the Sault Ste. Marie Walk of Fame. In 2009 Esposito was part of the first group of people to receive a star on the Italian Walk of Fame in Toronto.

On December 31, 2011 the Tampa Bay Lightning unveiled a statue in his honour in front of their home arena, the Tampa Bay Times Forum. He was also inducted as an inaugural member of the Lighting Hall of Fame in 2023.

== Awards and achievements ==
- NHL second All-Star team (1968, 1975)
- Elizabeth C. Dufresne Trophy winner (1968, 1969, 1971, 1973, 1974)
- Played in NHL All-Star Game (1969, 1970, 1971, 1972, 1973, 1974, 1975, 1977, 1978, 1980)
- Art Ross Trophy winner (1969, 1971, 1972, 1973, 1974)
- Hart Memorial Trophy winner (1969, 1974)
- NHL first All-Star team (1969, 1970, 1971, 1972, 1973, 1974)
- NHL goal scoring leader (1970, 1971, 1972, 1973, 1974, 1975)
- Stanley Cup champion (1970, 1972)
- Lester B. Pearson Award winner (1971, 1974)
- Received Golden Plate Award of the American Academy of Achievement in 1972.
- Won Lou Marsh Trophy as Canadian athlete of the year in 1972.
- Bruins Three Stars awards (1974 and 1975)
- 1976 Canada Cup Gold Medal
- Lester Patrick Trophy winner (1978)
- Inducted into the Hockey Hall of Fame in 1984.
- Inducted into the New York Hockey Hall of Fame in 1984.
- His #7 jersey number was retired by the Boston Bruins on December 3, 1987.
- Retired as the second leading all-time NHL goal and point scorer, and third in assists.
- Among the all-time NHL leaders in goals scored (7th), assists (21st), and total points (10th).
- 1968–69 – First player in NHL history to reach 100 points in a single season (finished with 126)
- First player in NHL history to score 1,000 points in a decade (1970s).
- Holds the record for shots on goal in a single season with 550 in 1970–71.
- Third all-time in game-winning goals with 118 (after Alexander Ovechkin and Jaromír Jágr).
- Had thirteen consecutive 30+ goal seasons, second most in NHL history.
- In 1998, he was ranked number 18 on The Hockey News' list of the 100 Greatest Hockey Players.
- Inducted into the Sports Club of Tampa Hall of Fame in 2002.
- Inducted into the Ontario Sports Hall of Fame in 2004.
- Inducted into the Canada Sports Hall of Fame in 2005.
- Inducted in 2007 (alongside brother Tony) into the Sault Ste Marie Walk of Fame.
- In the 2009 book 100 Ranger Greats, was ranked No. 23 all-time of the 901 New York Rangers who had played during the team's first 82 seasons
- Received a star on the Italian Walk of Fame in Toronto in 2009.
- Statue unveiled in his honour in front of the Tampa Bay Times Forum (now Benchmark International Arena) on December 31, 2011.
- Inducted into the Florida Sports Hall of Fame in 2016.
- In 2017, Esposito was named one of the '100 Greatest NHL Players' in history.
- In 2023, Esposito was named as one of the inaugural members of the Tampa Bay Lightning Hall of Fame.
- Named One of the Top 100 Best Bruins Players of all Time.
- Boston Bruins All-Centennial Team

== Career statistics ==
=== Regular season and playoffs ===
- **Bold** indicates led league

| | | | Regular season | | | | | Playoffs |
| Season | Team | League | GP | G | A | Pts | PIM | GP | G | A | Pts | PIM |
|---|---|---|---|---|---|---|---|---|---|---|---|---|
| 1961–62 | St. Catharines Teepees | OHA | 49 | 32 | 39 | 71 | 54 | 6 | 1 | 4 | 5 | 9 |
| 1961–62 | Sault Thunderbirds | EPHL | 6 | 0 | 3 | 3 | 2 | — | — | — | — | — |
| 1962–63 | St. Louis Braves | EPHL | 71 | 36 | 54 | 90 | 51 | — | — | — | — | — |
| 1963–64 | St. Louis Braves | CPHL | 43 | 26 | 54 | 80 | 65 | — | — | — | — | — |
| 1963–64 | Chicago Black Hawks | NHL | 27 | 3 | 2 | 5 | 2 | 4 | 0 | 0 | 0 | 0 |
| 1964–65 | Chicago Black Hawks | NHL | 70 | 23 | 32 | 55 | 44 | 13 | 3 | 3 | 6 | 15 |
| 1965–66 | Chicago Black Hawks | NHL | 69 | 27 | 26 | 53 | 49 | 6 | 1 | 1 | 2 | 2 |
| 1966–67 | Chicago Black Hawks | NHL | 69 | 21 | 40 | 61 | 40 | 6 | 0 | 0 | 0 | 7 |
| 1967–68 | Boston Bruins | NHL | 74 | 35 | **49** | 84 | 21 | 4 | 0 | 3 | 3 | 0 |
| 1968–69 | Boston Bruins | NHL | 74 | 49 | **77** | **126** | 79 | 10 | **8** | **10** | **18** | 8 |
| 1969–70 | Boston Bruins | NHL | 76 | **43** | 56 | 99 | 50 | 14 | **13** | **14** | **27** | 16 |
| 1970–71 | Boston Bruins | NHL | 78 | **76** | 76 | **152** | 71 | 7 | 3 | 7 | 10 | 6 |
| 1971–72 | Boston Bruins | NHL | 76 | **66** | 67 | **133** | 76 | 15 | **9** | 15 | **24** | 24 |
| 1972–73 | Boston Bruins | NHL | 78 | **55** | **75** | **130** | 87 | 2 | 0 | 1 | 1 | 2 |
| 1973–74 | Boston Bruins | NHL | 78 | **68** | 77 | **145** | 58 | 16 | 9 | 5 | 14 | 25 |
| 1974–75 | Boston Bruins | NHL | 79 | **61** | 66 | 127 | 62 | 3 | 4 | 1 | 5 | 0 |
| 1975–76 | Boston Bruins | NHL | 12 | 6 | 10 | 16 | 8 | — | — | — | — | — |
| 1975–76 | New York Rangers | NHL | 62 | 29 | 38 | 67 | 28 | — | — | — | — | — |
| 1976–77 | New York Rangers | NHL | 80 | 34 | 46 | 80 | 52 | — | — | — | — | — |
| 1977–78 | New York Rangers | NHL | 79 | 38 | 43 | 81 | 53 | 3 | 0 | 1 | 1 | 5 |
| 1978–79 | New York Rangers | NHL | 80 | 42 | 36 | 78 | 37 | 18 | 8 | 12 | 20 | 20 |
| 1979–80 | New York Rangers | NHL | 80 | 34 | 44 | 78 | 73 | 9 | 3 | 3 | 6 | 8 |
| 1980–81 | New York Rangers | NHL | 41 | 7 | 13 | 20 | 20 | — | — | — | — | — |
| NHL totals | | | 1,282 | 717 | 873 | 1,590 | 910 | 130 | 61 | 76 | 137 | 138 |

=== International ===
| Year | Team | Event | GP | G | A | Pts | PIM |
|---|---|---|---|---|---|---|---|
| 1972 | Canada | SS | 8 | 7 | 6 | 13 | 15 |
| 1976 | Canada | CC | 7 | 4 | 3 | 7 | 0 |
| 1977 | Canada | WC | 10 | 7 | 3 | 10 | 14 |
| Senior totals | | | 25 | 18 | 12 | 30 | 29 |

== Head coaching record ==
| Team | Year | Regular season | | | | | | Postseason | | | |
| Team | Year | G | W | L | T | Pts | Finish | W | L | Win% | Result |
|---|---|---|---|---|---|---|---|---|---|---|---|
| NYR | 1986–87 | 43 | 24 | 19 | 0 | (48) | 4th in Patrick | 2 | 4 | .333 | Lost in Division Semifinals (PHI) |
| NYR | 1988–89 | 2 | 0 | 2 | 0 | (0) | 3rd in Patrick | 0 | 4 | .000 | Lost in Division Semifinals (PIT) |
| Total | | 45 | 24 | 21 | 0 | | | 2 | 8 | .200 | 2 playoff appearances |

== In popular culture ==
Esposito and New York Rangers teammates Ron Duguay, Dave Maloney and Anders Hedberg famously appeared in a TV commercial for Sasson designer jeans in 1979. In 1979, Esposito and Ranger teammates recorded a song written by Alan Thicke as a fundraiser for the Juvenile Diabetes Research Foundation called "Hockey Sock Rock".

Esposito makes an appearance in the 2015 animated Christmas special, The Curse of Clara: A Holiday Tale, both as a young ballet dancer's imaginary mentor and as the actual person performing a cameo in The Nutcracker. He voiced the role himself.

Esposito also appeared in a recurring role for several episodes as a fire chief in Denis Leary's FX show Rescue Me.

== Bibliography ==
- The brothers Esposito (1971) co written with his brother Tony Esposito
- We can teach you to play hockey (1972)
- Hockey is my life (1972)
- Phil Esposito's Winning hockey for beginners (1976)
- Thunder and Lightning: A No - B. S. Hockey Memoir (2003)

== See also ==
- 1972 Summit Series
- Hockey Hall of Fame
- List of Canadian sports personalities
- List of NHL players with 1,000 games played
- List of NHL players with 1,000 points
- List of NHL players with 500 goals
- List of NHL statistical leaders
- Notable families in the NHL

Sporting positions
| New creation | Tampa Bay Lightning owner 1992–1998 | Succeeded by Arthur L. Williams Jr. |
| Preceded by Brad Park | New York Rangers captain 1975–78 | Succeeded by Dave Maloney |
| Preceded by Bobby Clarke | NHLPA President; 1979 – February 10, 1981 | Succeeded by Tony Esposito |
| Preceded by Michel Bergeron; Tom Webster | Head coach of the New York Rangers; 1989; 1986–87 | Succeeded by Roger Neilson; Michel Bergeron |
| Preceded by Position created | General Manager of the Tampa Bay Lightning; 1992–98 | Succeeded by Jacques Demers |
| Preceded by Craig Patrick | General Manager of the New York Rangers; 1986–89 | Succeeded by Neil Smith |
Awards and achievements
| Preceded by Bobby Hull | NHL Goal Leader; 1970, 1971, 1972, 1973, 1974, 1975 | Succeeded by Reggie Leach |
| Preceded by new award Bobby Clarke | Lester B. Pearson Award winner 1971; 1974 | Succeeded by Jean Ratelle; Bobby Orr |
| Preceded by Bobby Clarke; Stan Mikita | Winner of the Hart Memorial Trophy; 1974; 1969 | Succeeded by Bobby Clarke; Bobby Orr |
| Preceded by Stan Mikita; Bobby Orr | Winner of the Art Ross Trophy; 1969; 1971, 1972, 1973, 1974 | Succeeded by Bobby Orr; Bobby Orr |
