= Karmanos Cancer Institute =

Cancer research and provider network

Barbara Ann Karmanos Cancer Institute

Geography
- Location: 4100 John R St, Detroit, Michigan, United States

Organization
- Care system: Non-profit
- Type: Cancer
- Affiliated university: Wayne State University School of Medicine

Services
- Beds: 123

History
- Founded: 1943

Links
- Website: http://www.karmanos.org
- Lists: Hospitals in Michigan

The Barbara Ann Karmanos Cancer Institute is a cancer research and provider network headquartered in Detroit, Michigan affiliated with the Wayne State University School of Medicine. The Karmanos Cancer Institute has 18 treatment locations and is one of 57 National Cancer Institute-designated comprehensive cancer treatment and research centers in the United States.

Karmanos' vision is a world free of cancer and its mission is to lead in transformative cancer care, research and education through courage, commitment and compassion.

== History ==
Karmanos began as the Detroit Institute for Cancer Research in 1943. It was registered as a non-profit organization in 1949. The institute was later named the Michigan Cancer Foundation, encompassing the Meyer L. Prentis Comprehensive Cancer Center of Metropolitan Detroit and the cancer programs of the Detroit Medical Center and Wayne State University.

In 1995, the cancer center was named after Barbara Ann Karmanos, the late wife of Peter Karmanos Jr., former chairman and chief executive officer of Compuware Corporation. Barbara Ann Karmanos succumbed to breast cancer at the age of 46.

On October 30, 2013, Karmanos Cancer Institute and McLaren Health Care Corporation signed an agreement that created the largest cancer research and provider network in Michigan. The agreement was finalized in January 2014.

In 2018, the institute reported that it had 1,000 staff members, including 300 doctors, and 100 researchers, with the staff treating approximately 12,000 patients each year It had an operating budget of $260 million.

== About ==
The Karmanos Cancer Institute has 18 treatment locations and is one of 57 National Cancer Institute-designated comprehensive cancer treatment and research centers in the United States.

Karmanos has one of the largest clinical trials programs in the nation, giving patients access to more than 250 treatments. It conducts 800 cancer-specific scientific investigations programs and clinical trials each year. The institute has a Phase 1 program, a participating site in the Early Therapeutics Clinical Trials Network (ET-CTN) of the NCI.

== Recognition ==
In 2018, Karmanos was named one of America's Best Hospitals for Cancer Care & Research by the Women's Choice Award. Previously, Karmanos had been ranked as one of America's Best Hospitals for Cancer Care by the Women's Choice Award, from 2011-2012, as well as 2014-2017. It also won the Women's Choice Award for Patient Experience in 2017.

== Leadership ==
The Institute is under the direction of President and CEO Boris C. Pasche, M.D., Ph.D., FACP. Brian Gamble is president of Barbara Ann Karmanos Cancer Hospital & Network, overseeing clinical operations in Detroit, as well as the Karmanos cancer network across Michigan.
