= Dave Mishkin =

American radio personality (born 1969)

- Born: 1969 (age 56–57); New York, U.S.
- Education: Yale University
- Occupations: Broadcaster; media personality
- Spouse: Dulcie Mishkin (m. 2003)
- Children: 2

Dave Mishkin is an American radio personality and author serving as the play-by-play voice for the Tampa Bay Lightning. Mishkin is known for his energetic goal-calls during games.

== Early life and education ==
Mishkin was born in New York and raised in Boston. He attended Yale University, and in his freshman year, expressed interest in sports broadcasting after noticing a flyer promoting a broadcast of a football game for WYBC, the college radio station. Mishkin began to record trials of game calls, using a tape recorder to practice until he was ready to go on air. He began broadcasting in his sophomore year. Mishkin graduated from the university in 1991, majoring in American Studies. Upon graduation, Mishkin had done play-by-play for multiple sports, including sixty hockey games through his junior and senior years, where he also became WYBC's sports director.

== Career ==
Directly after college, Mishkin began working with the Johnstown Chiefs of the East Coast Hockey League for their 1991-92 season. In addition to his role as a broadcaster, he wrote press releases, handled player appearances, and sold tickets for the team. Mishkin worked with the Johnstown Chiefs for three seasons.

Mishkin went on to become the radio and TV voice of the Hershey Bears, serving in the role for eight seasons with the team, which included Hershey's 1996-97 Calder Cup-winning season. At the same time, Mishkin spent three years as a media director and play-by-play broadcaster for the Hershey Wildcats, an A-League soccer team.

Mishkin was hired by the Tampa Bay Lightning in 2002, joining the team's radio broadcast team with Phil Esposito for the Lightning's 2002-03 season. By the time he joined the Lightning, Mishkin had broadcast for nearly a thousand games for teams in the minor leagues. After each game, Mishkin writes for a segment titled Mishkin's Extra Shift, detailing his perspective on the game for the Tampa Bay Lightning website. During the Lightning's 2019-20 Stanley Cup win, which took place behind closed doors in Edmonton, Mishkin called the game from Amalie Arena due to travel restrictions amid the COVID-19 pandemic.

In 2024, Mishkin's book, Blind Squirrel, was published. The story revolves around a minor league hockey player struggling with their mental health. Mishkin began writing the fictional novel in 2005, starting with two chapters, going on to write the majority of it closer to the book's release.

In March 2026, Mishkin made his television broadcasting debut, calling the play-by-play in a 6-2 Lightning win over the Vancouver Canucks. He swapped roles over a three-game road trip with Dave Randorf, who assumed Mishkin's radio duties during the stretch.

=== Board roles ===
Mishkin serves on the Board of Trustees at Tampa Preparatory School.

== Personal life ==
Mishkin married his wife, Dulcie, on June 27, 2003. They have two children. Mishkin resides in Tampa, Florida.

== Bibliography ==
- Blind Squirrel by Dave Mishkin. St. Petersburg FL: St. Petersburg Press, 2024. ISBN 978-1-940300-84-9 OCLC 1433997953
