= Mel Lowell =

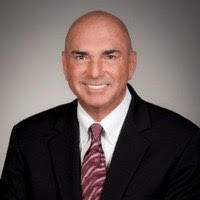
- Born: April 23, 1947 (age 78); Queens, New York City, U.S.
- Education: Pace University
- Spouse: Peggy Lowell
- Children: 2

Mel Lowell (born April 23, 1947) is an American sports executive and businessman who co-founded the Tampa Bay Lightning and played a pivotal role in bringing an NHL team to Florida. He was instrumental in establishing the team in 1992 alongside hockey legend Phil Esposito. Lowell served as the franchise's first executive vice president and treasurer.

== Early life ==
Melvyn Lowell was born on April 23, 1947 to a Jewish family in Queens, New York City. Lowell married his high-school sweetheart, Peggy, while attending Pace University in New York City. Lowell graduated with a BBA from the Pace University Honors Program in Accountancy Practice, Finance and Administration. After five years of public accounting, Lowell served as vice-president of Finance and Business Affairs for Madison Square Garden, the New York Knicks, the New York Rangers, and MSG Boxing for 14 years.

== Tampa Bay Lightning ==
In 1992, Lowell, alongside NHL Hall of Famer Phil Esposito founded the Tampa Bay Lightning. Lowell served as executive vice-president until 1997.

In the early 1990s, Lowell partnered with Phil Esposito to secure an NHL expansion franchise for Tampa Bay, Florida, a non-traditional hockey market. His financial leadership and strategic planning were integral to the team’s founding and its early operations. The Lightning have since grown into one of the most successful NHL franchises, winning multiple Stanley Cup championships and expanding hockey’s popularity in the southern United States. After leaving that position, Lowell was retained by various professional sports teams and was a partner in a firm constructing and managing sports facilities in the southeast.

== Jewish Federation ==
After his tenure in professional sports, Lowell transitioned to nonprofit leadership. He served as the chief operating officer of the Jewish Federation of South Palm Beach County. Lowell also serves as the treasurer and director of Federation CCRC Operations Corp., the entity responsible for the development of Sinai Residences, a premier Life Plan Community located in Boca Raton, Florida, which provides high-quality living options for seniors, including independent living, assisted living, memory care, and skilled nursing facilities.

== Personal life ==
Lowell enjoys hunting and fishing with his grandchildren and is a staunch New York Giants fan. He currently lives in Parkland, Florida.

Lowell is Jewish.
