= Peter Karmanos Jr. =

American businessman (born 1943)

- Born: March 11, 1943 (age 83); Detroit, Michigan, U.S.
- Occupation: Former CEO of Compuware Corporation
- Known for: Former owner of the Carolina Hurricanes
- Awards: 1x Stanley Cup champion (as owner) 2006, 2006 with Hurricanes; Hockey Hall of Fame, 2015

Peter Karmanos Jr. (born March 11, 1943) is an American businessman who was most recently the minority owner and alternate governor of the Carolina Hurricanes franchise until June 30, 2021. He served as their principal owner from 1994 (when the Hurricanes were the Hartford Whalers) to 2018. He also owned the Plymouth Whalers junior ice hockey club from its establishment in 1990 until 2015, and was the majority owner of the Florida Everblades from 1998 to 2019.

== Early life ==
Karmanos Jr. was born in Detroit to Petros and Fotini Karamanos. The oldest of three children, his Greek immigrant family owned a small restaurant in Detroit. Karmanos attended Henry Ford High School and Cass Technical High School, graduating from Wayne State University in 1973. Soon after leaving college he founded software company Compuware with two partners, Thomas Thewes and Allen Cutting. Karmanos served as Compuware's CEO until June 20, 2011, when he became executive chairman. Karmanos retired from Compuware on March 31, 2013, but maintained a consultant role within the company. Compuware terminated his post-retirement consulting agreement, effective October 1, 2013. He has since opened a new computer firm, Mad Dog Technology.

== Ice hockey ventures ==
Karmanos co-founded the Detroit Compuware Hockey organization in the late 1970s with Thewes. The organization has included all levels of hockey from recreational to youth AAA and junior A. The Ontario Hockey League awarded an expansion franchise on December 11, 1989, to be known as the Detroit Compuware Ambassadors. The team later became the Detroit Junior Red Wings, Detroit Whalers and then Plymouth Whalers following a relocation to nearby Plymouth. In 2015, Karmanos sold the Whalers to the owners of Flint's Perani Arena and Event Center, and the franchise was renamed Flint Firebirds. He also sold the Plymouth arena to USA Hockey.

Karmanos, his Compuware partner Thewes, and former player Jim Rutherford purchased the Hartford Whalers in 1994, for $47.5 million. At the time, they had committed to keeping the team in Hartford for at least four years. Connecticut's then-governor Lowell P. Weicker announced that Karmanos would be critical for the team to stay in Hartford. Weicker later became a member of the Compuware Board of Directors. Hartford sold less than 11,000 season tickets for the 1995–96 NHL season and Karmanos announced the team would leave Hartford if the Whalers were unable to sell 11,000 season tickets for the 1996–97 season. Even though they surpassed 11,000 season tickets, the team was moved to Raleigh, North Carolina, and renamed the Carolina Hurricanes following the 1996–97 season. As a result, Karmanos is still reviled by many people in Connecticut. The Hurricanes reached the Stanley Cup Finals in 2002, but lost to fellow Detroit businessman Mike Ilitch’s Detroit Red Wings in five games. The Hurricanes went on to win the Stanley Cup in 2006, with Karmanos eagerly donning his skates, hoisting the Cup, and skating around with it briefly after the game seven win. For his day with the Cup, he brought it to Compuware headquarters in Detroit and allowed employees to get their photo taken individually with the Cup.

Karmanos' Gale Force Holdings has a subsidiary dedicated to the NHL, Hurricanes Holdings, LLC, which includes the Hurricanes and their stadium, PNC Arena. The holdings also included the Hurricanes's former ECHL affiliate Florida Everblades, along with stadium Hertz Arena until 2019 when they both were sold to Naples businessman David Hoffmann.

Karmanos received the Lester Patrick Trophy for outstanding service to hockey after the 1997–98 season, the Bill Long Award in 2010 for services to the Ontario Hockey League, and was inducted to the United States Hockey Hall of Fame in 2013. He was inducted to the Hockey Hall of Fame in the Builder Category in 2015.

Karmanos also sponsors youth hockey programs in Michigan.

On January 11, 2018, it was announced that he had sold controlling interest in the Hurricanes to Thomas Dundon, while retaining a minority interest. On June 30, 2021, Karmanos sold his remaining shares in the Carolina Hurricanes to Dundon, making him the sole owner of the Carolina Hurricanes. He sold the Florida Everblades in August 2019.

== Personal life ==
Karmanos donated money to the Michigan Cancer Foundation, which was renamed the Barbara Ann Karmanos Cancer Institute in 1995 in memory of his first wife, Barbara Ann Karmanos, who died of breast cancer in 1989. In addition to three children with Barbara, Karmanos has four others with current wife Danialle, and nine grandchildren.

Sporting positions
Preceded by Richard Gordon; Donald Conrad	Hartford Whalers principal owner Carolina Hurricanes principal owner 1994–2018	Succeeded by Thomas Dundon
