= Compuware =

American software company based in Detroit

Compuware Corporation

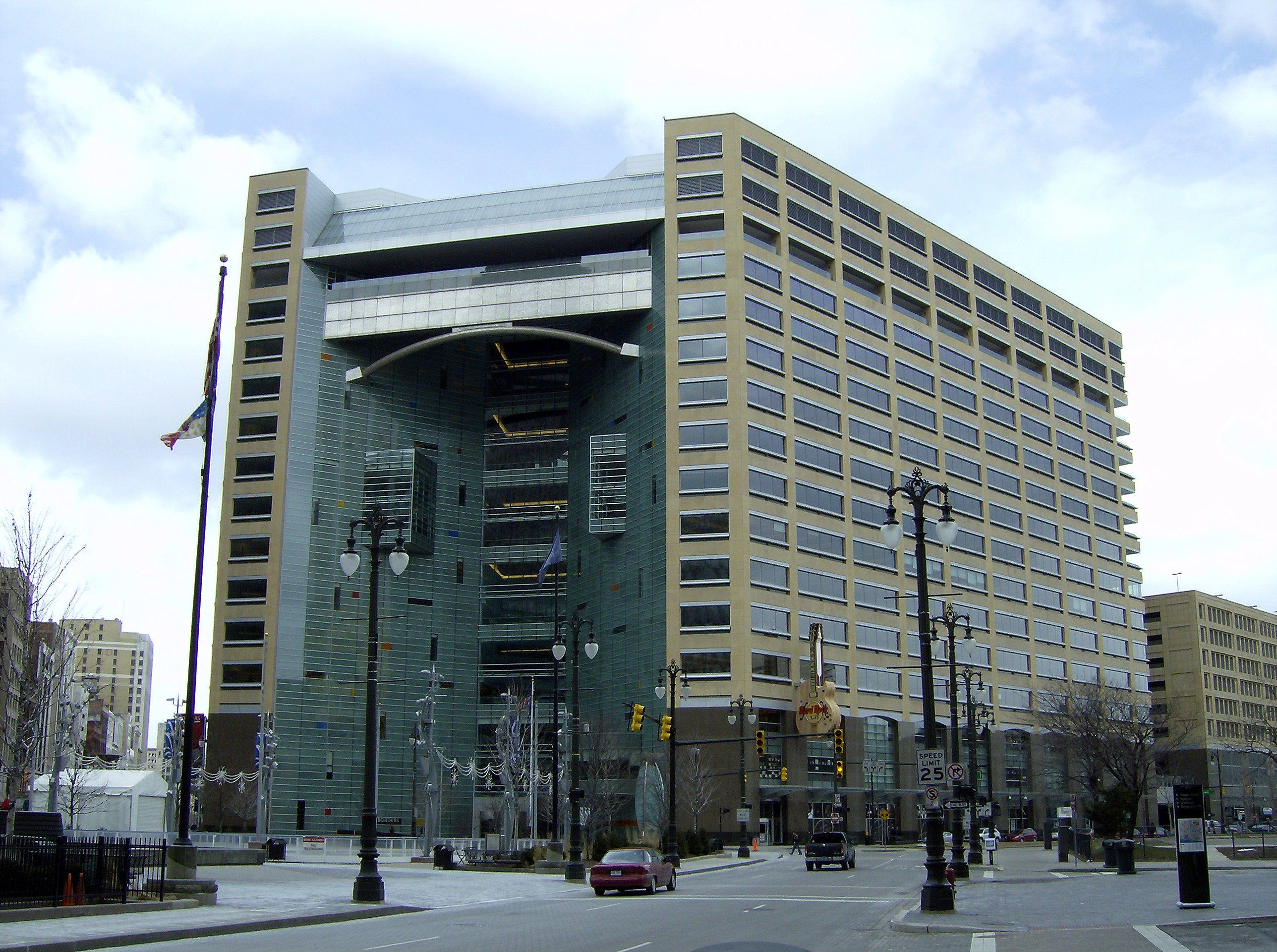
- Former Compuware Headquarters
- Type: Public
- Traded as: Nasdaq: CPWR
- Industry: Information technology
- Founded: 1973; 53 years ago
- Founder: Peter Karmanos, Jr. Thomas Thewes; Allen B. Cutting
- Defunct: 2020
- Fate: Acquired by BMC Software
- Headquarters: Detroit, Michigan, United States
- Products: Enterprise software
- Services: IT services
- Website: bmc.com/it-solutions/brands/compuware.html

Compuware was an American software company based in Detroit. The company developed enterprise software primarily for mainframe computing environments and provided related services, including software testing, development, and performance management.

The company ceased to operate as an independent entity in 2020 following its acquisition by BMC Software.

== History ==
Original Compuware logo

In 1973, Peter Karmanos Jr., Thomas Thewes, and Allen B. Cutting established Compuware Corporation to provide clients with professional technical services. By 1978, Compuware opened its first remote office to service the Washington, D.C., and Baltimore area. In 1992, the company completed its initial public offering (IPO) and traded on the NASDAQ under the symbol CPWR. At the end of 1998, Compuware surpassed the $1 billion revenue mark.

In 2003, Compuware moved its headquarters from Farmington Hills, Michigan, to a new headquarters building in downtown Detroit. In 2014, Compuware sold its headquarters building, later renamed One Campus Martius, following its acquisition by Thoma Bravo. In December of that year, Compuware was acquired by private equity firm Thoma Bravo for approximately $2.5 billion, becoming a privately held company. Following its acquisition by Thoma Bravo, Compuware shifted its focus toward modernizing and consolidating its mainframe software portfolio.

In March 2020, Compuware was acquired by BMC Software for $2 billion. Compuware ceased to exist as a company, but all of its products remain available under the name BMC Automated Mainframe Intelligence (BMC AMI). In October 2022, it was announced that BMC's Detroit office will return to the northwest suburbs of Detroit, moving from One Campus Martius downtown to the Southfield Town Center in nearby Southfield.

== Acquisitions ==
Between 2016 and 2020, Compuware acquired several software companies focused on mainframe development, testing, and data management technologies, including ISPW (2016), Itgrations (2016), and MVS Solutions (2017).

== Hockey ==
Compuware's founders, through the company, also funded many ice hockey-related teams, activities, and organizations, many bearing the company's name.

In 1978, Karmanos and Thewes founded the Compuware Youth Hockey Program, a still-active Detroit area program that leads into Major Junior and NCAA Division I college hockey. The Compuware alumni list of players who have reached the professional National Hockey League (NHL) includes notable players such as Eric Lindros, Pat Peake, Pat LaFontaine, and Mike Modano.

The program eventually expanded to include the Ontario Hockey League's (OHL) Windsor Spitfires, which were renamed the Windsor Compuware Spitfires from 1983 to 1989. Karmanos then sold the team to local construction magnate Steve Riolo after the 1988-89 season, and the team reverted back to the Windsor Spitfires name and adopted their modern logo.

In 1984, Karmanos founded the Detroit Compuware Ambassadors of the North American Hockey League (NAHL). The Ambassadors swiftly became the best junior team in the North American Hockey League, winning five consecutive championships from 1986 through 1990. The NAHL's Compuware Ambasadors lasted from 1984 to 2003.

In 1990, Karmanos then bought an OHL expansion franchise for Detroit, which he also named the Detroit Compuware Ambassadors, although this team played in the OHL rather than the NAHL, and which lasted from 1990 to 1992. The OHL's Compuware Ambassadors were renamed the Detroit Junior Red Wings in 1992 and played in the same arena as the NHL's Detroit Red Wings.

Karmanos then attempted to buy the Red Wings NHL team from its long-time owner Mike Ilitch. When that attempt fell through and the relationship soured, its affiliated junior hockey team severed all ties with the NHL after the 1994–95 season ended. Not having been able to purchase the Red Wings, Karmanos instead purchased the NHL's Hartford Whalers team in 1994, and renamed the former Red Wings junior team the Detroit Whalers.

Karmanos then built his newly-renamed junior team a brand new ice hockey arena, the Compuware Sports Arena in 1996 in Plymouth Township, Michigan, which was renamed to the shortened Compuware Arena starting in 2007. The Detroit Whalers were then renamed again, to the Plymouth Whalers.

In 2015, the USA Hockey Foundation purchased the Compuware Arena and renamed it as the USA Hockey Arena and moved the United States National Team Development Program (USNTDP) from Ann Arbor, Michigan to Plymouth, to be based in the arena. The Plymouth Whalers, now without an arena, were sold in 2015 and were relocated to Flint, becoming the Flint Firebirds.

The Hartford Whalers became the NHL's current Carolina Hurricanes franchise in 1997. During Karmanos' ownership, the team won its first Stanley Cup in 2006. For Karmanos' day with the Cup, he brought it to Compuware headquarters in Detroit and allowed employees to get their photo taken individually with the Cup.

=== Bid for the Tampa Bay NHL expansion team ===
When the National Hockey League (NHL) announced its expansion plans in the late 1980s, Compuware wanted to place a team in St. Petersburg, Florida. Former hockey player Phil Esposito, along with his brother Tony, and Mel Lowell, were in competition with Compuware, and it was proposed to Esposito that he merge his bid with them, which he refused. Esposito's group won the expansion bid for Tampa Bay on December 6, 1990, and the Tampa Bay Lightning commenced play in the 1992–93 NHL season, with the elder Esposito as the team's first president and general manager.
