= List of hospitals in Michigan =

Hospital	County	City	Bed count	Trauma center	Founded	Notes
ProMedica Charles and Virginia Hickman Hospital	Lenawee	Adrian	58			Replacement for Bixby Community Hospital (Adrian) and Herrick Memorial Hospital (Tecumseh).
Ascension Borgess Allegan Hospital	Allegan	Allegan	25			Part of Ascension Michigan Formerly Allegan General Hospital.
MyMichigan Medical Center Alma	Gratiot	Alma	67		1955	Part of MyMichigan Health–University of Michigan Health. Formerly MidMichigan Medical Center-Gratiot.
MyMichigan Medical Center Alpena	Alpena	Alpena	124			Part of MyMichigan Health–University of Michigan Health. Formerly Alpena Regional Medical Center.
Trinity Health Ann Arbor Hospital	Washtenaw	Ypsilanti	524	Level I		Part of Trinity Health. Formerly St. Joseph Mercy Ann Arbor.
University of Michigan Hospital	Washtenaw	Ann Arbor	550	Level I	1869	Part of Michigan Medicine
C.S. Mott Children's Hospital	Washtenaw	Ann Arbor	348	Level I	1969, 2011	Part of Michigan Medicine
Von Voigtlander Women's Hospital	Washtenaw	Ann Arbor	104		2011	Part of Michigan Medicine
Veterans Affairs Ann Arbor Healthcare System	Washtenaw	Ann Arbor				
Havenwyck Hospital	Oakland	Auburn Hills				
McLaren Thumb Region	Huron	Bad Axe	50		1906	Part of McLaren Health Care Corporation. Formerly Huron Medical Center.
Bronson Battle Creek Hospital	Calhoun	Battle Creek	189	Level III	April 19, 1927	Part of Bronson Healthcare Group.
Select Specialty Hospital-Battle Creek	Calhoun	Battle Creek	25			Part of Select Medical Corporation; Located within Bronson Battle Creek Hospital
Southwest Regional Rehabilitation Center	Calhoun	Battle Creek				
VA Medical Center	Calhoun	Battle Creek				
McLaren Bay Region	Bay	Bay City	356	Level III	1908	Part of McLaren Health Care Corporation. Formerly Bay Regional Medical Center.
McLaren Bay Special Care Hospital	Bay	Bay City	31			Part of McLaren Health Care Corporation.
Corewell Health Big Rapids Hospital	Mecosta	Big Rapids	49			Part of Corewell Health. Formerly Mecosta County Medical Center and Spectrum Health Big Rapids Hospital.
Brighton Hospital	Livingston	Brighton	41			Part of Ascension Michigan
Munson Healthcare Cadillac Hospital	Wexford	Cadillac	49	Level IV	1911	Part of Munson Healthcare. Formerly Mercy Hospital–Cadillac.
Caro Center	Tuscola	Caro				
McLaren Caro Region	Tuscola	Caro	25		1928	Part of McLaren Health Care Corporation. Formerly Caro Community Hospital.
University of Michigan Health - Sparrow Carson	Montcalm	Carson City	48			Part of University of Michigan Health - Sparrow. Formerly Carson City Hospital.
Hills & Dales General Hospital	Tuscola	Cass City	25			
Munson Healthcare Charlevoix Hospital	Charlevoix	Charlevoix	25	Level IV	1919	Part of Munson Healthcare
University of Michigan Health - Sparrow Eaton	Eaton	Charlotte	25			Part of University of Michigan Health - Sparrow. Formerly Hayes Green Beach Memorial Hospital and Sparrow Eaton Hospital
McLaren Northern Michigan, Cheboygan Campus	Cheboygan	Cheboygan				Formerly Cheboygan Memorial Hospital prior to closure in 2012, then reopened as a unit of Petoskey's McLaren Northern Michigan Hospital.
MyMichigan Medical Center Clare	Clare	Clare	49			Part of MyMichigan Health–University of Michigan Health. Formerly MidMichigan Medical Center-Clare.
Henry Ford Macomb Hospital	Macomb	Clinton Township	366			part of Henry Ford Health
Insight Hospital and Medical Center Coldwater	Branch	Coldwater	71			Formerly Community Health Care of Branch County and ProMedica Coldwater Regional Hospital.
Huron Valley-Sinai Hospital	Oakland	Commerce Township	158			part of the Detroit Medical Center
Beaumont Hospital, Dearborn	Wayne	Dearborn	632			Part of Corewell Health; Formerly Oakwood Hospital - Dearborn
Deckerville Community Hospital	Sanilac	Deckerville	15			Psychiatric Hospital
Children's Hospital of Michigan	Wayne	Detroit	228			part of the Detroit Medical Center
Detroit Receiving Hospital	Wayne	Detroit	248	Level I		part of the Detroit Medical Center
Harper University Hospital	Wayne	Detroit	470			part of the Detroit Medical Center
Hutzel Women's Hospital	Wayne	Detroit	114			part of the Detroit Medical Center
Karmanos Cancer Center	Wayne	Detroit	123			Part of McLaren Health Care Corporation
Kresge Eye Institute	Wayne	Detroit				part of the Detroit Medical Center
Rehabilitation Institute of Michigan	Wayne	Detroit	69			part of the Detroit Medical Center
Sinai-Grace Hospital	Wayne	Detroit	383			part of the Detroit Medical Center
John D. Dingell Veterans Affairs Medical Center	Wayne	Detroit				adjacent to Detroit Medical Center but operationally separate
Henry Ford Hospital	Wayne	Detroit	877	Level I		part of Henry Ford Health
Select Specialty Hospital-Northwest Detroit	Wayne	Detroit	36			Part of Select Medical Corporation; Located within Sinai-Grace Hospital
Henry Ford St. John Hospital	Wayne	Detroit	687	Level I Adult & Level II Peds		formerly Ascension St. John; transferred to Henry Ford Health in 2024
Ascension Borgess Lee Hospital	Cass	Dowagiac	25			Part of Ascension Michigan. Formerly Lee Memorial Hospital.
Henry Ford River District Hospital	St. Clair	East China	68			formerly Ascension River District Hospital; transferred to Henry Ford Health in 2024
Eaton Rapids Medical Center	Eaton	Eaton Rapids	20		1957	Formerly known as Eaton Rapids Community Hospital
OSF HealthCare St. Francis Hospital	Delta	Escanaba	25			Part of OSF Healthcare System. Formerly Delta County Hospital, then St. Francis Hospital.
Beaumont Hospital, Farmington Hills	Oakland	Farmington Hills	305	Level II		Part of Corewell Health; Formerly Botsford General Hospital
Henry Ford Kingswood Hospital	Oakland	Ferndale	100			psychiatric hospital; part of Henry Ford Health
Hurley Medical Center	Genesee	Flint	383	Level I		
McLaren Flint	Genesee	Flint	342		1919	Part of McLaren Health Care Corporation. Formerly McLaren Regional Medical Center.
Select Specialty Hospital-Flint	Genesee	Flint	26			Part of Select Medical Corporation; Located within McLaren Flint Hospital
Paul Oliver Memorial Hospital	Benzie	Frankfort	8	Level IV	1951	Part of Munson Healthcare
Corewell Health Gerber Hospital	Newaygo	Fremont	25			Part of Corewell Health. Formerly Gerber Memorial Hospital and Spectrum Health Gerber Memorial.
Garden City Hospital	Wayne	Garden City	309	Level III	1959	Part of Prime Healthcare
Munson Healthcare Otsego Memorial Hospital	Otsego	Gaylord	46	Level IV	1951	Affiliated with Munson Healthcare
MyMichigan Medical Center Gladwin	Gladwin	Gladwin	25			part of MyMichigan Health; formerly MidMichigan Medical Center-Gladwin
Henry Ford Genesys Hospital	Genesee	Grand Blanc Township	400	Level II		formerly Ascension Genesys; transferred to Henry Ford Health in 2024
Trinity Health Grand Haven Hospital	Ottawa	Grand Haven	81			Part of Trinity Health. Formerly North Ottawa Community Hospital.
Helen DeVos Children's Hospital	Kent	Grand Rapids	234	Level I Peds		Part of Corewell Health
Forest View Hospital	Kent	Grand Rapids	108			77 adult beds, 31 child/adolscent beds
Mary Free Bed Rehabilitation Hospital	Kent	Grand Rapids	119		1891	Rehabilitation Hospital
Pine Rest Christian Mental Health Services	Kent	Grand Rapids	198		1910	Psychiatric Hospital
Trinity Health Grand Rapids Hospital	Kent	Grand Rapids	357			Part of Trinity Health. Formerly Mercy Health St. Mary's and St. Mary's Hospital.
Corewell Health Butterworth Hospital	Kent	Grand Rapids	852	Level I	1875	Part of Corewell Health
Corewell Health Blodgett Hospital	Kent	Grand Rapids	318			Part of Corewell Health
Munson Healthcare Grayling Hospital	Crawford	Grayling	71	Level IV	1911	Part of Munson Healthcare. Formerly Mercy Hospital Grayling.
Corewell Health Greenville Hospital	Montcalm	Greenville	49			Part of Corewell Health. Formerly United Memorial Hospital and Spectrum Health United Hospital.
Beaumont Hospital, Grosse Pointe	Wayne	Grosse Pointe	280	Level III		Part of Corewell Health. Formerly Bon Secours Hospital.
Henry Ford Cottage Hospital	Wayne	Grosse Pointe Farms	4			Part of Henry Ford Health System, Freestanding ER Only, no inpatient beds.
Select Specialty Hospital-Grosse Pointe	Wayne	Grosse Pointe Farms	26			Part of Select Medical Corporation; Located within Ascension St. John Hospital
UP Health System - Portage	Houghton	Hancock	36	Level III	1896	
Harbor Beach Community Hospital	Huron	Harbor Beach	15			
Corewell Health Pennock Hospital	Barry	Hastings	25			Part of Corewell Health. Formerly Pennock Hospital and Spectrum Health Pennock.
Hillsdale Hospital	Hillsdale	Hillsdale	63			Formerly Hillsdale Community Health Center.
Holland Hospital	Ottawa	Holland	191	Level III	1917	
Sparrow Ionia Hospital	Ionia	Ionia	22			Part of University of Michigan Health - Sparrow
Marshfield Medical Center-Dickinson	Dickinson	Iron Mountain	49			Part of Marshfield Clinic Health System. Formerly Dickinson County Healthcare System.
Veterans Affairs Medical Center	Dickinson	Iron Mountain				
Aspirus Iron River Hospital	Iron	Iron River	25			Part of Aspirus Health. Formerly Northstar Hospital.
Aspirus Ironwood Hospital	Gogebic	Ironwood	25			Part of Aspirus Health. Formerly Grandview Hospital.
UP Health System - Bell	Marquette	Ishpeming	25			Formerly Bell Memorial Hospital. Part of UP Health System.
Fresenius Medical Care at Carelink of Jackson	Jackson	Jackson				
Duane L. Waters Hospital	Jackson	Jackson	112			Located within the Michigan State Prison.
Henry Ford Jackson Hospital	Jackson	Jackson	325		1918	originally Foote Hospital; later Allegiance Health; part of Henry Ford Health
Ascension Borgess Hospital	Kalamazoo	Kalamazoo	372	Level II		Part of Ascension Michigan. Formerly Borgess Memorial Hospital.
Bronson Methodist Hospital	Kalamazoo	Kalamazoo	434	Level I	1900	Part of Bronson Healthcare Group.
Kalamazoo Psychiatric Hospital	Kalamazoo	Kalamazoo	155			State Psychiatric Hospital
Kalkaska Memorial Health Center	Kalkaska	Kalkaska	8		1953	Affiliated with Munson Healthare
Baraga County Memorial Hospital	Baraga	L'Anse	15			
McLaren Greater Lansing Hospital	Ingham	Lansing	262		1913, 2022	Part of McLaren Health Care Corporation; Formerly Ingham Regional Medical Center.
University of Michigan Health - Sparrow Lansing	Ingham	Lansing	573	Level I	1896	Part of University of Michigan Health - Sparrow
University of Michigan Health - Sparrow St. Lawrence	Ingham	Lansing	50		1920	Part of University of Michigan Health - Sparrow. Formerly St. Lawrence Hospital.
University of Michigan Health - Sparrow Specialty Hospital	Ingham	Lansing	30			Part of University of Michigan Health - Sparrow.
McLaren Lapeer Region	Lapeer	Lapeer	183			Part of McLaren Health Care Corporation
Aspirus Keweenaw Hospital	Houghton	Laurium	25			Part of Aspirus Health. Formerly Keweenaw Memorial Medical Center.
Vibra Hospital of Southeastern Michigan	Wayne	Lincoln Park	40			Part of Vibra Healthcare. Formerly Kindred Hospital-Detroit.
Corewell Health Ludington Hospital	Mason	Ludington	39			Part of Corewell Health
Henry Ford Madison Heights Hospital	Oakland	Madison Heights	133			formerly Ascension Macomb-Oakland; transferred to Henry Ford Health in 2024
Munson Healthcare Manistee Hospital	Manistee	Manistee	45	Level IV	1970	Affiliated with Munson Healthcare. Formerly West Shore Medical Center.
Schoolcraft Memorial Hospital	Schoolcraft	Manistique	12			
Marlette Regional Hospital	Sanilac	Marlette	25		1951	Formerly Marlette Community Hospital.
UP Health System - Marquette	Marquette	Marquette	179	Level II	1973	
Oaklawn Hospital	Calhoun	Marshall	77			
MyMichigan Medical Center-Midland	Midland	Midland	308	Level II	1944	Part of MyMichigan Health–University of Michigan Health. Formerly MidMichigan Medical Center-Midland.
ProMedica Monroe Regional Hospital	Monroe	Monroe	217		1922, 1983	Formerly Mercy Memorial Hospital, from a 1972 merger of Monroe Memorial and Mercy Hospitals.
McLaren Macomb	Macomb	Mount Clemens	288	Level II	1945	Part of McLaren Health Care Corporation. Formerly Mount Clemens General Hospital (MCGH).
Select Specialty Hospital-Macomb County	Macomb	Mount Clemens	36			Part of Select Medical Corporation
McLaren Central Michigan	Isabella	Mount Pleasant	118			Part of McLaren Health Care Corporation. Formerly Central Michigan Community Hospital (CMCH).
Munising Memorial Hospital	Alger	Munising	11			
Trinity Health Muskegon Hospital	Muskegon	Muskegon	331			Part of Trinity Health. Formerly Mercy Health Muskegon Mercy Campus.
Harbor Oaks Hospital	Macomb	New Baltimore				
Helen Newberry Joy Hospital	Luce	Newberry	25		1965	
Hawthorn Center	Wayne	Northville				
Henry Ford Providence Novi Hospital	Oakland	Novi	244	Level II		formerly Ascension Providence Hospital Novi Campus; transferred to Henry Ford Health in 2024
Aspirus Ontonagon Hospital	Ontonagon	Ontonagon	25			Part of Aspirus Health. Formerly Ontonagon Memorial Hospital. Effective April 20, 2024, the hospital will transition to a rural health clinic.
Memorial Healthcare	Shiawassee	Owosso	107			
Bronson LakeView Hospital	Van Buren	Paw Paw	16			Part of Bronson Healthcare Group.
McLaren Northern Michigan	Emmet	Petoskey	202			Formerly Northern Michigan Regional Hospital. Part of McLaren Health Care Corporation
Scheurer Hospital	Huron	Pigeon	25			
Ascension Borgess-Pipp Hospital	Allegan	Plainwell	43			Part of Ascension Michigan
Pontiac General Hospital	Oakland	Pontiac	155			Formerly North Oakland Medical Center. Also known as Oakland Physicians Medical Center.
McLaren Oakland	Oakland	Pontiac	278		1953	Part of McLaren Health Care Corporation. Formerly Pontiac Osteopathic Hospital (POH).
Select Specialty Hospital-Pontiac	Oakland	Pontiac	30			Part of Select Medical Corporation; Located within Trinity Health Oakland Hospital.
Trinity Health Oakland Hospital	Oakland	Pontiac	464			Part of Trinity Health. Formerly St. Joseph Mercy Oakland Hospital.
Trinity Health Livonia	Wayne	Livonia	273			Part of Trinity Health. Formerly St. Mary Mercy Hospital.
Trinity Health Livingston Hospital	Livingston	Howell	66		1928	Part of Trinity Health. Formerly St. Joseph Mercy Livingston Hospital and previously McPherson Community Health Center.
Chelsea Hospital	Washtenaw	Chelsea	103			A joint venture of Trinity Health and University of Michigan Health. Formerly St. Joseph Mercy Chelsea Hospital.
McLaren Port Huron Hospital	St. Clair	Port Huron	163		1882	Part of McLaren Health Care Corporation
Corewell Health Reed City Hospital	Osceola	Reed City	22			Part of Corewell Health
Henry Ford Rochester Hospital	Oakland	Rochester Hills	270	Level III		originally Crittenton Hospital; later Ascension Providence Rochester; transferred to Henry Ford Health in 2024
Corewell Health William Beaumont University Hospital	Oakland	Royal Oak	1101	Level I Adult Trauma, Level II Peds		Part of Corewell Health
Aleda E. Lutz Veterans Affairs Medical Center	Saginaw	Saginaw				
Covenant Medical Center	Saginaw	Saginaw	633	Level II Adult & Peds		Includes both Covenant Medical Center–Cooper and Covenant Medical Center–Harrison.
HealthSource Saginaw	Saginaw	Saginaw	25			
Select Specialty Hospital-Saginaw	Saginaw	Saginaw	32			Part of Select Medical Corporation; Located within Covenant Medical Center
MyMichigan Medical Center Saginaw	Saginaw	Saginaw	268	Level II	1874	part of MyMichigan Health; sold by Ascension in 2024
Mackinac Straits Hospital (Mackinac Straits Health System)	Mackinac	Saint Ignace	15		1954	MSHS is an affiliated partner with MyMichigan Health.
University of Michigan Health - Sparrow Clinton	Clinton	Saint Johns	25			Part of University of Michigan Health - Sparrow
Corewell Health Lakeland Hospitals St. Joseph Hospital	Berrien	Saint Joseph	215			Part of Corewell Health
McKenzie Memorial Hospital (McKenzie Health System)	Sanilac	Sandusky	25			
MyMichigan Medical Center Sault	Chippewa	Sault Ste. Marie	82			Part of MyMichigan Health. Formerly War Memorial Hospital.
Trinity Health Shelby Hospital	Oceana	Shelby	24			Part of Trinity Health. Formerly Mercy Health Partners, Lakeshore Campus.
Sheridan Community Hospital	Montcalm	Sheridan	22			
Bronson South Haven Hospital	Van Buren	South Haven	8			Part of Bronson Healthcare Group. Formerly South Haven Community Hospital.
Surgeons Choice Medical Center	Oakland	Southfield	45			Formerly Oakland Regional Hospital.
Henry Ford Providence Southfield Hospital	Oakland	Southfield	359	Level II	1910	formerly Providence Hospital; later; transferred to Henry Ford Health in 2024
Straith Hospital for Special Surgery	Oakland	Southfield	34			
Ascension Standish Hospital	Arenac	Standish	25			Part of Ascension Michigan. Formerly St. Mary's of Michigan Standish Hospital.
Ascension St. Joseph Hospital	Iosco	Tawas City	47			Part of Ascension Michigan
Beaumont Hospital, Taylor	Wayne	Taylor	148			Part of Corewell Health; Formerly Oakwood Heritage Hospital
Select Specialty Hospital-Downriver	Wayne	Taylor				Part of Select Medical Corporation; Located within Beaumont Hospital - Taylor
Three Rivers Health Hospital	St. Joseph	Three Rivers	60			Part of the Beacon Health System.
Munson Medical Center	Grand Traverse	Traverse City	425	Level II	1915	Part of Munson Healthcare
Beaumont Hospital, Trenton	Wayne	Trenton	193			Part of Corewell Health; Formerly Oakwood Southshore Hospital
Beaumont Hospital, Troy	Oakland	Troy	520	Level II		Part of Corewell Health
Insight Surgical Hospital	Macomb	Warren	20			Formerly Southeast Michigan Surgical Hospital.
Ascension Macomb-Oakland Hospital, Warren Campus	Macomb	Warren	348	Level III		Part of Ascension Michigan. Formerly St. John Macomb-Oakland Hospital.
Beaumont Hospital, Wayne	Wayne	Wayne	99	Level II		Part of Corewell Health; Formerly Oakwood Annapolis Hospital
Henry Ford West Bloomfield Hospital	Oakland	West Bloomfield Township	191	Level III	2009	part of Henry Ford Health
MyMichigan Medical Center West Branch	Ogemaw	West Branch	86			part of MyMichigan Health; formerly West Branch Regional Medical Center.
Apex Medical Center	Wayne	Westland				
Walter P. Reuther Psychiatric Hospital	Wayne	Westland				
Henry Ford Wyandotte Hospital	Wayne	Wyandotte	322		1926	Part of Henry Ford Health
University of Michigan Health–West (formerly Metro Health Hospital)	Kent	Wyoming	208	Level II	1942	Formerly Metro Health Hospital, Metro Hospital, Metropolitan Hospital, and Grand Rapids Osteopathic Hospital.
Forest Health Medical Center	Washtenaw	Ypsilanti	68			
Select Specialty Hospital-Ann Arbor	Washtenaw	Ypsilanti	36			Part of Select Medical Corporation; Located within Trinity Health Ann Arbor Hospital.
Corewell Health Zeeland Hospital	Ottawa	Zeeland	55			Formerly Zeeland Community Hospital and Spectrum Health Zeeland Hospital. Part of Corewell Health.

== Former hospitals ==
Hospital	County	City	Bed count	Trauma center	Founded	Closed	Notes
Select Specialty Hospital-Battle Creek	Calhoun	Battle Creek					Part of Select Medical Corporation
Outer Drive Hospital	Wayne	Lincoln Park					Facility sold to Vencor, Inc., currently operated as Vibra Hospital.
Lynn Hospital	Wayne	Lincoln Park					Acquired by Oakwood Health System in 1985, later closed and demolished.
Select Specialty Hospital-Western Michigan	Muskegon	Muskegon					Part of Select Medical Corporation
Riverside Osteopathic Hospital	Wayne	Trenton	162	No	1944	2012	Began ceasing operations in 1992, switched to outpatient only in 2004, all facilities closed in 2012, currently abandoned.
Detroit Hope Hospital	Wayne	Detroit					Closed in January 2010.
United Community Hospital	Wayne	Detroit	388	Yes	October 10, 1974	January 30, 2006	Owner accused of embezzlement charges against insurance provider. Hospital liquidated by Wayne County on January 31, 2006. Currently abandoned. Interior gutted in 2017.
St. John Detroit Riverview Hospital - Northeast Campus	Wayne	Detroit					Closed in 2011. St. John Riverview Hospital
Trillium Hospital	Calhoun	Albion					Closed on February 4, 2002.
Bixby Memorial Hospital	Lenawee	Adrian				2020	Replaced with ProMedica Charles and Virginia Hickman Hospital.
Herrick Medical Center	Lenawee	Tecumseh				2020	Replaced with ProMedica Charles and Virginia Hickman Hospital.
Rogers City Hospital	Presque Isle	Rogers City				1993	
St. John North Shores Hospital	Macomb	Harrison Township				2010	part of St. John Providence; closed November 2, 2010
McLaren–Orthopedic Hospital	Ingham	Lansing				2023	Part of McLaren Health Care Corporation Formerly Ingham Regional Orthopedic Hospital.
Trinity Health Medical Center - Hackley	Muskegon	Muskegon				2010	Formerly Hackley Hospital. Demolished 2022.
Mercy Health Partners, Muskegon General Campus	Muskegon	Muskegon				2019	Formerly Muskegon General Hospital.
Bronson Vicksburg Hospital	Kalamazoo	Vicksburg				2019.	
Yale Community Hospital	St. Clair	Yale				1996	Now Yale Manor Apartments.
Genesys Regional Medical Center–Wheelock Campus	Genesee	Goodrich			1964	1996	Formerly Wheelock Memorial Hospital. Now Flatrock Manor of Goodrich North.
Goodrich General Hospital	Genesee	Goodrich			1916	1961	Structure still exists as Greenview Manor Apartments.
Spectrum Health Kelsey Hospital	Montcalm	Lakeview	16		1908	2023	Closed October 2023.
Community Hospital	Calhoun	Battle Creek			September 12, 1938	1988	Structure still exists as WestBrook Place
Sturgis Hospital	St. Joseph	Sturgis	84			2026	Closed June 19, 2026
