= Bronson Upjohn Building =

- Upjohn Company Office Building
- U.S. National Register of Historic Places
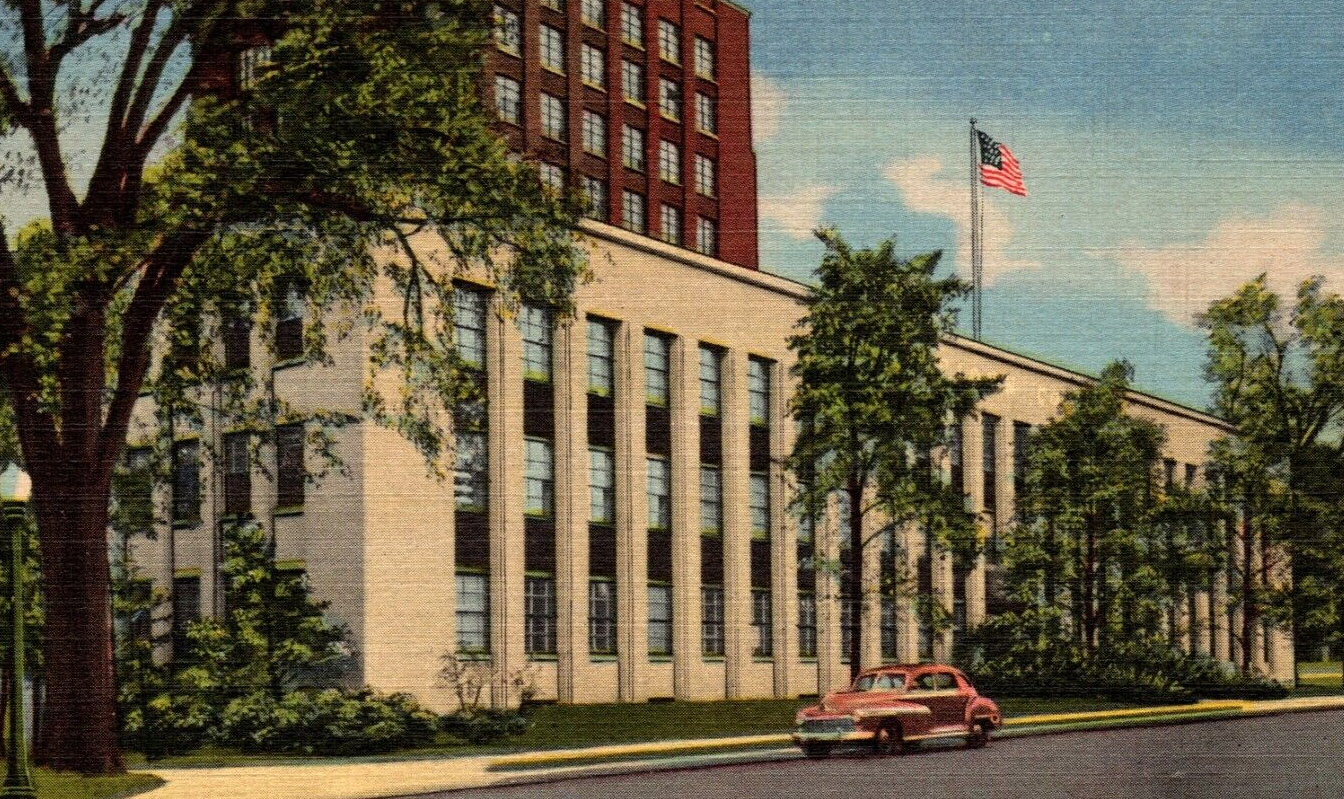
- Upjohn Company Office Building, c. 1935
- Interactive map
- Location: 301 John St., Kalamazoo, Michigan
- Coordinates: 42°17′22″N 85°34′52″W
- Built: 1935
- Architect: Albert Kahn
- Architectural style: Art Moderne
- NRHP reference No.: 100008450
- Added to NRHP: December 9, 2022

The Bronson Upjohn Building, previously known as the Upjohn Company Office Building or Building 24, is an office building located at 301 John Street in Kalamazoo, Michigan. It was listed on the National Register of Historic Places in 2022.

== History ==
In the early part of the 20th century, Upjohn was a growing pharmaceutical firm in Kalamazoo. In the 1910s, the company purchased a group of parcels along what is now John Street, and began constructing new buildings. By 1934, however, the company needed much more space, and they contacted Albert Kahn to design a series of buildings. The first of these, a concentrate plant, was completed in 1934. The second building was this structure, known as "Building 24." This building was completed and ready for occupancy in November 1935. The remaining Kahn buildings were completed by the end of 1936.

This building originally housed administrative personnel. However, in 1936, these personnel moved into a building in Portage, Michigan, where Upjohn had already constructed a newer campus. Building 24 was converted to house Upjohn's International and Patent Law divisions, as well as some Research offices. In 1995, Upjohn merged with Pharmacia, and then in 2000 with Pfizer. In 2005, Pfizer donated Building 24 to Bronson Healthcare Group. Bronson refurbished the building and occupied it in 2008.

== Description ==
The Bronson Upjohn Building is a three-story symmetrical Art Moderne building. All elevations of the building have two-over-two windows that are grouped into vertical sets on each floor. The main facade contains stepped limestone pilasters between the windows. The main entrance is of polished black granite trimmed with aluminum. Above the entry is a metal, tri-band cornice. Just under the eave's stone coping, “The Upjohn Company” is spelled out in tall aluminum letters.
