= DCHS =

DCHS may refer to:

- Daughters of Charity Health System, a hospital chain in California, United States
- Deep Creek Hot Springs, natural hot springs located in San Bernardino National Forest, California, United States
- Dickinson County Healthcare System, a hospital in Iron Mountain, Michigan, United States
- Douglas County Historical Society, Nebraska, United States
- Dame Commander of the Order of the Holy Sepulchre, a Roman Catholic order of knighthood under the protection of the pope

== Schools ==
Philippines

- Davao Christian High School, Davao City

United Kingdom

- Dr Challoner's High School, Buckinghamshire, England
- Drummond Community High School, Edinburgh, Scotland
- The Duchess Community High school, Alnwick, Northumberland, England
- Deans Community High School, Livingston, West Lothian, Scotland

United States

- Danville Community High School, Danville, Indiana
- David Crockett High School, Jonesborough, Tennessee
- Davie County High School, Mocksville, North Carolina
- Daviess County High School, Owensboro, Kentucky
- Dawson County High School, Dawsonville, Georgia
- Decatur Central High School, Indianapolis, Indiana
- Deep Creek High School, Chesapeake, Virginia
- DeKalb County High School, Smithville, Tennessee
- Del City High School, Del City, Oklahoma
- Delta Charter High School, Tracy, California
- Denver City High School (Texas), Denver City, Texas
- Desales Catholic High School (Walla Walla, Washington)
- Divine Child High School, Dearborn, Michigan
- Dodge City High School, Dodge City, Kansas
- Dodge County High School, Eastman, Georgia
- Dougherty Comprehensive High School, Albany, Georgia
- Douglas County High School (Colorado)
- Douglas County High School (Douglasville, Georgia)
- Douglas County High School (Nevada)
- Dowling Catholic High School, West Des Moines, Iowa
- Drew Central High School, Monticello, Arkansas
- Dundee-Crown High School, Carpentersville, Illinois
- Dyer County High School, Newbern, Tennessee
