= Kirk Cousins =

American football player (born 1988)

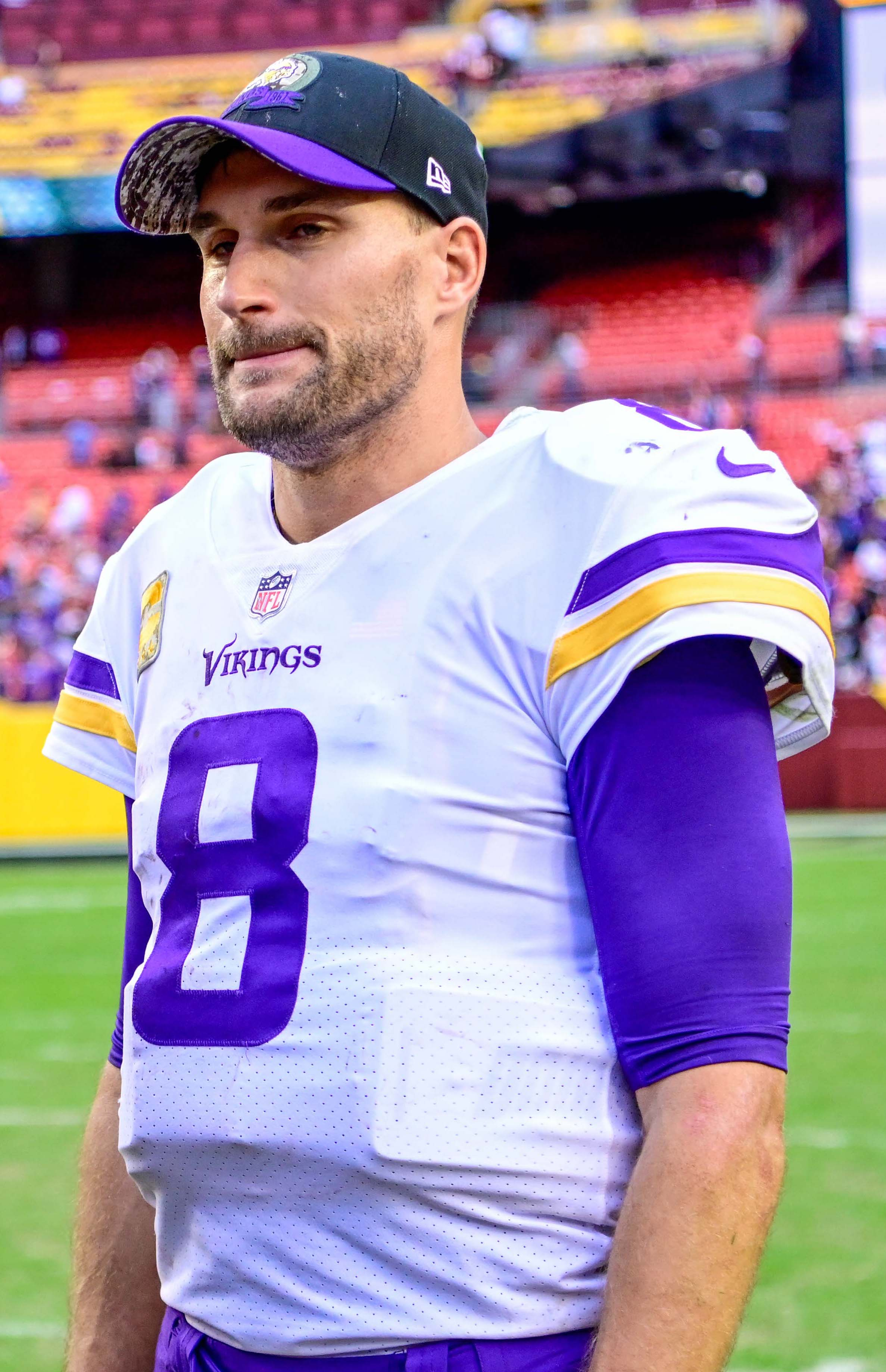
- Cousins with the Minnesota Vikings in 2022

No. 8 – Minnesota Vikings
- Position: Quarterback
- Roster status: Active

Personal information
- Born: August 19, 1988 (age 38); Barrington, Illinois, U.S.
- Listed height: 6 ft 3 in (1.91 m)
- Listed weight: 209 lb (95 kg)

Career information
- High school: Holland Christian (Holland, Michigan)
- College: Michigan State (2007–2011)
- NFL draft: 2012: 4th round, 102nd overall pick

Career history
- Washington Redskins (2012–2017); Minnesota Vikings (2018–2023); Atlanta Falcons (2024–2025); Las Vegas Raiders (2026); Minnesota Vikings (2026–present)

Awards and highlights
- 4× Pro Bowl (2016, 2019, 2021, 2022); NFL completion percentage leader (2015); Second-team All-Big Ten (2011); NFL records: Most game-winning drives in a single season: 8 (tied with Matthew Stafford); Most fourth quarter comebacks in a single season: 8 (tied with Matthew Stafford)

Career NFL statistics as of Week 10, 2026
- Passing attempts: 6,245
- Passing completions: 4,157
- Completion percentage: 66.6%
- TD–INT: 320–140
- Passing yards: 47,247
- Passer rating: 96.8
- Rushing yards: 983
- Rushing touchdowns: 22
- Stats at Pro Football Reference

Kirk Daniel Cousins (born August 19, 1988) is an American professional football quarterback for the Minnesota Vikings of the National Football League (NFL). He played college football for the Michigan State Spartans and was selected by the Washington Redskins in the fourth round of the 2012 NFL draft.

Cousins spent his first three seasons with the Redskins as a backup to Robert Griffin III before replacing an injured Griffin in 2015 and leading the team to a division title. With Washington, Cousins set several franchise records and was named to the 2017 Pro Bowl. After two years of signing franchise tags and being unable to agree with the team on a long-term deal, Cousins signed a fully guaranteed three-year, $84 million contract with the Vikings as a free agent in 2018. In his first six seasons with the Vikings, Cousins earned three Pro Bowl selections and ranks third in the Vikings' all-time passing yards list. He later played two seasons with the Atlanta Falcons and half of a season with the Las Vegas Raiders before being traded back to the Vikings.

== Early life ==
Kirk Cousins was born in Barrington, Illinois on August 19, 1988, to Don Cousins and MaryAnn Cousins. He is the middle child amongst three children. Cousins attended Holland Christian High School in Holland, Michigan, where he starred in football, baseball, and basketball for the Maroons athletic teams. Cousins broke his ankle as a junior and was forced to attend camps in order to make an impression with recruiting colleges. Cousins finished his high school football career with 3,204 passing yards, 40 touchdowns, and 18 interceptions.

After high school, Cousins was set to sign with Toledo or Western Michigan, until Mark Dantonio became the head coach at Michigan State in 2007. After Dantonio failed to sign his top targets at quarterback, he offered a scholarship to Cousins, who accepted. Cousins also participated in the Athletes in Action sports ministry.

College recruiting
Name	Hometown	School	Height	Weight	40^{‡}	Commit date
Kirk Cousins; QB	Holland, MI	Holland Christian HS	6 ft 3 in (1.91 m)	205 lb (93 kg)	4.80	Jan 19, 2007
Kirk Cousins; QB	Recruit ratings: Scout: Rivals:					
Overall recruit ranking: Scout: – (QB) Rivals: – (QB), 27 (MI)
‡ Refers to 40-yard dash; Note: In many cases, Scout, Rivals, 247Sports, On3, and ESPN may conflict in their listings of height, weight and 40 time.; In these cases, the average was taken. ESPN grades are on a 100-point scale.; Sources: "2007 Team Ranking". Rivals.com.

== College career ==
Cousins redshirted his first season at Michigan State University in 2007 season. In 2008, he spent the season as the backup quarterback to Brian Hoyer. Cousins played in five games passing for 310 yards, two touchdowns, and an interception.

In 2009, Cousins competed for and won the starting quarterback job against teammate Keith Nichol. He led Michigan State to a 6–7 (4–4) season while throwing for 2,680 yards, 19 touchdowns, and nine interceptions in 12 games. In 2010, Cousins led Michigan State to an 11–2 (7–1) record and a share of the Big Ten Conference Championship.

In 2011, the Spartans went 11–3 (7–2) and played in the first-ever Big Ten Football Championship Game. Cousins led the Big Ten Conference in pass completions, pass attempts, and passing yards. He was named second-team All-Big Ten by the coaches, and played his final game as a Michigan State Spartan on January 2, 2012, defeating the Georgia Bulldogs in the Outback Bowl. Cousins' teams posted an undefeated 4–0 record against the in-state rival Michigan Wolverines. He won the 2011 Lowes's Senior CLASS Award.

Cousins majored in kinesiology.

== Professional career ==
Pre-draft measurables
Height	Weight	Arm length	Hand span	Wingspan	40-yard dash	10-yard split	20-yard split	20-yard shuttle	Three-cone drill	Vertical jump	Broad jump	Wonderlic
6 ft 2 5/8 in (1.90 m)	214 lb (97 kg)	31 3/4 in (0.81 m)	9 7/8 in (0.25 m)	6 ft 1 5/8 in (1.87 m)	4.93 s	1.71 s	2.87 s	4.50 s	7.05 s	28.5 in (0.72 m)	9 ft 1 in (2.77 m)	33
All values from NFL Combine

=== Washington Redskins ===
==== 2012 ====
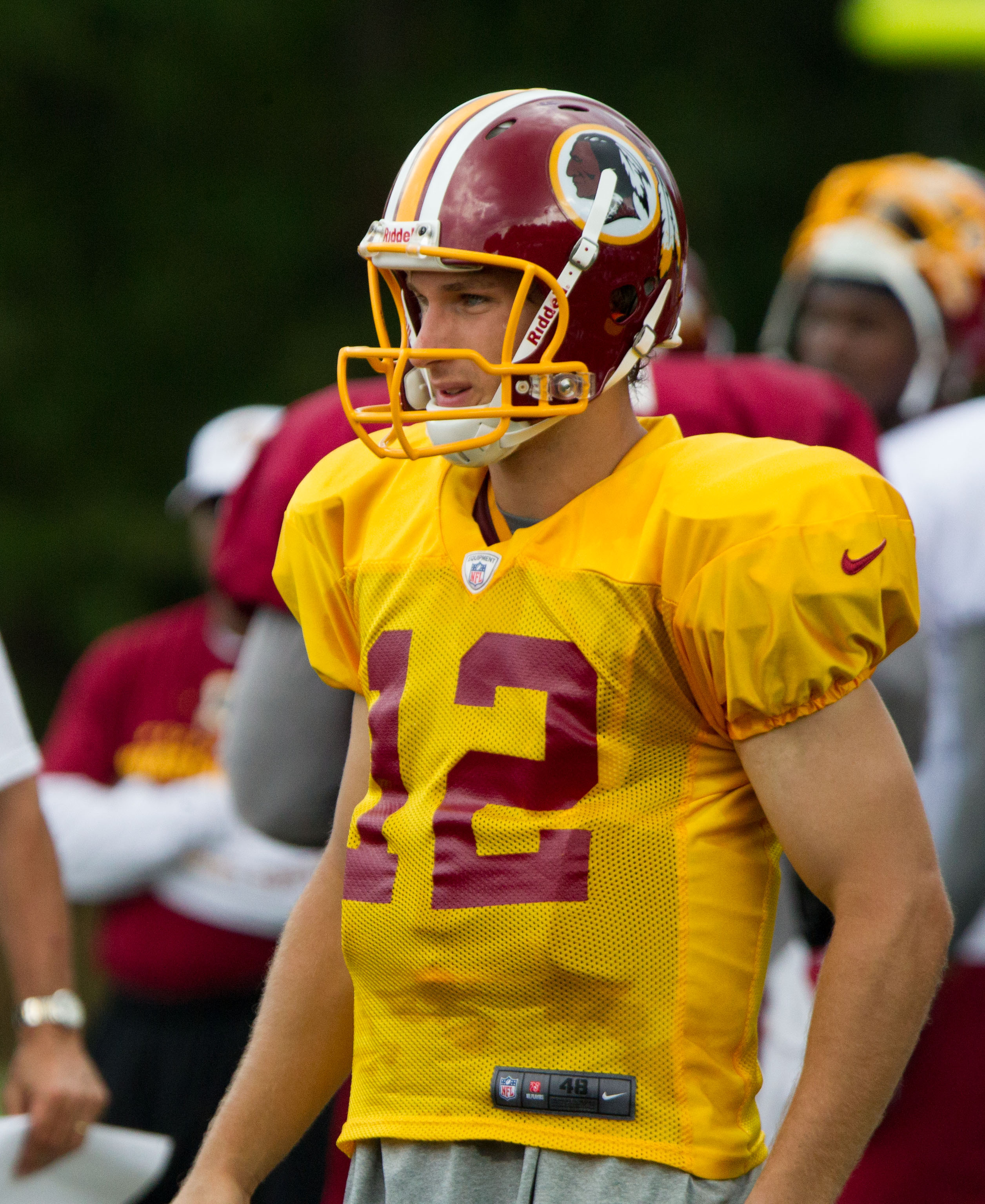
Cousins in 2012

Cousins was selected by the Washington Redskins in the fourth round (102nd overall) of the 2012 NFL draft. The pick surprised many analysts because the Redskins had drafted 2011 Heisman Trophy winner Robert Griffin III with the second overall pick to be their franchise quarterback. The Redskins acquired the Griffin pick by giving the St. Louis Rams four high-value draft picks over three years. Cousins was viewed as an insurance policy in case Griffin was injured, with Redskins head coach Mike Shanahan saying: "You're one or two plays away from being the starter...And if I see that value out there on the third day of the draft, I'm going to take that." The Redskins drafting Griffin and Cousins in the same draft echoed the team's strategy in the 1994 NFL draft, when the team drafted Heath Shuler with the third overall pick and later drafted Gus Frerotte in the seventh round. On May 31, 2012, Cousins signed a four-year contract with the Redskins.

In the second game of the preseason against the Chicago Bears, Cousins threw three touchdowns in the fourth quarter, though the Redskins would go on to narrowly lose 33–31. In the fourth and final game of preseason against the Tampa Bay Buccaneers, he completed 15-of-27 passes for 222 yards as the Redskins won 30–3. Cousins was named the backup quarterback over incumbent starter Rex Grossman.

Cousins made his NFL debut in the third quarter of a Week 5 24–17 loss to the Atlanta Falcons after Griffin suffered a concussion. Cousins threw his first NFL touchdown pass on a 77-yard pass to Santana Moss but threw two interceptions in the last two series of the game while trying to tie the game.

Cousins' second NFL appearance came in Week 14 against the Baltimore Ravens. On the final drive of the game, with the Redskins down by eight points, Griffin suffered a knee injury. Cousins completed both of his passing attempts for 26 yards and finished the drive with an 11-yard touchdown pass to Pierre Garçon with 29 seconds remaining, to bring the Redskins within two points of the Ravens. On the two-point conversion, Shanahan called for a run-pass option, and Cousins scored on a quarterback draw to tie the game at 28. The Redskins would win in overtime 31–28. Cousins was named the starter for the next game against the Cleveland Browns, marking his first NFL start. After a slow first half, Cousins rallied the offense to a 28-point second half. Cousins finished the 38–21 road victory completing 26-of-37 for 329 yards and two touchdowns. He was voted the Pepsi NFL Rookie of the Week, becoming the third Redskins rookie to receive the honor that season (after Griffin and Alfred Morris).

Cousins finished his rookie year with 466 passing yards, four touchdowns, and three interceptions in three games and one start. The Redskins finished atop the NFC East with a 10–6 record. In the Wild Card Round, they faced the Seattle Seahawks. In the 24–14 loss, Cousins came into the game late in the fourth quarter in relief of an injured Griffin. He finished the game completing three of 10 passes for 31 yards.

==== 2013 ====
Cousins made his season debut in Week 8 against the Denver Broncos and finished the 45–21 road loss completing five of nine passes for 48 yards and two interceptions. During Week 14 against the Kansas City Chiefs, Cousins relieved a struggling Robert Griffin III late in the fourth quarter and threw for 59 yards in the 45–10 loss. On December 11, 2013, Cousins was named starting quarterback for the rest of the year after Shanahan deactivated Griffin for the rest of the season in order to protect him for the following year, with Rex Grossman as the backup. Cousins played well in the narrow Week 15 27–26 road loss to the Falcons, completing 29-of-45 passes for 381 yards, three touchdowns, and two interceptions. In the next game against the Dallas Cowboys, he threw for 197 yards, a touchdown, and an interception during the narrow 24–23 loss. Cousins struggled during the regular season finale against the New York Giants, completing 19-of-49 passes for 169 yards and two interceptions in the 20–6 road loss.

Cousins finished his second professional season with 854 passing yards, four touchdowns, and seven interceptions in five games and three starts.

==== 2014 ====
On February 2, 2014, it was reported that Cousins stated that he was open to a trade from the Redskins. In March, Cousins announced that he would be giving the #12 jersey to incoming new wide receiver Andre Roberts for the price of a $12,000 donation to the Kirk Cousins Football Camp. Cousins then switched to the #8 jersey, which he wore throughout his high school and college career.

During Week 2 against the Jacksonville Jaguars, Cousins came in relief of Griffin who left the game with a dislocated ankle. Cousins finished the 41–10 victory with 250 passing yards and two touchdowns. In the next game against the Philadelphia Eagles, he threw for 427 yards, three touchdowns, and in interception during the 37–34 road loss. It was the first game Cousins had over 400 passing yards. The following week against the New York Giants on Thursday Night Football, Cousins had a poor showing, throwing for 257 yards, a touchdown, and four interceptions while also losing a fumble in the 45–14 loss.

During a Week 5 27–17 loss to the defending Super Bowl champion Seahawks, Cousins showed progress from the embarrassing loss to the Giants by throwing for 283 yards and two touchdowns, including a 68-yard touchdown pass to DeSean Jackson. In the next game against the Arizona Cardinals, Cousins had 354 passing yards, two touchdowns, and three interceptions during the 30–20 road loss. The following week against the Tennessee Titans, he recorded 139 passing yards and an interception before being benched at halftime in favor of backup quarterback Colt McCoy, who led the Redskins to a narrow 19–17 victory.

Cousins finished the 2014 season with 1,710 passing yards, 10 touchdowns, and nine interceptions in six games and five starts.

==== 2015 ====
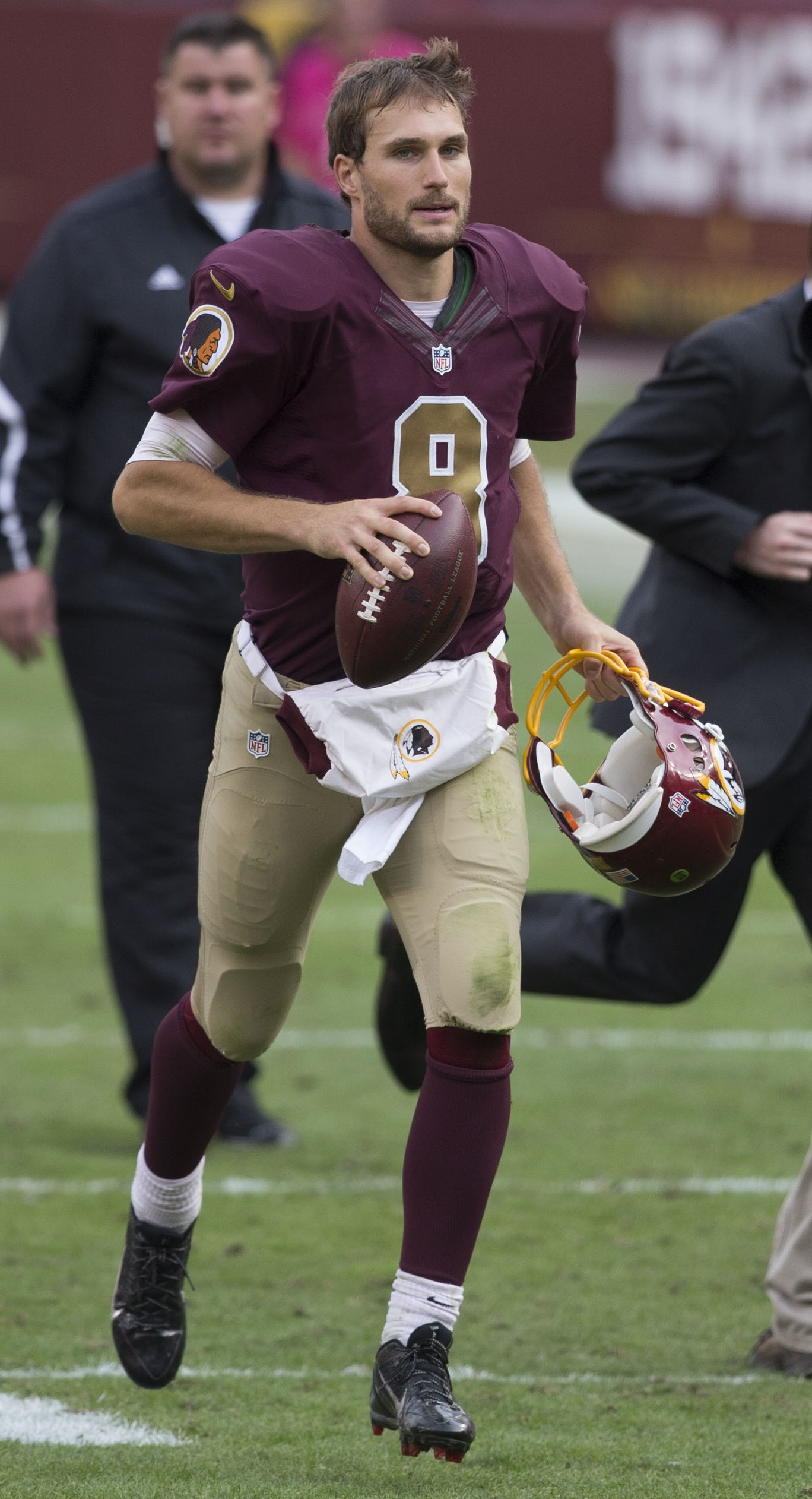
Cousins after the comeback victory against the Buccaneers in 2015

On August 31, 2015, Cousins was named the starter for the season over Robert Griffin III.

Cousins began the season throwing for 196 yards, a touchdown, and two interceptions in the season-opening 17–10 loss to the Miami Dolphins. In the next game against the St. Louis Rams, he completed 23-of-27 passes for 203 yards and a touchdown during the 24–10 victory. The following week against the Giants on Thursday Night Football, Cousins had 316 passing yards, a touchdown, and two interceptions in the 32–21 road loss.

During a Week 4 23–20 victory over the Eagles, Cousins recorded 290 passing yards and a touchdown to go along with a one-yard touchdown. In the next game against the Falcons, he threw for 219 yards, a touchdown, and two interceptions during the 25–19 overtime road loss. The following week against the Jets, Cousins had 196 passing yards, a touchdown, and two interceptions in the 34–20 road loss.

During Week 7 against the Buccaneers, Cousins helped lead the Redskins to their largest comeback victory in franchise history. After being down 24–0 at halftime, Cousins finished the narrow 31–30 victory with 317 passing yards and four total touchdowns (three passing and one rushing) throwing the final touchdown pass to Jordan Reed in the final seconds. Cousins also tied a franchise record for completions in a game with 33, tying Jason Campbell who did the same in 2007. When heading into the locker room after the game, Cousins was caught on camera shouting, "You like that?!" to reporters, which later become a catchphrase used by Cousins, his teammates, and Redskins fans throughout the rest of the season. Cousins and his brother Kyle applied to trademark the catchphrase later in the season and began to sell T-shirts with the phrase to raise money for the International Justice Mission charitable organization. Cousins was named NFC Offensive Player of the Week for his performance against the Buccaneers.

During a Week 9 27–10 road loss to the New England Patriots, Cousins had 217 passing yards, a touchdown, and an interception. In the next game against the New Orleans Saints, he completed 20-of-25 passes for 324 yards and a career-high four touchdowns with a perfect passer rating of 158.3 during the 47–14 victory, making Cousins the first Redskins quarterback since 1950 to do that with at least 20 attempts. (Note: Robert Griffin III posted a perfect passer rating against the Philadelphia Eagles in 2012, but with only 15 attempts) He was named NFC Offensive Player of the Week for his performance against the Saints. The following week against the Carolina Panthers, Cousins threw for 207 yards, a touchdown, and an interception in the 44–16 road loss.

During Week 12 against the Giants, Cousins recorded 302 passing yards and a touchdown to go along with a rushing touchdown in the 20–14 victory. In the next game against the Cowboys on Monday Night Football, he completed 22-of-31 passes for 219 yards and a touchdown during the 19–16 loss. The following week against the Bears, Cousins completed 24-of-31 passes for 300 yards, a touchdown, and an interception while also rushing for 13 yards and a touchdown in the 24–21 road victory.

During a Week 15 35–25 victory over the Buffalo Bills, Cousins completed 22-of-28 passes for 319 yards and four touchdowns while also rushing thrice for 11 yards and a touchdown, marking his second four-touchdown passing game of the season. In the next game against the Eagles, Cousins threw for 365 yards and four touchdowns during the 38–24 road victory as the Redskins won the NFC East division title for the first time since Griffin III did it in 2012. During the regular season finale against the Cowboys, Cousins completed 12-of-15 passes for 176 yards and three touchdowns in the 34–23 road victory before being benched at halftime. He was named NFC Offensive Player of the Month for December.

Cousins finished the 2015 season with a franchise-record for 4,166 passing yards (passing Jay Schroeder who had 4,109 in 1986), 29 touchdowns (second in Redskins history behind Jurgensen who had 31 in 1967), and 11 interceptions to go along with 26 carries for 48 yards and five touchdowns in 16 games and starts. His completion percentage of 69.8% led the league (second in team history behind Sammy Baugh, who completed 70.3% of his passes in 1945) and his completion percentage of 74.7% at home was the highest completion percentage in home games in NFL history, with a minimum of 100 attempts, leading the Redskins to a 6–2 record at home. Cousins also became the first Redskins quarterback since Sonny Jurgensen in 1970 to have at least four passing touchdowns in three or more games in one season.

The Redskins finished atop the NFC East with a 9–7 record and qualified for the playoffs as the #4-seed. During the Wild Card Round against the Green Bay Packers, Cousins completed 29-of-46 passes for 329 yards and a touchdown while also rushing twice for two yards and a touchdown, but was sacked six times and lost a fumble in the 35–18 loss. He was named the PFWA Most Improved Player. Cousins was ranked 85th by his fellow players on the NFL Top 100 Players of 2016.

==== 2016 ====
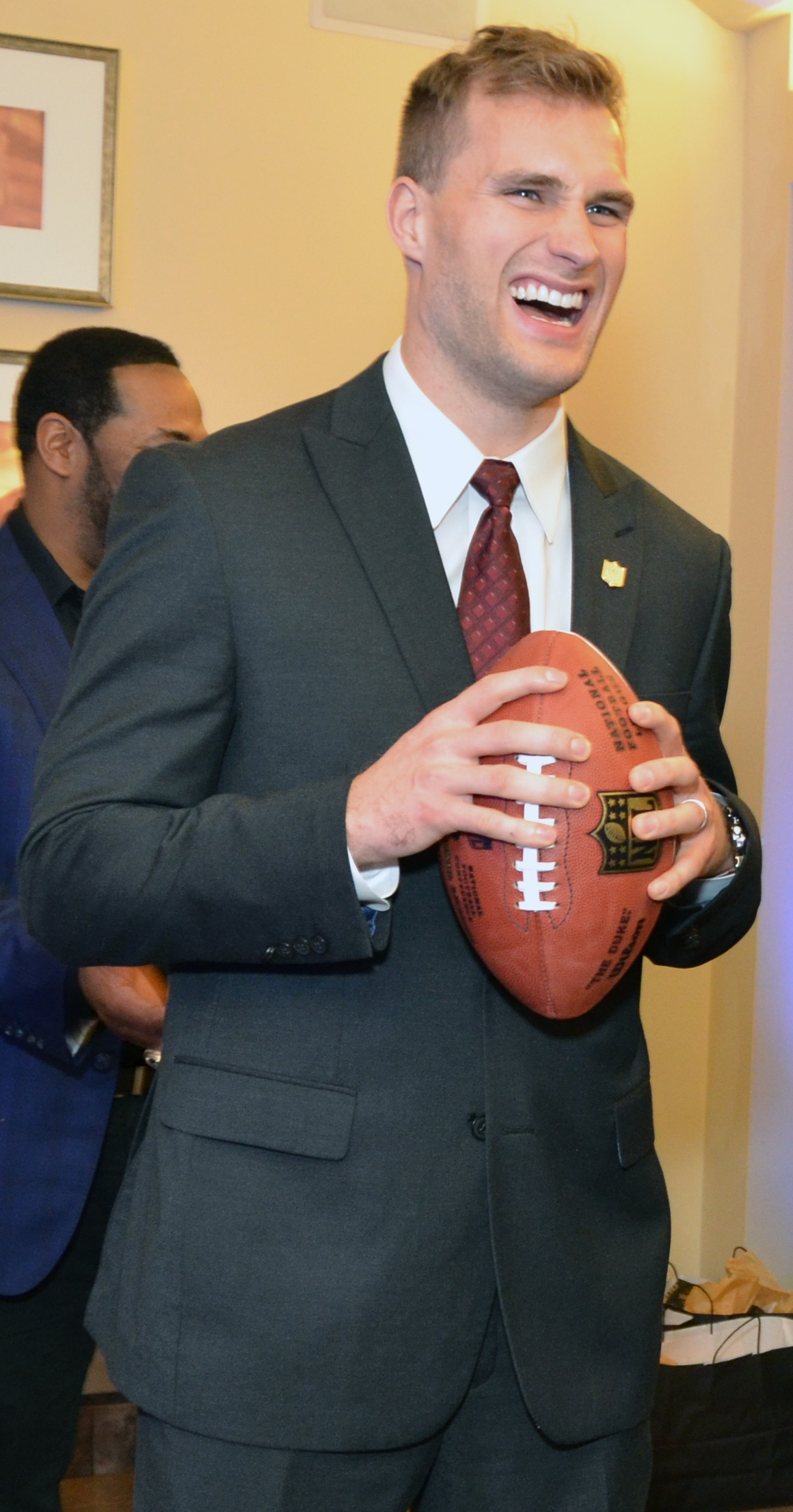
Cousins in 2016

Cousins was set to become an unrestricted free agent in the 2016 offseason, but the Redskins used the non-exclusive franchise tag on him on March 1, 2016. The tag acted as a one-year, $20 million contract, which prevented other teams in the league from signing him without giving up two first round draft picks to the Redskins.

During the season-opening 38–16 loss to the Pittsburgh Steelers on Monday Night Football, Cousins struggled, completing 30-of-43 passes for 329 yards and two interceptions. In the next game against the Cowboys, he threw for 364 yards, a touchdown, and an interception during the 27–23 loss. The following week against the Giants, Cousins recorded 296 passing yards and two touchdowns in the narrow 29–27 road victory.

During Week 4 against the Browns, Cousins completed 21-of-27 passes for 183 yards, three touchdowns, and an interception in the 31–20 victory. In the next game against the Ravens, he completed 29-of-41 passes for 260 yards, a touchdown, and an interception during the 16–10 road victory. The following week against the Eagles, Cousins threw for 263 yards, two touchdowns, and an interception in the 27–20 victory.

During a Week 7 20–17 road loss to the Detroit Lions, Cousins completed 30-of-39 passes for 301 yards and a touchdown and rushed thrice for 15 yards and a touchdown. In the next game against the Cincinnati Bengals at Wembley Stadium in London, Cousins threw for a career-high 458 passing yards, two touchdowns, and an interception during the 27–27 tie. As the game ended in a tie, it also marked the first time a game held in London went into overtime. Following a Week 9 bye, the Redskins returned home to face the Minnesota Vikings. Cousins finished the 26–20 victory with 262 passing yards and three touchdowns.

During Week 11 against the Packers, Cousins completed 21-of-30 passes for 375 yards and three touchdowns in the 42–24 victory. He was named NFC Offensive Player of the Week for his performance. After the game, Cousins was caught on camera asking Redskins general manager Scot McCloughan, "How you like me now?", which many in the media believed Cousins was addressing concerns about his potentially lucrative long-term contract with the team next season. In the next game against the Cowboys on Thanksgiving, Cousins completed 41-of-53 passes for 449 yards and three touchdowns during the 31–26 road loss, putting him second on the list of most passing yards in a Thanksgiving Day game in NFL history. For his accomplishments in the month of November, Cousins was named NFC Offensive Player Of The Month, his second time winning the award. The following week against the Cardinals, he had 271 passing yards, a touchdown, and an interception to go along with a rushing touchdown in the 31–23 road loss.

During a Week 14 27–22 road victory over the Eagles, Cousins threw for 234 yards, two touchdowns, and an interception. In the next game against the Panthers on Monday Night Football, he completed 32-of-47 passes for 315 yards and an interception during the 26–15 loss. The following week against the Bears on Christmas Eve, Cousins recorded 270 passing yards and a touchdown to go along with five carries for 30 yards and two touchdowns in the 41–21 road victory. During the regular season finale against the Giants, he threw for 287 yards, a touchdown, and an interception in the 19–10 loss.

Despite missing the playoffs, Cousins led the Redskins to a winning record of 8–7–1 and finished the 2016 season with a career-high 4,917 passing yards, 25 touchdowns, and 12 interceptions to go along with 34 carries for 96 yards and four touchdowns in 16 games and starts. His 4,917 yards ranked third in the NFL behind Drew Brees and Matt Ryan, breaking various personal and team records he had set the previous year. Cousins' 67% completion percentage ranked seventh and his 45.7% deep-ball completion percentage ranked fifth among NFL quarterbacks in 2016. On January 23, 2017, Cousins was named to his first Pro Bowl, replacing Atlanta Falcons quarterback Matt Ryan, who could not take part in the game due to the Falcons' appearance in Super Bowl LI. During the Pro Bowl game, Cousins played throughout most of the second half, and notably forced a fumble on Broncos cornerback Aqib Talib after chasing him down the field after throwing an interception late in the fourth quarter. Cousins was ranked 70th by his peers on the NFL Top 100 Players of 2017.

==== 2017 ====
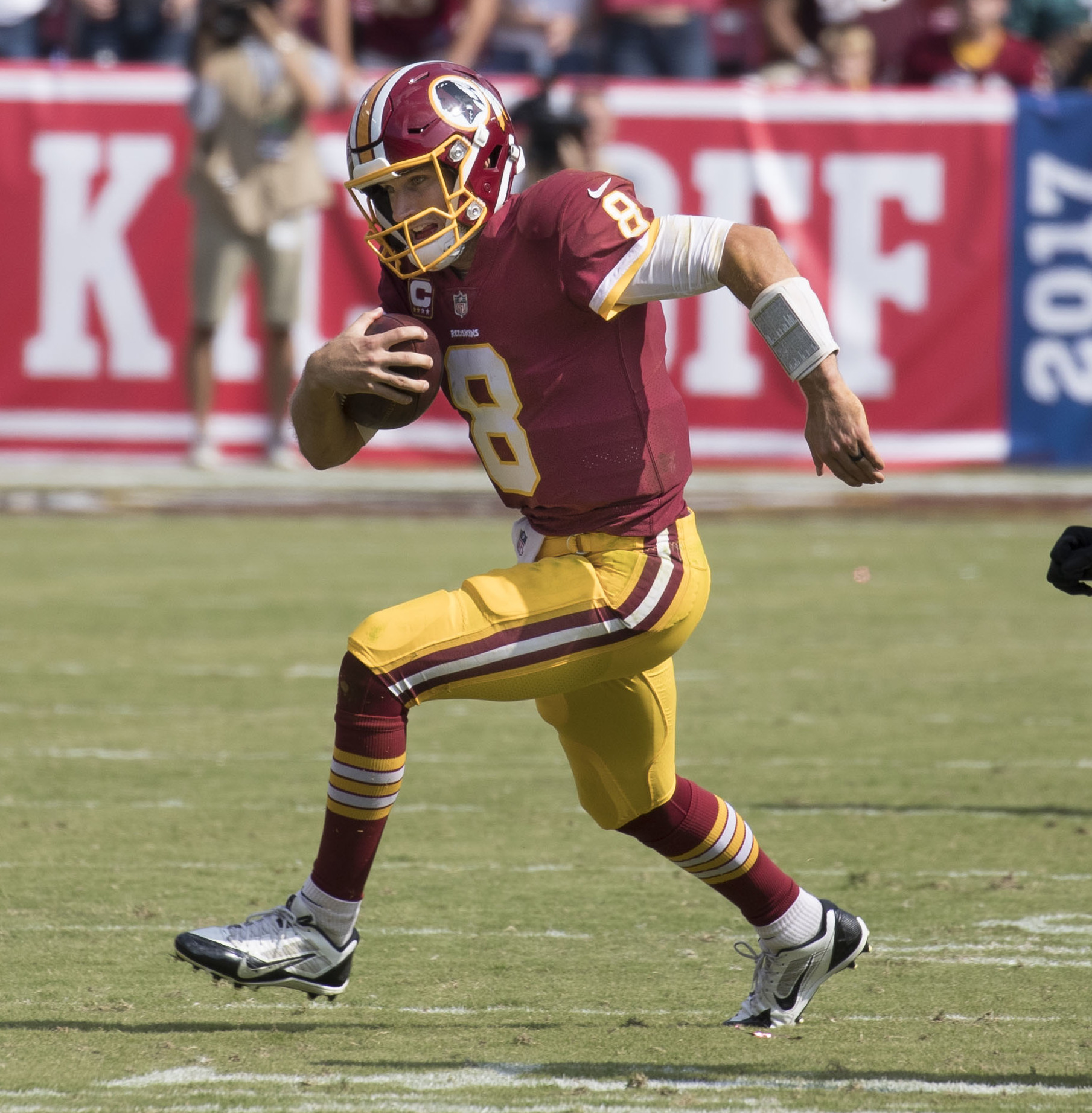
Cousins running in 2017

Again set to become an unrestricted free agent in the offseason, Cousins and the Redskins attempted to work out a long-term deal before the start of free agency, but could only come to an agreement on the exclusive franchise tag on February 28, 2017, becoming the first quarterback in NFL history to be franchise-tagged in consecutive years.

During the season-opener against the Eagles, Cousins recorded 240 passing yards, a touchdown, and an interception in the 30–17 loss. In the next game against the Los Angeles Rams, he threw for 179 yards and a touchdown during the 27–20 road victory. The following week against the Oakland Raiders on Sunday Night Football, Cousins completed 25-for-30 passes for a season-high 365 yards and three touchdowns in the 27–10 victory. He was named NFC Offensive Player of the Week for his performance against the Raiders.

During a Week 4 29–20 road loss to the Chiefs on Monday Night Football, Cousins threw for 220 yards and two touchdowns. Following a Week 5 bye, the Redskins returned home to face the San Francisco 49ers. Cousins finished the narrow 26–24 victory with 330 passing yards, two touchdowns, and an interception to go along with four carries for 26 yards and a touchdown. In the next game against the Eagles on Monday Night Football, he completed 30-of-40 passes for 303 yards, three touchdowns, and an interception during the 34–24 road loss.

During Week 8 against the Cowboys, Cousins had 263 passing yards, a touchdown, and an interception in the 33–19 loss. Two weeks later against the Vikings, he threw for 327 yards, a touchdown, and an interception while also rushing four times for five yards and two touchdowns in the 38–30 loss. In the next game against the Saints, Cousins completed 22-of-32 passes for 322 yards and three touchdowns during the 34–31 overtime road loss.

During a Week 12 20–10 victory over the Giants on Thanksgiving, Cousins threw for 242 yards, two touchdowns, and an interception. In the next game against the Cowboys on Thursday Night Football, he completed 26-of-37 passes for 251 yards, two touchdowns, and two interceptions during the 38–14 road loss. The following week against the Los Angeles Chargers, Cousins recorded 151 passing yards, a touchdown, and an interception in the 30–13 road loss.

During Week 15 against the Cardinals, Cousins completed 18-of-26 passes for 196 yards and two touchdowns in the 20–15 victory. In the next game against the Broncos, he had 299 passing yards, three touchdowns, and an interception during the 27–11 victory. During the regular season finale against the Giants, Cousins threw for 158 yards and three interceptions while also rushing for a 12-yard touchdown in the 18–10 road loss.

Cousins finished the 2017 season with 4,093 passing yards, 27 touchdowns, and 13 interceptions to go along with 49 carries for 179 yards and four touchdowns in 16 games and starts. He was ranked 94th by his peers on the NFL Top 100 Players of 2018.

=== Minnesota Vikings (first stint) ===
==== 2018 ====
On March 15, 2018, Cousins signed with the Vikings on a fully guaranteed three-year contract worth $84 million. This was the first fully guaranteed and, as of signing, highest paying contract in NFL history.

Cousins made his Vikings debut in the season-opening 24–16 victory against the 49ers, throwing for 244 yards and two touchdowns. In the next game against the Packers, he had 425 passing yards, four touchdowns, and an interception during the 29–29 tie. Two weeks later against the Rams on Thursday Night Football, Cousins threw for 422 yards and three touchdowns in the 38–31 road loss.

Despite Cousins' strong statistical start to the season, inconsistency within the offense and coaching staff ended up impacting the Vikings' season. With the Vikings at 6–5–1 going into Week 14 against the Seahawks, the Vikings were still in the playoff hunt, but a 21–7 road loss on Monday Night Football resulted in the firing of offensive coordinator John DeFilippo. The Vikings won their next two games, against the Dolphins and Lions, with Cousins passing for five touchdowns and an interception combined. However, in the regular-season finale against the Bears, the Vikings would have made the playoffs with a victory, but they lost 24–10, with Cousins throwing for 132 yards and a touchdown.

The Vikings entered the 2018 season with strong expectations fresh off an appearance in the NFC Championship Game and Cousins as quarterback, but ultimately missed the playoffs with an 8–7–1 record. Cousins finished his first season with the Vikings with 4,298 passing yards, 30 touchdowns, and 10 interceptions to go along with 44 carries for 123 yards and a touchdown in 16 games and starts. He was ranked 78th by his fellow players on the NFL Top 100 Players of 2019.

==== 2019 ====
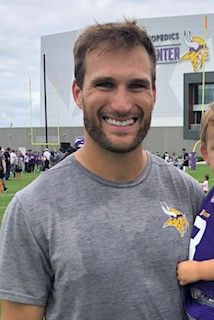
Cousins in 2019

During the season-opener against the Falcons, Cousins completed eight of 10 passes for 98 yards and a touchdown while also rushing for four yards and a touchdown in the 28–12 victory. In the next game against the Packers, he threw for 230 yards, a touchdown, and two interceptions during the 21–16 road loss. The following week against the Raiders, Cousins completed 15-of-21 passes for 174 yards and a touchdown in the 34–14 victory.

During a Week 5 28–10 road victory over the Giants, Cousins completed 22-of-27 passes for 306 yards and two touchdowns. In the next game against the Eagles, he completed 22-of-29 passes for 333 yards, four touchdowns, and an interception during the 38–20 victory. The following week against the Lions, Cousins completed 24-of-34 passes for 337 yards and four touchdowns in the 42–30 road victory. During Week 8 against his former team, the Redskins, on Thursday Night Football, Cousins completed 23-of-26 passes for 285 yards in the 19–9 victory. He was later named NFC Offensive Player of the Month for October.

During Week 9 against the Chiefs, Cousins threw for 220 yards and three touchdowns in the 26–23 road loss. In the next game against the Cowboys on Sunday Night Football, he completed 23-of-32 passes for 220 yards and two touchdowns during the 28–24 road victory. The following week against the Broncos, Cousins completed 29-of-35 passes for 319 yards and three touchdowns in the 27–23 comeback victory. Following a Week 12 bye, the Vikings went on the road to face the Seahawks. Cousins finished the 37–30 loss with 276 passing yards, two touchdowns, and an interception, extending his record on Mondays to an 0–8 record.

During a Week 14 20–7 victory over the Lions, Cousins completed 24-of-30 passes for 242 yards and a touchdown. In the next game against the Chargers, he completed 19-of-25 passes for 207 yards, a touchdown, and an interception during the 39–10 road victory. The following week against the Packers on Monday Night Football, Cousins threw for 122 yards, a touchdown, and an interception in the 23–10 loss. With the loss, the Packers clinched the NFC North division title and Cousins' record on Monday Night Football extended to 0–9. With the Vikings set as the #6-seed in the playoffs, Cousins did not play in the regular-season finale against the Bears.

Cousins finished the 2019 season with 3,603 passing yards, 26 touchdowns, and six interceptions to go along with 31 carries for 63 yards and a touchdown in 15 games and starts. He was also named to his second Pro Bowl. During the Wild Card Round against the Saints, Cousins recorded 242 passing yards and a touchdown in the 26–20 overtime road victory. In the Divisional Round against the 49ers, he threw for 172 yards, a touchdown, and an interception in the 27–10 road loss. Cousins was ranked 58th by his fellow players on the NFL Top 100 Players of 2020.

==== 2020 ====
On March 18, 2020, Cousins signed a two-year, $66 million contract extension with the Vikings.

During the season-opening 43–34 loss to the Packers, Cousins played well, completing 19-of-25 passes for 259 yards, two touchdowns, and an interception. However, he struggled in the next game against the Indianapolis Colts, completing 11-of-26 passes for 113 yards and three interceptions. Cousins finished the 28–11 road loss with a total quarterback rating of 15.9, the third-lowest mark in Vikings franchise history. The following week against the Titans, Cousins had a much better outing as he threw for 251 yards, three touchdowns, and two interceptions during the narrow 31–30 loss.

During Week 4 against the Houston Texans, Cousins completed 16-of-22 passes for 260 yards and a touchdown during the 31–23 road victory, the Vikings' first win of the season. In the next game against the Seahawks on Sunday Night Football, he had 249 passing yards, two touchdowns, and an interception during the narrow 27–26 road loss. The following week later against the Falcons, Cousins threw for 343 yards, three touchdowns, and three interceptions in the 40–23 loss.

Following a Week 7 bye, the Vikings went on the road to face the Packers. Cousins finished the 28–22 victory completing 11-of-14 passes for 160 yards and a touchdown. In the next game against the Lions, he threw for 220 yards and three touchdowns on only 13 completions during the 34–20 victory. The following week against the Bears on Monday Night Football, Cousins recorded 292 passing yards, two touchdowns, and an interception in the 19–13 road victory, marking his first ever Monday Night Football win after previously going 0–9.

During Week 11 against the Cowboys, Cousins completed 22-of-30 passes for 318 yards and three touchdowns in the 31–28 loss. In the next game against the Panthers, he completed 34-of-45 passes for 307 yards and three touchdowns during the narrow 28–27 comeback victory, marking his fourth straight game with a passer rating over 100. Cousins was named the NFC Offensive Player of the Week for his performance against the Panthers. The following week against the Jaguars, Cousins threw for 305 yards, three touchdowns, and an interception in the 27–24 overtime victory.

During a Week 14 26–14 road loss to the Buccaneers, Cousins had 225 passing yards and a touchdown. In the next game against the Bears, he threw for 271 yards, two touchdowns, and an interception during the 33–27 loss. The following week against the Saints on Christmas Day, he recorded 291 passing yards and three touchdowns in the 52–33 road loss, eliminating the Vikings from postseason contention. During the regular-season finale against the Lions, Cousins completed 28-of-40 passes for 405 yards and three touchdowns while also rushing for a touchdown in the narrow 37–35 road victory. He was named the NFC Offensive Player of the Week for his performance against the Lions.

Cousins finished the season with 4,265 passing yards, 35 touchdowns, and 13 interceptions to go along with 32 carries for 156 yards and a touchdown in 16 games and starts.

==== 2021 ====
Cousins began the season completing 36-of-49 passes for 351 yards and two touchdowns in a 27–24 overtime road loss to the Bengals in the season-opener. In the next game against the Cardinals, he threw for 244 yards and three touchdowns during the narrow 34–33 road loss. The following week against the Seahawks, Cousins completed 30-of-38 passes for 323 yards and three touchdowns in the 30–17 victory.

During a narrow Week 5 19–17 victory over the Lions, Cousins completed 25-of-34 passes for 275 yards, a touchdown, and an interception. In the next game against the Panthers, he recorded 373 passing yards and three touchdowns during the 34–28 road victory. Following a Week 7 bye, the Vikings returned home to face the Cowboys on Sunday Night Football. Cousins finished the 20–16 loss with 184 passing yards and a touchdown. In the next game against the Ravens, Cousins threw for 187 yards and two touchdowns while also rushing for a one-yard rushing touchdown during the 34–31 overtime road loss.

During Week 10 against the Chargers, Cousins had 294 passing yards and two touchdowns in the 27–20 road victory. In the next game against the Packers, he completed 24-of-35 passes for 341 yards and three touchdowns during the 34–31 victory. The following week against the 49ers, Cousins threw for 238 yards, two touchdowns, and an interception in the 34–26 road loss.

During a narrow Week 13 29–27 road loss to the Lions, Cousins completed 30-of-40 passes for 340 yards and two touchdowns. In the next game against the Steelers on Thursday Night Football, he had 216 passing yards, two touchdowns, and two interceptions during the 36–28 loss. The following week against the Bears on Monday Night Football, Cousins threw for 87 yards, two touchdowns, and an interception in the 17–9 road victory.

During Week 16 against the Rams, Cousins completed 27-of-38 passes for 315 yards, a touchdown, and an interception in the 30–23 loss. However, Cousins drew controversy over his decision not to receive the COVID-19 vaccination, although he agreed to follow NFL protocols. In response to his comments, which drew from a personal decision, Holland Hospital, with whom Cousins had served as spokesperson, announced that they were discontinuing Cousins' role indefinitely. Prior to Week 17, Cousins was placed on the COVID-19 reserve list and ruled out for the game against the Packers, which the Vikings lost 37–10, eliminating them from playoff contention. In the regular season finale against the Bears, Cousins recorded 250 passing yards and three touchdowns during the 31–17 victory.

Cousins finished the 2021 season with 4,221 passing yards, 33 touchdowns, and seven interceptions to go along with 29 carries for 115 yards and a touchdown in 16 games and starts. He was named to his third Pro Bowl. Cousins was ranked 99th by his fellow players on the NFL Top 100 Players of 2022.

==== 2022 ====
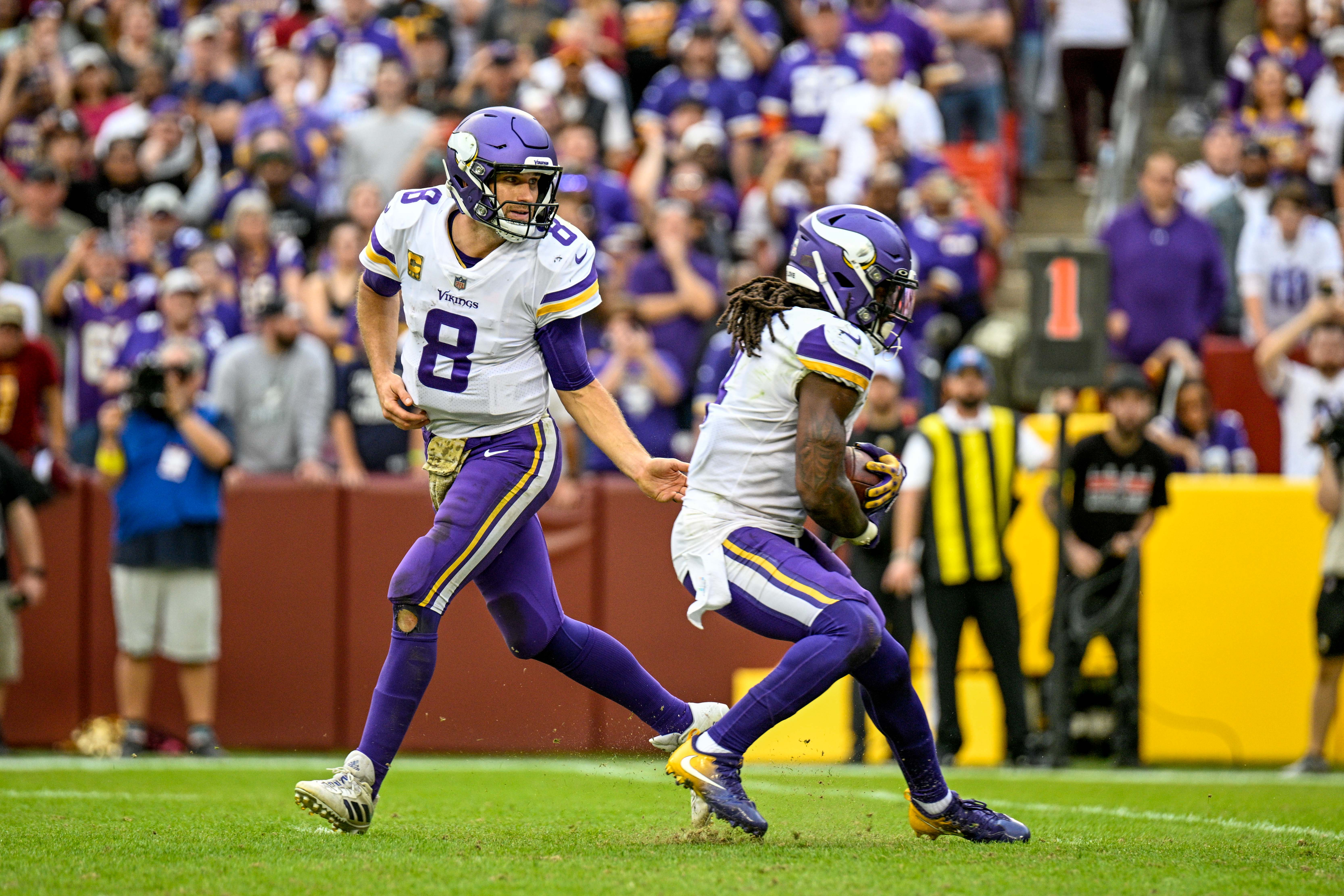
Cousins handing the ball off to Dalvin Cook in 2022

On March 13, 2022, Cousins signed a one-year, $35 million fully guaranteed contract extension through the 2023 season.

During the season-opening 23–7 victory over the Packers, Cousins completed 23-of-32 passes for 277 yards and two touchdowns for a 118.9 passer rating. In the next game against the Eagles on Monday Night Football, he threw for 221 yards, a touchdown, and three interceptions during the 24–7 road loss. The following week against the Lions, Cousins had 260 passing yards and two touchdowns in the 28–24 victory.

During Week 4 against the Saints in London, Cousins threw for 273 yards, a touchdown, and an interception in the 28–25 victory. In the next game against the Bears, he completed a one-yard touchdown pass to Jalen Reagor for his 19th consecutive completion (17 to open to game, and two from Week 4 against the Saints), breaking Tommy Kramer's team record of 16 consecutive completions during the 1979 season. Cousins finished the 29–22 victory completing 32-of-41 passes for 296 yards, a touchdown, and an interception to go along with four carries for four yards and a touchdown. The following week against the Dolphins, Cousins threw for 175 yards and two touchdowns during the 24–16 road victory.

Following a Week 7 bye, the Vikings returned home to face the Cardinals. Cousins finished the 34–26 victory with 232 passing yards and two touchdowns. In the next game against his former team, the Washington Commanders, Cousins threw for 265 yards, two touchdowns, and two interceptions during the 20–17 road victory. The following week against the Bills, Cousins recorded 357 passing yards, a touchdown, and two interceptions in the 33–30 overtime road victory.

During a Week 12 33–26 victory over the Patriots on Thanksgiving, Cousins completed 30-of-37 passes for 299 yards, three touchdowns, and an interception. In the next game against the Jets, he had 173 passing yards and a touchdown during the 27–22 victory. The following week against the Lions, Cousins completed 31-of-41 passes for 425 yards and two touchdowns in the 34–23 road loss.

During Week 15 against the Colts, Cousins recorded a career-high 460 passing yards, four touchdowns, and two interceptions with a 99.3 passer rating in the 39–36 overtime victory, highlighted by the Vikings completing the largest comeback in NFL history. With the victory, the Vikings also clinched the NFC North for the first time since 2017. Cousins was named NFC Offensive Player of the Week for his performance. In the next game against the Giants on Christmas Eve, Cousins completed 34-of-48 passes for 299 yards and three touchdowns during the 27–24 victory, where he orchestrated a last-minute drive that culminated in kicker Greg Joseph making the longest field goal in Vikings history, a 61-yard attempt. Cousins struggled the following week against the Packers, throwing for 205 yards, a touchdown, and three interceptions in the 41–17 road loss. During the regular season finale against the Bears, he completed 17-of-20 passes for 225 yards and a touchdown before being benched at halftime in the 29–13 road victory.

Cousins finished the 2022 season with 4,547 passing yards, 29 touchdowns, and 14 interceptions to go along with 31 carries for 97 yards and two touchdowns in 17 games and starts. His eight game-winning drives led the NFL for the 2022 season and tied the NFL record (since 1960) for a single season with Matthew Stafford's 2016 season. Cousins was named to his fourth Pro Bowl. The Vikings finished atop the NFC North with a 13–4 record and qualified for the playoffs as the #3-seed. During the Wild Card Round against the Giants, Cousins had a solid individual game, completing 31-of-39 passes for 273 yards and two touchdowns while also rushing for a one-yard touchdown. Despite his efforts, the Vikings defense was stymied by a Giants offense led by Daniel Jones, who threw for 301 yards and two touchdowns, with an additional 78 rushing yards, defeating the Vikings 31–24.

==== 2023 ====
During the season opener against the Buccaneers, Cousins completed 33-of-44 passes for 344 yards, two touchdowns to Jordan Addison, and an interception in the 20–17 loss. In the next game against the Eagles on Thursday Night Football, Cousins completed 31-of-44 passes for 364 yards and four touchdowns during the 34–28 road loss. The following week against the Chargers, Cousins threw for 367 yards, three touchdowns, and a late interception in the end zone that sealed the 28–24 loss.

During a Week 4 21–13 road victory over the Panthers, Cousins threw for 139 yards while overcoming two interceptions, including a 99-yard pick six, and threw two touchdowns to Justin Jefferson. In the next game against the defending Super Bowl champion Chiefs, Cousins had 284 passing yards and two touchdowns during the 27–20 loss. The following week against the Bears, he completed 21-of-31 passes for 181 yards and a 10-yard pass touchdown to Jordan Addison in the 19–13 road victory.

During Week 7 against the 49ers on Monday Night Football, Cousins completed 35-of-45 passes for 378 yards, two touchdowns, and an interception in the 22–17 victory. In the next game against the Packers, he completed 23-of-31 passes for 274 yards and two touchdowns before leaving the eventual 24–10 road victory with a leg injury. It was later revealed that Cousins tore his Achilles tendon, prematurely ending his season. Cousins was placed on injured reserve on October 31. Without him, the Vikings finished with a 7–10 record and missed the playoffs.

Cousins finished the 2023 season with 2,331 passing yards, 18 touchdowns, and five interceptions in eight games and starts.

=== Atlanta Falcons ===
==== 2024 ====
On March 13, 2024, Cousins signed a four-year, $180 million contract with the Atlanta Falcons. The day after his signing became official, reports began to surface that the Falcons were suspected to have tampered with Cousins, which prompted the league to penalize the Falcons after an investigation. On April 25, the Falcons drafted quarterback Michael Penix Jr. with their first-round selection (eighth overall) in the 2024 NFL draft. The Falcons did not notify Cousins or his agent of the decision until they were on the clock with their pick.

Cousins made his Falcons debut in the season-opening 18–10 loss to the Steelers, completing 16-of-26 passes for 155 yards, a touchdown, and two interceptions. In the next game against the Eagles on Monday Night Football, Cousins threw for 241 yards and two touchdowns. With under two minutes left and no timeouts, he mounted a game-winning, 70-yard touchdown drive as the Falcons narrowly won on the road 22–21. After averaging just under 220 passing yards through his first four games, Cousins completed 42-of-58 passes for a career-high and a Falcons franchise record 509 yards and four touchdowns during a Week 5 36–30 overtime victory over the Buccaneers, surpassing the previous record of 503 yards set by Matt Ryan.

During Week 6 against the Panthers, Cousins recorded 225 passing yards and a touchdown in the 38–20 road victory. In the next game against the Seahawks, he threw for 232 yards, a touchdown, and two interceptions during the 34–14 loss. The following week against the Buccaneers, Cousins completed 23-of-29 passes for 276 yards and four touchdowns in the 31–26 road victory. He was named NFC Offensive Player of the Week for his performance against the Buccaneers.

After completing 19-of-24 passes for 222 yards and three touchdowns with a 144.8 passer rating during a Week 9 27–21 victory over the Cowboys to improve to 6–3, Cousins failed to record a passing touchdown in back-to-back losses to the Saints and Broncos, a career first. Following a Week 12 bye, he tied his career-high with four interceptions in a 17–13 loss to the Chargers, followed by two more interceptions and his fourth consecutive game without a touchdown during a 42–21 road loss to his former team, the Vikings. During Week 15, Cousins passed for a season-low 112 yards and an interception against the Las Vegas Raiders but ended his touchdown drought in a 15–9 victory that snapped Atlanta's losing streak. The next day, head coach Raheem Morris announced that Penix would replace Cousins as the starting quarterback, beginning in Week 16. Prior to his benching, Cousins led the league with 16 interceptions and was tied for the league-lead in fumbles. After the season, Cousins revealed that he suffered a shoulder injury in Week 10 against the Saints, resulting in his significant decline in performance during the 1–4 stretch after the 6–3 start.

Cousins finished the 2024 season with 3,508 passing yards, 18 touchdowns, and a league-leading 16 interceptions in 14 games and starts.

==== 2025 ====
During the offseason, Cousins was named the second-string quarterback behind Penix.

During a Week 3 30–0 shutout road loss to the Panthers, Cousins relieved Penix in the fourth quarter and completed five of seven passes for 29 yards. During Week 11 against the Panthers, Cousins made an appearance in relief of Penix, who exited the game due to a knee injury in the third quarter. He finished the 30–27 overtime loss with 48 passing yards. On November 17, Cousins was named the starting quarterback for at least the next four games after Penix was placed on injured reserve. Two days later, Cousins was named the starter for the rest of the season after Penix had season-ending surgery.

During Week 12 against the Saints, Cousins completed 16-of-23 passes for 199 yards, two touchdowns, and an interception in the 24–10 road victory. In the next game against the Jets, he threw for 234 yards and a touchdown during the 27–24 road loss. The following week against the Seahawks, Cousins had 162 passing yards and two interceptions in the 37–9 loss.

During a narrow Week 15 29–28 road victory over the Buccaneers on Thursday Night Football, Cousins completed 30-of-44 passes for 373 yards and three touchdowns. In the next game against the Cardinals, he recorded 197 passing yards, two touchdowns, and an interception to go along with a rushing touchdown during the 26–19 road victory. The following week against the Rams on Monday Night Football, Cousins threw for 126 yards and a touchdown in the 27–24 victory. During the regular season finale against the Saints, he had 180 passing yards, a touchdown, and an interception in the narrow 19–17 victory.

Cousins finished the 2025 season with 1,721 passing yards, 10 touchdowns, and five interceptions to go along with seven rushing yards and a touchdown in 10 games and eight starts. In February 2026, the Falcons announced their intentions to release Cousins at the start of the impending free agency period, and he was officially released on March 11.

=== Las Vegas Raiders ===
On April 6, 2026, the Las Vegas Raiders signed Cousins to a five-year contract worth up to $172 million, $20 million of which is fully guaranteed; the Falcons will pay $8.7 million of that money, while the Raiders will pay Cousins the veteran minimum salary of $1.3 million in addition to a $10 million signing bonus. On September 2, Cousins was named the starter over rookie Fernando Mendoza to begin the season.

During the season-opening 27–13 victory over the Dolphins, Cousins made his Raiders debut and completed 21-of-30 passes for 160 yards, three touchdowns, and two interceptions. With a touchdown pass to Ashton Jeanty, Cousins achieved 300 career touchdowns, surpassing John Elway. In the next game against the Chargers, Cousins recorded 253 passing yards, three touchdowns, and an interception during the 26–14 road victory. The following week against the Saints, he threw for 248 yards and three touchdowns in the 35–27 road victory.

During Week 4 against the Chiefs, Cousins had 365 passing yards, two touchdowns, and an interception in the 30–27 loss. In the next game against the Patriots, he threw for 243 yards and a touchdown during the 45–17 road loss. The following week against the Bills, Cousins recorded 313 passing yards, two touchdowns, and an interception in the 33–30 loss.

During a Week 7 35–21 loss to the Rams, Cousins had 295 passing yards and two touchdowns. In the next game against the Jets, he completed 19-of-26 passes for 247 yards and three touchdowns and rushed for another touchdown during the 38–33 road victory. The following week against the 49ers, Cousins struggled, throwing for 216 yards, a touchdown, and three interceptions while also rushing for a touchdown in the 38–17 road loss.

=== Minnesota Vikings (second stint) ===
On November 10, 2026, Cousins was traded to the Vikings in exchange for a 2027 third-round pick. He was able to wear his No. 8 jersey after rookie safety Jakobe Thomas switched to No. 6.

On November 13, Vikings head coach Kevin O'Connell named Cousins the starter for the Week 10 matchup against the Packers. Cousins finished the 30–10 road victory completing 21-of-31 passes for 207 yards, two touchdowns, and an interception. Since he was traded after Minnesota's bye week and before Las Vegas' bye, Cousins could become the first NFL quarterback to start 18 regular season games in a season.

== Career statistics ==
Legend
	Led the league
**Bold**	Career high

=== NFL ===
==== Regular season ====
Year	Team	Games			Passing									Rushing					Sacks		Fumbles	
Year	Team	GP	GS	Record	Cmp	Att	Pct	Yds	Y/A	Lng	TD	Int	Rtg	Att	Yds	Y/A	Lng	TD	Sck	Yds	Fum	Lost
2012	WAS	3	1	**1–0**	33	48	68.8	466	**9.7**	77	4	3	101.6	3	22	7.3	17	0	3	27	1	0
2013	WAS	5	3	0–3	81	155	52.3	854	5.5	62	4	7	58.4	4	14	3.5	6	0	5	32	3	2
2014	WAS	6	5	1–4	126	204	61.8	1,710	8.4	**81**	10	9	86.4	7	20	2.9	12	0	8	70	2	2
2015	WAS	16	16	9–7	379	543	69.8	4,166	7.7	78	29	11	101.6	26	48	1.8	13	**5**	26	186	9	3
2016	WAS	16	16	8–7–1	406	606	67.0	**4,917**	8.1	80	25	12	97.2	34	96	2.8	19	4	23	190	9	3
2017	WAS	16	16	7–9	347	540	64.3	4,093	7.6	74	27	13	93.9	**49**	**179**	3.7	18	4	41	**342**	**13**	5
2018	MIN	16	16	8–7–1	**425**	606	**70.1**	4,298	7.1	75	30	10	99.7	44	123	2.8	19	1	40	262	9	**7**
2019	MIN	15	15	10–5	307	444	69.1	3,603	8.1	66	26	6	**107.4**	31	63	2.0	14	1	28	206	10	3
2020	MIN	16	16	7–9	349	516	67.6	4,265	8.3	71	**35**	13	105.0	32	156	**4.9**	16	1	39	256	9	5
2021	MIN	16	16	8–8	372	561	66.3	4,221	7.5	64	33	7	103.1	29	115	4.0	**29**	1	28	197	12	2
2022	MIN	17	17	13–4	424	**643**	65.9	4,547	7.1	66	29	14	92.5	31	97	3.1	19	2	**46**	329	7	3
2023	MIN	8	8	4–4	216	311	69.5	2,331	7.5	62	18	5	103.8	14	25	1.8	10	0	17	110	7	4
2024	ATL	14	14	7–7	303	453	66.9	3,508	7.7	60	18	**16**	88.6	23	0	0.0	13	0	28	201	**13**	2
2025	ATL	10	8	5–3	166	269	61.7	1,721	6.4	49	10	5	84.8	14	7	0.5	6	1	13	79	3	0
2026	LV	9	9	4–5	202	315	64.1	2,340	7.4	45	20	8	97.1	22	7	0.3	5	2	11	64	3	0
2026	MIN	1	1	1–0	21	31	67.7	207	6.7	38	2	1	94.4	3	11	3.7	8	0	3	24	0	0
Career		184	177	93–82–2	4,157	6,245	66.6	47,247	7.6	81	320	140	96.8	366	983	2.7	29	22	359	2,575	110	41

==== Postseason ====
Year	Team	Games			Passing									Rushing					Sacks		Fumbles	
Year	Team	GP	GS	Record	Cmp	Att	Pct	Yds	Y/A	Lng	TD	Int	Rtg	Att	Yds	Y/A	Lng	TD	Sck	Yds	Fum	Lost
2012	WAS	1	0	—	3	10	30.0	31	3.1	15	0	0	40.0	1	0	0.0	0	0	0	0	1	0
2015	WAS	1	1	0–1	29	46	63.0	329	**7.2**	38	1	0	91.7	**2**	**2**	**1.0**	**3**	**1**	6	**59**	**3**	**1**
2019	MIN	2	2	**1–1**	**40**	**60**	66.7	**414**	6.9	**43**	**2**	**1**	90.6	**2**	−1	−0.5	0	0	**8**	56	1	0
2022	MIN	1	1	0–1	31	39	**79.5**	273	7.0	28	**2**	0	**112.9**	1	1	**1.0**	1	**1**	0	0	0	0
Career		5	4	1–3	103	155	66.5	1,047	6.8	43	5	1	93.7	6	2	0.3	3	2	14	115	5	1

=== College ===
Season	Team	Games			Passing							Rushing			
Season	Team	GP	GS	Record	Cmp	Att	Pct	Yds	TD	Int	Rtg	Att	Yds	Avg	TD
2007	Michigan State	0	0	—	(redshirt) Redshirted										
2008	Michigan State	5	0	—	32	43	**74.4**	310	2	1	145.7	3	-12	-4.0	0
2009	Michigan State	13	12	5–7	198	328	60.4	2,680	19	9	142.6	31	**60**	**1.9**	0
2010	Michigan State	13	13	**11–2**	226	338	66.9	2,825	20	**10**	**150.7**	**40**	-136	-3.4	**1**
2011	Michigan State	14	14	11–3	**267**	**419**	63.7	**3,316**	**25**	**10**	145.1	37	-39	-1.1	0
Career		45	39	27–12	723	1,128	64.1	9,131	66	30	146.1	111	-127	-1.1	1

== Career highlights ==
=== Awards and honors ===
NFL

- 4× Pro Bowl (2016, 2019, 2021, 2022)
- NFL completion percentage leader (2015)
- Bart Starr Award (2023)
- PFWA Most Improved Player (2015)
- 8× NFL Top 100 — 85th (2016), 70th (2017), 94th (2018), 78th (2019), 58th (2020), 99th (2022), 42nd (2023), 81st (2024)
- 3× NFC Offensive Player of the Month (December 2015, November 2016, October 2019)
- 9× NFC Offensive Player of the Week (Week 7, 2015; Week 10, 2015; Week 11, 2016; Week 3, 2017; Week 12, 2020; Week 17, 2020; Week 15, 2022; Week 5, 2024; Week 8, 2024)

College

- Second-team All-Big Ten (2011)

=== Records ===
==== NFL records ====
- Most game-winning drives in a single season: 8 (tied with Matthew Stafford)
- Most fourth-quarter comebacks in a single season: 8 (tied with Matthew Stafford)
- Only quarterback in NFL history to throw for at least 450 yards in a game with three different teams

==== Atlanta Falcons franchise records ====
- Most passing yards in a game: 509

==== Minnesota Vikings franchise records ====
- Most pass completions in a regular season: 425
- Most consecutive games with a passing touchdown: 39
- Most consecutive pass attempts without an interception: 224
- Most consecutive pass completions to start a game: 17

==== Washington Redskins/Commanders franchise records ====
- Most 300-yard passing games in a season: 7 (2015, 2016)
- Most 300-yard passing games in career: 23
- Most pass completions in a regular season: 406
- Most pass attempts in a regular season: 606
- Most consecutive passes without an interception at home: 232
- Most 400-yard passing games in career: 3
- Most 4,000-yard passing seasons: 3
- Most consecutive 4,000-yard passing seasons: 3
- Most passing yards in a season: 4,917

== Personal life ==
Cousins is a practicing Evangelical Christian. He married Julie Hampton on June 28, 2014, in Atlanta, Georgia. As of 2026, they have two sons.

During his time with the Redskins, Cousins earned the nickname "Captain Kirk" from the media for his presence as a leader, referencing the Star Trek character.

Cousins is a cousin of Major League Baseball pitcher Jake Cousins. He has supported Compassion International and its "Fill the Stadium" initiative.

Cousins was recorded on and off the field during the 2022 and 2024 NFL season for a Netflix and NFL Films documentary series, Quarterback, which debuted on Netflix on July 12, 2023 (Season 1) and July 12, 2025 (Season 2).
