= University of Michigan Health - Sparrow Lansing =

- University of Michigan Health - Sparrow
- Shown in Michigan

Geography
- Location: Lansing, Michigan, United States
- Coordinates: 42.7342°N 84.5351°W

Organization
- Type: Teaching
- Affiliated university: MSU College of Human Medicine, MSU College of Osteopathic Medicine

Services
- Emergency department: Level I trauma center
- Beds: 733

Helipads
- Helipad: FAA LID: 08MI

History
- Founded: 1896

Links
- Website: www.uofmhealthsparrow.org/our-hospitals-services/um-health-sparrow-hospitals/lansing
- Lists: Hospitals in Michigan

University of Michigan Health - Sparrow Lansing is a 733-bed teaching hospital located in Lansing, Michigan that provides care for the greater Mid-Michigan region. The hospital is a subsidiary of University of Michigan Health - Sparrow, and is affiliated with the Colleges of Human Medicine and Osteopathic Medicine at nearby Michigan State University. University of Michigan Health - Sparrow Lansing operates the only dedicated pediatric and adult emergency department in the region. The emergency department is a level I trauma center, as verified by the American College of Surgeons. It is also a Joint Commission certified Comprehensive Stroke Center. University of Michigan Health - Sparrow Lansing also has modern operating rooms, multiple helipads, an oncology center, heart and vascular center, and orthopedic department. In addition, 4,500 births are performed annually.

== History ==
University of Michigan Health - Sparrow Lansing was founded in 1896, when the Women's Hospital Association supported one doctor and one nurse out of a rented house.

In 1910, Lansing developer Edward W. Sparrow donated land on East Michigan Avenue near the Michigan State Capitol and $100,000 to help build the hospital. The hospital opened in 1912.

In 2008, a 10-story addition, the Sparrow Tower, was completed. The $160 million, 450,000-square-foot (42,000 m^{2}) addition houses the hospital's emergency departments.

The Herbert-Herman Cancer Center opened on July 17, 2017. The 132,000-square-foot facility, located across Michigan Avenue from the Sparrow Tower, offers state-of-the-art cancer treatment with the help of three linear accelerators for radiation treatment. It also has 40 chemotherapy bays. Breast cancer survivor Judi Herbert, who along with her husband, Jim, and Dr. James and Susan Herman, donated a combined $2.5 million to the development of the center. The art of healing is an important factor in the $64-million cancer center, which has roughly $600,000 worth of art decorating the walls and ceiling.

== See also ==
- List of hospitals in Michigan
