= St. John Riverview Hospital =

St. John Detroit Riverview hospital

- St. John Health System

Geography
- Location: Jefferson Avenue, Detroit, Michigan, United States
- Coordinates: 42.3509°N 82.9982°W

History
- Closed: 2007

Links
- Website: stjohn.org
- Lists: Hospitals in Michigan

St. John Detroit Riverview Hospital was a hospital controlled by the St. John Health System. It was located on Jefferson Avenue on the east side of Detroit, near Belle Isle.

== History ==
Prior to the closure of the hospital in 2007, 30,000 patients used the emergency department each year.

In April 2007, the Barbara Ann Karmanos Cancer Institute revealed intentions to acquire the Riverview hospital facility. The institute aimed to relocate all of its clinical operations to the Riverview facility within 18 months and abandon existing plans to construct a 122-person cancer hospital in the Detroit Medical Center.

The St. John Riverview Hospital faced financial challenges within the hospital system, leading to plans for its closure by the end of June 2007. However, this decision sparked protests from clergy, medical leaders, and the worker union, who argued that it would result in the loss of hundreds of jobs and impede healthcare access to thousands of local residents. In May 2007, discussions were scheduled between the hospital officials, union leaders, religious leaders, and the representatives from the Detroit City Council to address the potential consequences of the hospital's closure. Ultimately, the St. John Riverview Hospital closed that year, although emergency room services remained operational while the health provider evaluated plans for the campus.

In 2009 Oakland University (OU) announced plans to install a health care worker training center at St. John Riverview.

In 2011 the St. John Providence Health System sold the Riverview Hospital and the St. John Senior Community Center, also in Detroit, to DRSN, an investment group.
