= Mary Free Bed Rehabilitation Hospital =

Geography
- Location: Wealthy Street Southeast, Grand Rapids, Michigan, United States
- Coordinates: 42.955965°N 85.662799°W

Organization
- Type: General, Teaching, Specialist

Services
- Beds: 167

Helipads
- Helipad: No

History
- Founded: 1891; 135 years ago

Links
- Website: https://www.maryfreebed.com/
- Lists: Hospitals in Michigan

Mary Free Bed Rehabilitation Hospital is a 167-bed acute care inpatient rehabilitation hospital for children and adults who have experienced a brain injury, spinal cord injury, stroke, amputation, or other injury or illness requiring physical rehabilitation.

Located in Grand Rapids, Michigan, United States, the not-for-profit hospital expanded from 80 beds to 167 beds in early 2015. Patients come from throughout the Midwest and beyond to recover movement and function through Mary Free Bed's inpatient rehabilitation programs.

In 2014, Mary Free Bed and the Michigan State University College of Human Medicine (MSUCHM) created a partnership to expand Mary Free Bed into a teaching and research hospital. The John F. Butzer Center for Research & Innovation is led by John F. Butzer, MD, who served as Mary Free Bed's chief medical officer for 29 years. MSUCHM also launched the Division of Rehabilitation Medicine in 2014 and named Dr. Butzer as director.

== History ==
The institution began in 1891 in order to help those who could not afford medical care. A group of women in the Grand Rapids area passed around a purse, asking "anyone named Mary – or anyone who knew someone named Mary" – to donate a dime. It was the most common name at the time, and the donations supported the first "Mary free bed" at a local hospital. The Mary Free Bed Guild, incorporated in 1911, was inducted into the Michigan Women's Hall of Fame in 2016.

== Rehabilitation services ==
Sports
The hospital's Wheelchair & Adaptive Sports Program sponsors junior and adult teams, including the Grand Rapids Pacers wheelchair basketball team, Mary Free Bed Sonics goalball team, Grand Rapids Rollin' Whitecaps wheelchair softball team, Grand Rapids Sled Wings sled hockey team, Grand Rapids Thunder quad rugby team, and tennis teams. Mary Free Bed supports handcycle and wheelchair racing teams and sponsors the 25K wheelchair and handcycle divisions of the Fifth Third River Bank Run held annually in downtown Grand Rapids. The program also hosts adaptive clinics for recreational activities like yoga, archery, rock climbing, golfing, sailing, kayaking, water-skiing, scuba diving, and snow-skiing.

Accreditation
Mary Free Bed Rehabilitation Hospital is accredited by the Joint Commission on Accreditation of Healthcare Organizations. Programs accredited by the international Commission on Accreditation of Rehabilitation Facilities include brain injury, spinal cord injury, stroke, amputation, and pediatrics.

The Mary Free Bed Rehabilitation Network
The Mary Free Bed Rehabilitation Network was launched in June 2011 to provide better access to Mary Free Bed doctors, staff, and education. This group of healthcare organizations works together to provide coordinated, collaborative care after a serious injury or illness.

Members include Allegiance Health, Beacon Kalamazoo Hospital, Bronson Battle Creek, Bronson LakeView, Bronson Methodist, Covenant HealthCare, McLaren Health System, University of Michigan Health-West Metro Hospital, Vandalia Health, Valley Health and Sparrow Hospital.

Mary Free Bed at Covenant (located in Saginaw, MI) is the largest inpatient rehab unit in northern Michigan and is CARF accredited.
