= Riverside Osteopathic Hospital =

Geography
- Location: Trenton, Michigan, United States
- Coordinates: 42.149°N 83.175°W

Organization
- Type: Osteopathic
- Affiliated university: Henry Ford Health System

Services
- Emergency department: Yes
- Beds: 162

History
- Founded: 1944
- Closed: 2002
- Demolished: 2023 (In progress)

Links
- Lists: Hospitals in Michigan

Riverside Osteopathic Hospital was an osteopathic hospital located in Trenton, Michigan. The hospital was closed in 2002. As of August 2023, the building is currently being demolished.

== History ==
In the late-1800s, a riverside mansion was built by businessman Austin Church (one-time owner of the Sibley Quarry and Arm and Hammer) for use by his wife. In 1943, the Church family donated the property so that it could be converted into a hospital. More modern additions took place in years following, surrounding the original mansion.

== Downfall and Demolition ==
Between 1998 and 2002, Riverside Osteopathic lost $21 million. In 2002, a merger with Oakwood Southshore Medical Center failed. In July, the hospital was merged with Henry Ford Wyandotte (MI) Hospital. It was supposed be converted to an ambulatory and emergency-care center, but 100 physicians left to a competitor.

In October 2002, Henry Ford Health System announced plans to close the hospital. It shut down on November 15, 2002. The building was set to be demolished in 2013, but still remains as of 2020.

In December 2021, it was announced that the City of Trenton had reached an agreement with the owner of the building, Dr. Iqbal Nasir and NABA Management, to demolish the property after almost 20 years of abandonment.
