= Helen Newberry Joy Hospital =

Geography
- Location: Newberry, Michigan, United States
- Coordinates: 46.35307°N 85.51558°W

History
- Founded: 1965

Links
- Website: hnjh.org
- Lists: Hospitals in Michigan

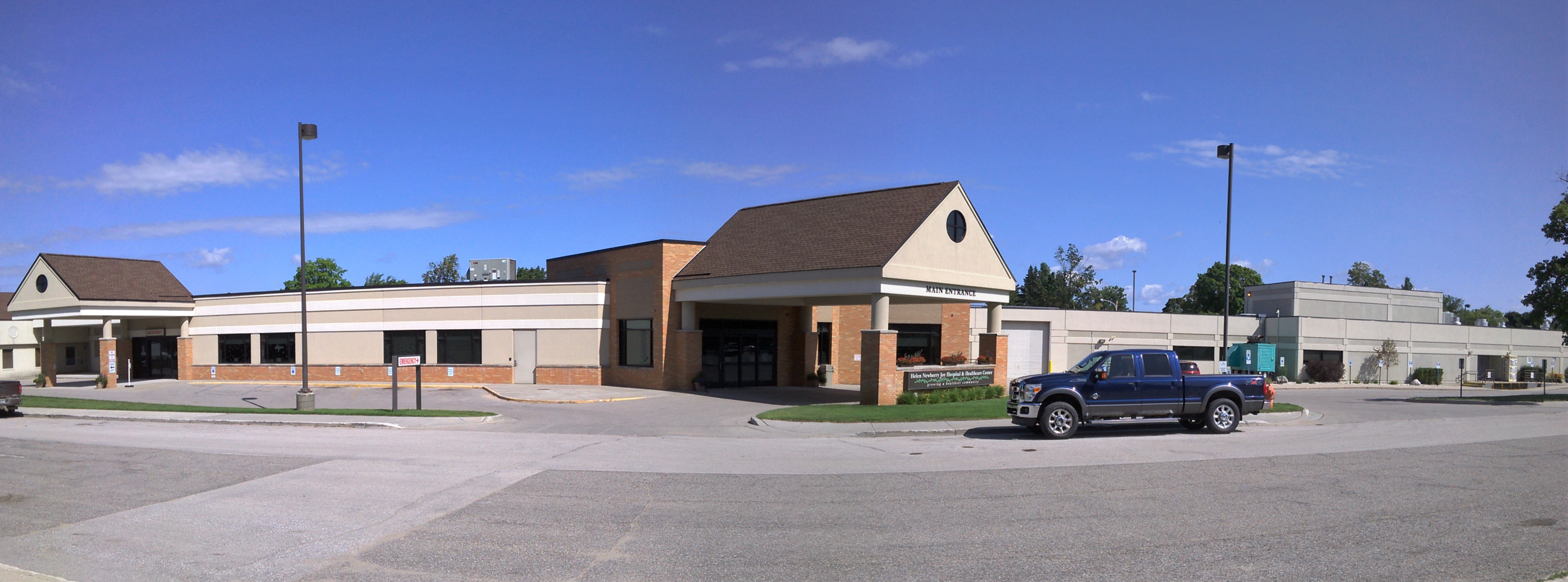
Helen Newberry Joy Hospital

Helen Newberry Joy Hospital & Healthcare Center is a rural health care facility. Established in 1965, the hospital is located in the Village of Newberry in the eastern Upper Peninsula of Michigan.

As a rural hospital, HNJH operates a 25-bed acute care hospital, a same-day clinic, as well as three outlying community clinics in Curtis, Engadine and Manistique. It also offers a full-time Emergency Department, out-patient Surgical Services, and Telehealth (in conjunction with the UP Telehealth Network). The hospital also provides complete Laboratory and Diagnostic Imaging services; rehabilitation services, including Physical and Occupational Therapy, Speech/Language Pathology, Cardiac Rehab, Health and Wellness Center, and Cardio-Pulmonary Rehab. A Coumadin Clinic is available on-site, as is an AASM accredited Sleep Center and an out-patient Chemo and Infusion Therapy department. Attached to HNJH is the Golden Leaves Living Center, a 48-bed long-term care department.

Helen Newberry Joy Hospital is a Critical Access Hospital and a member of the Michigan Health & Hospital Association.

== Accreditations and awards ==
- Michigan Governors Award of Excellence, 2004-2006
- JCAHO Accreditation
