= Brighton Hospital =

Brighton Center For Recovery
- Location within Michigan

Geography
- Location: Brighton, Michigan, United States
- Coordinates: 42.5197°N 83.6959°W

Organization
- Type: Specialist

Services
- Speciality: Drug and alcohol addiction

History
- Founded: 1948

Links
- Website: www.brightonhospital.org
- Lists: Hospitals in the United States

Brighton Hospital is one of the oldest alcoholism and addiction treatment centers in North America.

== Location and construction ==
It is located on 92 acres (37 ha) in Brighton, Michigan. Brighton's predecessor institution, the Bloomfield Hills Sanitarium, was established in 1943, with the current hospital campus acquired in 1950. The hospital's Ludington Peace Center Chapel was a gift of the Ford Motor Company, having been originally constructed by Henry Ford for Camp Legion, and then moved to the Brighton campus after his death. Brighton added an outpatient campus in 2008 called "Brighton at the Corners" in West Bloomfield Michigan, now closed.

== Services ==
Bill Wilson, co-founder of Alcoholics Anonymous, assisted the hospital's founding President, Harry Henderson, in establishing Brighton Hospital as Michigan's first treatment center for alcoholism and addiction. Marty Mann, of the National Council of Alcoholism, was also involved in the early development of the hospital. Since its founding, Brighton uses 30-day inpatient treatment programs, including Detoxification (detox), Rehabilitation (drug rehab) and Domiciliary Partial Hospitalization. Brighton accepts patients who pay privately as well as those who have insurance coverage.

== Staffing ==
Brighton Hospital offers Masters-prepared therapists. Several of the physicians are Fellows of the American Society of Addiction Medicine (ASAM).

== Accreditation and affiliations ==
Brighton Hospital is a member of St. John's Providence Health System, Michigan, a unit of Ascension Health, America's largest faith-based health system.
