= Dickinson County Healthcare System =

Coordinates: 45°48′35.6″N 88°02′40.5″W

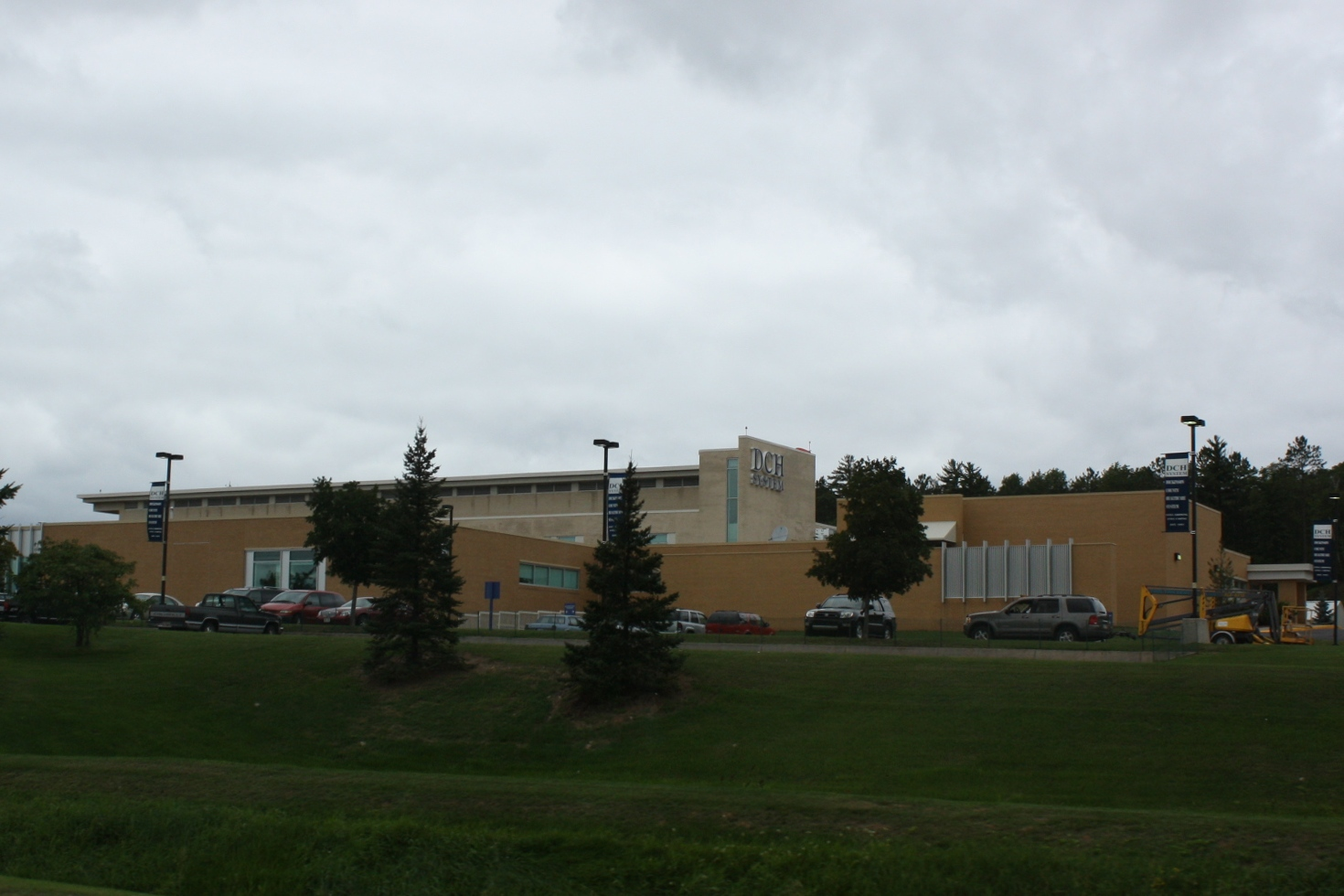

Geography
- Location: Iron Mountain, Michigan, United States

Organization
- Care system: Public
- Type: Community

Services
- Beds: 49

Links
- Website: http://www.dchs.org/
- Lists: Hospitals in Michigan

The Dickinson County Healthcare System is a hospital located in Iron Mountain, Michigan.

== Images ==
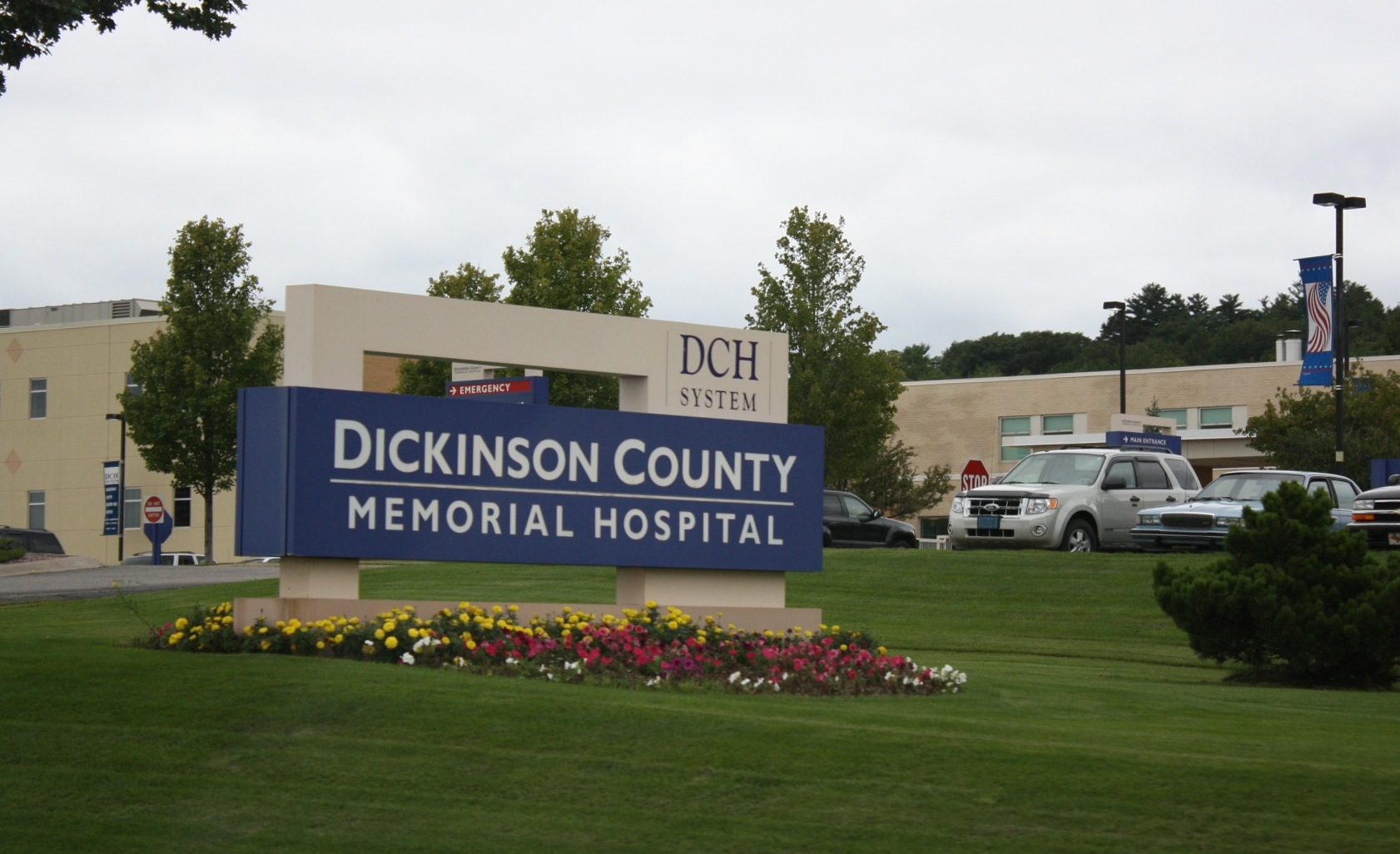
Sign

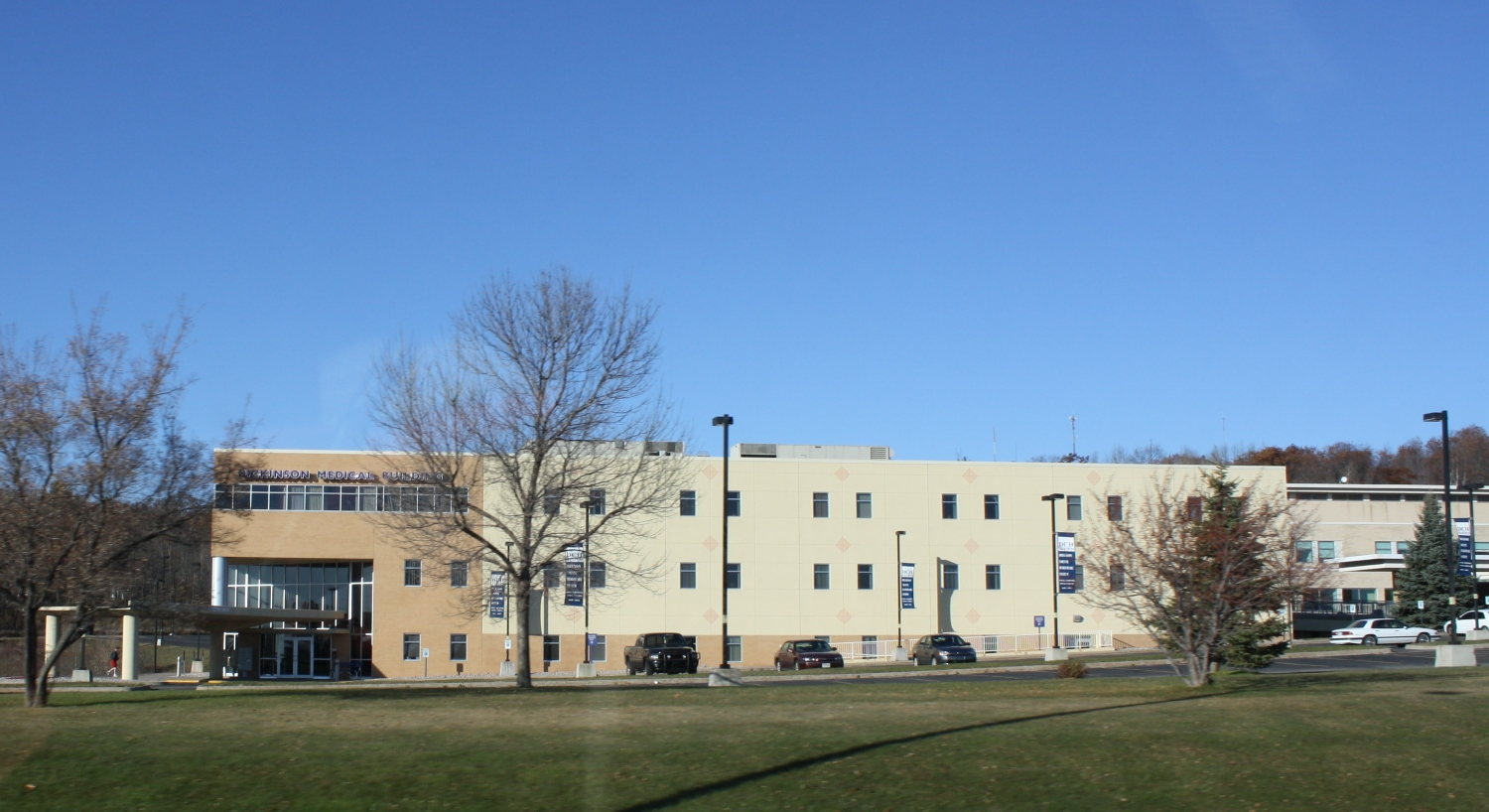
Side view
