= Bronson Methodist Hospital =

- Bronson Healthcare Group

Geography
- Location: Kalamazoo, Michigan, United States
- Coordinates: 42.28467°N 85.58038°W

Organization
- Funding: Non-profit hospital
- Type: Teaching
- Affiliated university: Michigan State University; Western Michigan University

Services
- Emergency department: Level I trauma center
- Beds: 435
- Helipad: Yes

History
- Opened: 1900

Links
- Website: www.bronsonhealth.com/bronson
- Lists: Hospitals in Michigan

Bronson Methodist Hospital is a 434-bed non-profit teaching hospital located in downtown Kalamazoo, Michigan, United States, and is a Level I trauma center. Bronson Methodist Hospital is the flagship of the Bronson Healthcare Group, a non-profit healthcare system serving all of southwest Michigan and northern Indiana. Bronson Methodist Hospital provides care in cardiology, orthopedics, surgery, emergency medicine, neurology, oncology; in neurological care as a Comprehensive Stroke Center; in cardiac care as a Chest Pain Center; in obstetrics as a BirthPlace and high-risk pregnancy center, and in pediatrics as a children's hospital.

The hospital is located on a 28-acre (11 ha) urban campus, which includes a heliport.

== History ==
This hospital first opened in 1900 as "Kalamazoo Hospital". After a new building was built for the hospital in 1905, the hospital was renamed "Bronson Hospital" in 1907 after the founder of Kalamazoo, Titus Bronson. After several years of financial difficulties, in 1920 the hospital was acquired by the Michigan Conference of the Methodist Episcopal Church. The hospital was then renamed "Bronson Methodist Hospital".

In 1951, an expansion project was completed, which included the addition of 121 new beds, a new emergency clinic, pharmacy, laboratories, and x-ray rooms. In 1956, the hospital opened a heart catheterization clinic.

Bronson Methodist Hospital established ties with local colleges, training medical students from the University of Michigan Medical School from 1947 and sending its nursing students to attend classes at Western Michigan University. WMU's nursing school bears the name Bronson School of Nursing in honor of this relationship.

This hospital was featured in the Reading Rainbow episode "Mummies Made in Egypt" on PBS in 1989.

== Bronson Healthcare Group ==
With more than 8,000 employees, the Bronson Healthcare Group is one of Kalamazoo's largest employers. In 2007, Bronson provided more than $83.1 million in community benefits through outreach and charitable care for the uninsured and under-insured. Bronson also serves the largest percentage of Medicaid patients of any hospital outside of the Detroit area.

== Bronson Neuroscience Center ==
Bronson Neuroscience Center is part of the Bronson system. Patients come to the Neuroscience Center for the treatment of head injury, stroke, epilepsy, nerve damage, problems with memory or involuntary movement, and spine and back surgery. Located in Kalamazoo, Michigan, USA, Bronson Neuroscience Center has assembled a team of more than 20 specialists. The Center serves all of southwest Michigan, and focuses on providing patient and family centered care. Along with an inpatient Neurovascular Unit, Bronson Neuroscience Center also includes an Epilepsy Monitoring Unit, a 24-hour Acute Stroke Intervention Team and a Rapid Response Team on-site. A laboratory provides diagnostic equipment and techniques for the investigation of neurological problems.

=== Specialties ===
The following list constitutes the categories of services that Bronson Neuroscience Center provides for both adults and children with neurological disorders:

Neurology – offers the diagnosis and treatment of conditions such as brain tumor, stroke, epilepsy, problems with memory or involuntary movement and migraine, as well as nerve damage and head injury.

Neurosurgery – offers comprehensive non-surgical and surgical treatments for brain tumors, vascular disorders, and spine and nerve problems. Some of our surgical approaches include minimally invasive surgery, routine to complex procedures and traditional open procedures.

Neurointerventional Radiology – offers noninvasive treatment for the most complex strokes and aneurysms using high-tech imaging equipment.

Spine Services – offers services for the full scope of spinal diseases, disorders and injuries, including the diagnosis and treatment of lower back pain and more complex problems such as spine fractures. Collaboration among a physiatrist (a doctor that specializes in physical rehabilitation), neurosurgeons, orthopedic surgeons, neuroradiologists and physical therapists is the basis for a thorough assessment and treatment plan.

Neurodiagnostics – offers a laboratory providing diagnostic equipment and techniques for the investigation of neurological problems. Choosing the right tests is important to achieving good results. The neurodiagnostic laboratory has various studies that can be used either individually or in combination with other tests to help solve neurological problems of the brain, spinal cord, muscle, nerves, and blood flow.

Behavioral health – offers the diagnosis and treatment of behavioral disorders such as anxiety, depression and emotional and behavioral problems associated with forms of dementia such as Alzheimer's disease.
