= Aspirus Health =

Nonprofit health system serving Wisconsin, Michigan and Minnesota

Aspirus, Inc.
- Industry: Health care
- Headquarters: Wausau, Wisconsin
- Website: www.aspirus.org

Aspirus Health is a non-profit health system headquartered in Wausau, Wisconsin. The system includes 19 hospitals and serves portions of Wisconsin, Minnesota and the western Upper Peninsula of Michigan. It was previously known as Community Health Care.

Aspirus and Saint Luke's Duluth became a combined organization in March 2024. As a result, Saint Luke's hospital in Duluth, Minnesota and Lake View Hospital in Two Harbors, Minnesota became affiliated with Aspirus. In February 2024, Aspirus announced that their Ontonagon, Michigan hospital would close in April and a $30 million investment would be made in the Aspirus Keweenaw Hospital in Laurium, Michigan.

In 2019, a patient died due to St. Luke's hospital's failure to diagnose and treat blastomycosis in time. In 2025, jury awarded the patient's family $16.5 million in wrongful death case, making it one of the largest malpractice award in Minnesota history.

== Hospitals ==
- Aspirus Divine Savior Hospital in Portage, Wisconsin
- Aspirus Eagle River Hospital in Eagle River, Wisconsin
- Aspirus Iron River Hospital in Iron River, Michigan
- Aspirus Ironwood Hospital in Ironwood, Michigan
- Aspirus Keweenaw Hospital in Laurium, Michigan
- Aspirus Langlade Hospital in Antigo, Wisconsin
- Aspirus Medford Hospital in Medford, Wisconsin
- Aspirus Merrill Hospital in Merrill, Wisconsin
- Aspirus Plover Hospital in Stevens Point, Wisconsin
- Aspirus Rhinelander Hospital in Rhinelander, Wisconsin
- Aspirus Riverview Hospital in Wisconsin Rapids, Wisconsin
- Aspirus Stanley Hospital in Stanley, Wisconsin
- Aspirus Stevens Point Hospital in Stevens Point, Wisconsin
- Aspirus Tomahawk Hospital in Tomahawk, Wisconsin
- Aspirus Wausau Hospital in Wausau, Wisconsin
- Howard Young Medical Center in Woodruff, Wisconsin
- Lake View Hospital in Two Harbors, Minnesota
- St. Luke's Hospital in Duluth, Minnesota
