= University of Michigan Health - Sparrow =

Coordinates: 42.734207°N 84.535122°W

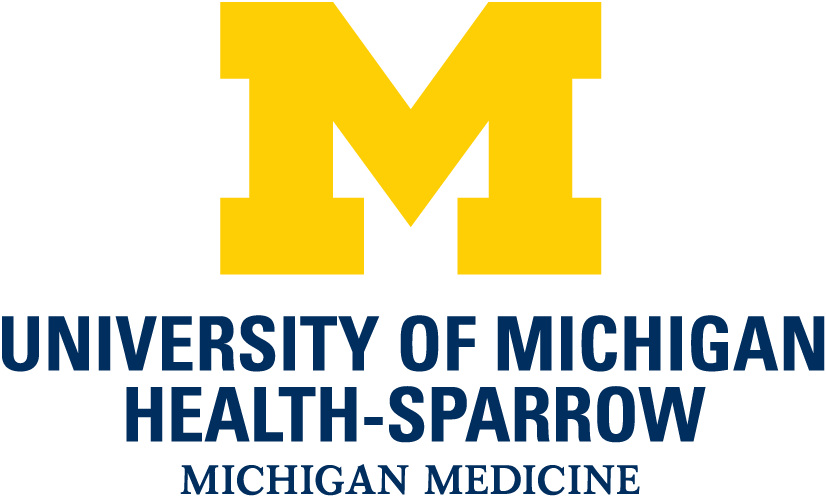
- Company type: For profit (hospitals are non profit divisions)
- Industry: Healthcare
- Founded: 1912
- Founder: Edward W. Sparrow
- Headquarters: Lansing, Michigan, USA
- Area served: Central Michigan
- Revenue: ▲$1.14 billion USD (2014)
- Net income: ▲$12.8 million USD (2014)
- Number of employees: 7,600 total (2013)
- Website: https://www.uofmhealthsparrow.org/

University of Michigan Health - Sparrow is a comprehensive, integrated health care organization located in Central Michigan. More than 900 physicians are affiliated with University of Michigan Health - Sparrow.

Two for profit financing organizations, the Physicians Health Plan and the Sparrow Physicians Health Plan, are owned and operated by University of Michigan Health - Sparrow. Hospitals within the University of Michigan Health - Sparrow system include University of Michigan Health - Sparrow Lansing and University of Michigan Health - Sparrow Specialty Hospital (Long Term Acute Care formerly located at the old St. Lawrence Hospital) in Lansing, University of Michigan Health - Sparrow Clinton, University of Michigan Health - Sparrow Carson, University of Michigan Health - Sparrow Eaton, and University of Michigan Health - Sparrow Ionia. The Michigan Athletic Club, located in Lansing, is also a subsidiary of University of Michigan Health - Sparrow. The University of Michigan Health - Sparrow Laboratory performs over 3 million tests per year, at various laboratory sites, which include four remote testing facilities and thirteen patient service centers.

A portion of University of Michigan Health - Sparrow employees are represented by the Michigan Nurses Association and the UAW Local 4911.

In April 2023, Michigan Medicine merged with Sparrow Health System. In April 2024, Sparrow Health System was renamed University of Michigan Health–Sparrow.
