= Holland Hospital =

Hospital in Michigan, United States

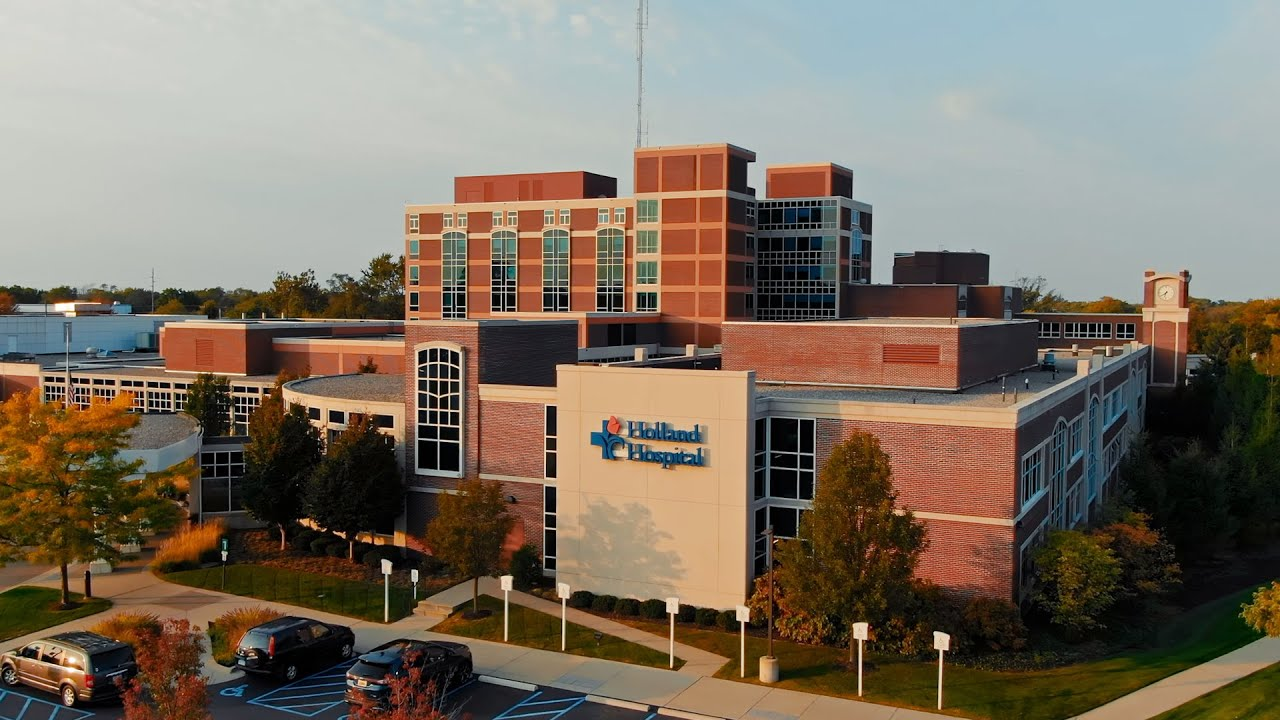

- Location within Michigan

Geography
- Location: Holland, West Michigan, Michigan, United States
- Coordinates: 42.7743667°N 86.1139841°W

Organization
- Care system: Private
- Type: Community

Services
- Standards: ISO 9001:2008
- Emergency department: Level III
- Beds: 191

History
- Founded: 1917

Links
- Website: www.hollandhospital.org
- Lists: Hospitals in Michigan

Holland Hospital is a non-profit hospital headquartered in Holland, Michigan. Holland Hospital includes 191-bed supported by additional satellite facilities in the surrounding communities throughout Ottawa and Allegan counties along the West Michigan lakeshore.

== Overview ==
Holland Hospital was founded in 1917 in the home of a local doctor named Dr. Henry Kremers. The hospital provides care through its main campus and a network of clinics and partner organizations, including the Holland Hospital Medical Group, the Bone & Joint Center, Western Michigan Urological Associates, and the Holland Physician Hospital Organization.

== Awards ==
Since the Centers for Medicare & Medicaid Services (CMS) introduced its star rating system in 2016, Holland Hospital has consistently received a 5-star rating, making it the only hospital in West Michigan to earn this designation every year since the program’s inception. Organizations like Healthgrades have routinely ranked Holland Hospital as a leader in Michigan and nationwide for delivering outstanding patient experiences and excellence in surgical and joint replacement services, and more.

== Facilities and Services ==
The hospital’s main campus includes inpatient units, surgical suites, diagnostic imaging, the Boven Birth Center, emergency services, cardiology and vascular services, and more. Additional locations across the West Michigan lakeshore provide primary care, walk-in care, urgent care, physical therapy, imaging, lab, and specialty services. Holland Hospital’s medical group includes both primary and specialty care practices.

== Community Roles ==
Holland Hospital participates in community health initiatives, patient education programs, scholarships, and partnerships aimed at improving regional health outcomes.

== Scholarships ==
The Holland Hospital Auxiliary awards annual scholarships for college students pursuing a degree in health care. Scholarships are available to college juniors and seniors with permanent residence in the greater Holland and Zeeland area. Holland Hospital offers scholarship programs including Holland Hospital RN Scholarship Program and Volunteer Council Health Care Scholarship. In addition to scholarship opportunities Holland Hospital also offers clinical rotations, job shadowing, internships, and externships.

== See also ==
- List of hospitals in Michigan
