= Ascension Michigan =

Former hospital system in Michigan

Coordinates: 42°29′51.9″N 83°05′03.1″W

Ascension Michigan (formerly St. John Providence Health System) was a non-profit Catholic health system in Michigan, United States. It was a division of Ascension Health, having previously operated in mid-Michigan and Metro Detroit. Prior to its acquisition by Ascension, it was headquartered in Warren, Michigan.

== History ==
=== Predecessor systems ===
In 1910 the Providence Hospital opened in Detroit. The Sisters of St. Joseph built St. John Hospital in 1952, with 250 beds and 70 employees on Moross Road at the old Beaupre farm in a section called the “widow’s dower.” Work on the hospital began immediately following the groundbreaking ceremony on March 8, 1948, the feast of St. John of God (who in 1540 established a house to harbor poor and sick persons). Four-and-a-half year old Brenda Kay Earle was the hospital's first patient on May 15, 1952. Also in that year, Randall John Stewart was the first baby born there. In 2006, there were 4,900 employees and a 700-member medical staff. The hospital's Emergency Room treated 8,287 patients during 1956, its first year. Fr. Solanus Casey, the first United States-born man to be declared "venerable" by the Roman Catholic Church, died on July 31, 1957, in St. John Hospital (in Room 305 of the old wing, which has a plaque outside the door) at the age of 86.

In the 1960s Providence Hospital moved to Southfield.

The Men's Guild began in 1948 and is believed to have been the first men's hospital fund raising group in the United States. It has 750 members that support its philanthropic efforts, highlighted by the Annual Guild Dinner.

=== St. John Providence ===
The system started in 1999 with the merger of the Providence Health System and the St. John Health System into the St. John Health System due to the merger of the two systems' respective Roman Catholic congregation sponsors, the Daughters of Charity and the Sisters of St. Joseph, into Ascension Health. The St. John Hospital System, under Anthony R. Tersigni, grew from four to ten hospitals. In May 2000 he was appointed as the senior vice president of Ascension Health's Great Lakes Division.

By 2001, the emergency center staff was treating more than 76,400 patients as a major level-two emergency center for the east side community.

In 2003 the hospital stated that it expected to have a $40 million loss for its 2004 fiscal year. In 2003 the system supported a proposed Michigan law that would allow the state health systems to move more hospital beds from Detroit to the suburbs.

In 2008 the system had 18,000 employees. On April 8 of that year Patricia A. Maryland, the system CEO, announced that as part of an $85 million cost cutting restructuring, the company planned to lay off 300 non-clinical workers with almost 50 management positions being cut. She also announced that the system would not fill 100 job vacancies, including 40 vacancies for management positions.

In 2010 St. John Health System was renamed to the St. John Providence Health System. The organization officials stated that "Providence" was added to the name in order to reflect the system's "spiritually centered patient care experience". The system was acquired by Ascension in 2018, and adopted the name Ascension Michigan. Accordingly, the names of the hospitals changed to their current names.

=== Divestiture of Metro Detroit and Mid-Michigan operations ===
In August 2024, Ascension sold three hospitals in Saginaw, Standish, and Tawas City to MyMichigan Health. Later, in September 2024, the system's Metro Detroit and Greater Flint operations were transferred to Henry Ford Health, as a result of a joint venture between the organizations.

== Hospitals ==
Ascension Michigan formerly operated the following hospitals, only one hospital is still using the name Ascension:

- Ascension Borgess Hospital (Kalamazoo)

=== Former ===
- Ascension St. John Hospital, Detroit (formerly St. John Hospital & Medical Center) - transferred to Henry Ford Health in 2024
- Ascension Macomb-Oakland Hospital, Warren and Madison Heights (formerly St. John Macomb-Oakland Hospital) - transferred to Henry Ford Health in 2024
  - St. John Macomb Hospital and St. John Oakland Hospital merged in 2007.
- Ascension Providence Hospital, Southfield (formerly Providence-Providence Park Hospital) - transferred to Henry Ford Health in 2024
- Ascension Providence Hospital, Novi (formerly St. John Providence Park Hospital) - transferred to Henry Ford Health in 2024
- Ascension Providence Rochester Hospital, Rochester Hills (formerly Crittenton Hospital Medical Center) - transferred to Henry Ford Health in 2024
- Ascension River District Hospital, East China Township (formerly St. John River District Hospital) - transferred to Henry Ford Health in 2024
- Ascension Brighton Center for Recovery (formerly Brighton Center for Recovery) (Brighton Township) - transferred to Henry Ford Health in 2024
- Ascension Genesys Hospital (formerly Genesys Regional Medical Center) (Grand Blanc Township) - transferred to Henry Ford Health in 2024
- Ascension St. Mary's Hospital (formerly St. Mary's of Michigan Medical Center) - Saginaw - sold to MyMichigan Health in 2024
- Ascension Standish Hospital (formerly St. Mary's of Michigan Standish Hospital) - Standish - sold to MyMichigan Health in 2024
- Ascension St. Joseph Hospital (formerly St. Joseph Health System) - Tawas -sold to MyMichigan Health in 2024

St. John previously operated the St. John NorthEast Community Hospital in Detroit. It had 295 beds. By 2003 the health system stated that it will remake the hospital into an outpatient center. In 2003 The Holy Cross Foundation made an initial offer to buy the hospital. The St. John System rejected the initial offer and stated that it still planned to remake the hospital, but the Holy Cross Foundation planned to make another offer.

In 2007 the St. John Riverview Hospital in Detroit closed. In 2011 the system sold the St. John Senior Community Center and the closed Riverview Hospital, both in Detroit, to DRSN, an investment group.
