= McLaren Health Care Corporation =

American healthcare organization

- Company type: Nonprofit
- Industry: Healthcare
- Founded: 1914
- Headquarters: Grand Blanc, Michigan, USA
- Area served: Flint/Tri-Cities, Central Michigan, Southeast Michigan
- Key people: Philip A. Incarnati, President/CEO; Daniel Boge, Chairman
- Revenue: $7.3 billion USD (2021)
- Website: http://www.mclaren.org/

McLaren Health Care Corporation, is headquartered in Grand Blanc, Michigan, includes 12 hospitals in Michigan, ambulatory surgery centers, imaging centers, a 490-member employed primary and specialty care physician network, commercial and Medicaid HMOs covering more than 732,838 lives in Michigan and Indiana, home health, infusion and hospice providers, pharmacy services, a clinical laboratory network and a wholly owned medical malpractice insurance company. McLaren operates Michigan’s largest network of cancer centers and providers, anchored by the Karmanos Cancer Institute, one of only 57 National Cancer Institute-designated comprehensive cancer centers in the U.S. McLaren has 28,000 full-time, part-time and contracted employees and more than 113,000 network providers throughout Michigan and Indiana. They used to operate in Ohio, but ended up shutting down St. Luke’s Hospital, and selling both the hospital, along with WellCare Physicians Group, to Bon Secours Mercy Health.

As part of its Graduate Medical Education (GME) program, McLaren maintains academic affiliations with medical schools at Wayne State University, Michigan State University and Central Michigan University. McLaren’s six GME campuses offer 27 residencies and eight fellowship programs that train over 650 future physicians annually. All GME programs at McLaren are overseen and managed centrally by the Department of Academic Affairs.

McLaren is the presenting sponsor of the Ally Challenge, an annual golf tournament held every year at Warwick Hills Country Club.

== Hospitals ==
Hospital	Location	Bed count	Emergency Department	Founded	Notes
McLaren Flint	Flint, Michigan	378	Yes	1919	Formerly known as McLaren Regional Medical Center
McLaren Lapeer Region	Lapeer, Michigan	222	Yes	1944	Formerly known as Lapeer Community Medical Center
McLaren Greater Lansing	Lansing, Michigan	389	Yes	1913	Formerly known as Ingham Regional Medical Center
McLaren Bay Region	Bay City, Michigan	389	Yes	1908	Formerly Bay Regional Medical Center
McLaren Macomb	Mt. Clemens, Michigan	288	Yes	1944	Formerly Mount Clemens Regional Medical Center
McLaren Oakland	Pontiac, Michigan	328	Yes	1953	Formerly Pontiac Osteopathic Hospital (POH)
McLaren Central Michigan	Mt. Pleasant, Michigan	118	Yes	1943	Formerly Central Michigan Community Hospital (CMCH)
McLaren Northern Michigan	Petoskey, Michigan	202	Yes		Formerly Northern Michigan Regional Hospital (NMRH)
McLaren Port Huron	Port Huron, Michigan	186	Yes	1882	Formerly Port Huron Hospital
McLaren Caro Region	Caro, Michigan	25	Yes	1928	Formerly Caro Community Hospital
McLaren Thumb Region	Bad Axe, Michigan	58	Yes	1906	Formerly Huron Medical Center
