= Lemmen-Holton Cancer Pavilion =

Outpatient cancer center in Michigan, US

- Corewell Health

Geography
- Location: 145 Michigan St NE, Grand Rapids, Michigan, United States
- Coordinates: 42.971°N 85.665°W

Organization
- Type: Outpatient cancer center

History
- Founded: 2008

Links
- Website: https://findadoctor.spectrumhealth.org/location/profile/7989
- Lists: Hospitals in Michigan

The Lemmen-Holton Cancer Pavilion is an outpatient cancer center located in the Grand Rapids Medical Mile in downtown Grand Rapids, Michigan. It was developed to bring all cancer research and patient service delivery under one roof in the Spectrum Health System, which merged with Beaumont Health in 2022 to form Corewell Health. The land for the project was purchased in 2002 with a donation from Frederik and Lena Meijer. The $78 million facility, with some 284,000 square feet (26,400 m^{2}) over six floors, opened on June 30, 2008. The Pavilion is named after two employees that worked for Meijer and advanced their way to the top of the company.

It is located across the street from Butterworth Hospital on Michigan Street and is connected to it by a tunnel. Since the location is also near the Van Andel Institute, the hospital has a high rate of cancer patients on clinical trials: eight percent compared to the national rate of three percent. It contains the only adult blood and marrow transplant department in West Michigan.

During the COVID-19 pandemic, the center offered drive-up options for some cancer treatements, although chemotherapy was still carried out inside the clinic.
