= Grand Rapids Medical Corridor North Pedestrian Tunnel =

Coordinates: 42°58′13.8″N 85°39′55.4″W

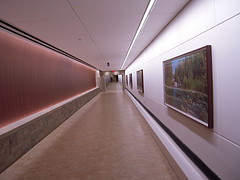
- pedestrian tunnel under Michigan Street
- Interactive map of Grand Rapids Medical Corridor North Pedestrian Tunnel

Overview
- Location: Grand Rapids, Michigan
- Status: open
- Start: Butterworth Hospital
- End: Lemmen-Holton Cancer Pavilion

Operation
- Work began: 15 December 2005
- Constructed: excavated through grouted glacial till, shotcrete lined
- Opened: 26 May 2006
- Owner: Corewell Health
- Character: pedestrian tunnel

Technical
- Length: 130 feet (40 meters)
- Tunnel clearance: 20 ft (6.1 m)
- Grade: level

The Grand Rapids Medical Corridor North Pedestrian Tunnel is a tunnel in Grand Rapids, Michigan connecting the Lemmen-Holton Cancer Pavilion with Butterworth Hospital and Helen DeVos Children's Hospital.

== Construction ==
The tunnel passes under Michigan Street, a busy thoroughfare in the Grand Rapids Medical Mile. Construction was accomplished using the New Austrian tunneling method without disrupting the traffic moving on the street above. The tunnel was mined through glacial till, which was grouted with sodium silicate to stabilize it prior to digging the tunnel. The tunnel is lined with 15 inches (380 mm) of shotcrete.

In 2007, it received the ABC/WMC Construction Award from the Associated Builders and Contractors–Western Michigan Chapter.
