= Spectrum Health Lakeland =

Nonprofit community-owned health system in southwest Michigan

Coordinates: 42°05′19.9″N 86°28′42.1″W

- Type: Non-profit hospital
- Industry: Healthcare
- Year Founded: 1899
- Service Area: Southwest Michigan
- Number of Employees: 3934
- Hospital Type: Teaching
- Affiliated University: Michigan State University College of Osteopathic Medicine

Spectrum Health Lakeland was a nonprofit community-owned health system in southwest Michigan. The health system comprised three hospitals, an outpatient surgery center, a regional cancer center, rehabilitation centers, two long-term care residences, home care and hospice services, and 34 affiliate physician practice locations. Following the Beaumont Health and Spectrum Health merger in 2022, Corewell Health was created and Spectrum Health Lakeland was merged into it.

== History ==
For over a century, Spectrum Health Lakeland served the community of southwest Michigan. Since its inception, the health system experienced mergers, consolidations, and growth.

- 1899 - Mercy Hospital opens in Benton Harbor (building demolished beginning November 7, 2016)
- 1951 - Memorial Hospital opens in St. Joseph
- 1977 - Memorial Hospital (St. Joseph) and Mercy Hospital (Benton Harbor) merge to form Mercy Memorial Hospital
- 1992 - Pawating Hospital (Niles) merges with Mercy Memorial Hospital, forming Lakeland Regional Health System; Pawating Hospital becomes Lakeland Hospital, Niles
- 1994 - Berrien General Hospital merges with Lakeland
- 2002 - Center for Outpatient Services opens in Royalton Township, St. Joseph
- 2009 - Inpatient addition opens at Lakeland Regional Medical Center, St. Joseph
- 2010 - Southwestern Medical Clinic becomes a Lakeland HealthCare Affiliate; Community Hospital of Watervliet merges with Lakeland
- 2011 - The Marie Yeager Cancer Center in Royalton Township opens; Hospice at Home becomes a Lakeland HealthCare Affiliate
- 2012 - Lakeland Medical Suites, Niles opens to the public
- 2013 - The new and expanded Emergency Department opens at Lakeland Hospital, Niles; Hanson Hospice Center opens to the public; Pine Ridge Nursing and Rehabilitation opens to the public
- 2015 - Lakeland HealthCare announces corporate name change to Lakeland Health
- 2015 - Lakeland Health joins Mary Free Bed Rehabilitation Network
- 2015 - Six Michigan health systems align to form integrated care network
- 2016 - Lakeland Board of Directors approve five-story, $160 million expansion to St. Joseph campus
- 2018 - Lakeland Health and Spectrum Health merge, with Lakeland Health becoming Spectrum Health Lakeland
- 2022 - Spectrum Health and Beaumont Health merge to create Corewell Health, with Spectrum Health Lakeland becoming a part of Corewell Health

== Services ==
Spectrum Health Lakeland provides both inpatient and outpatient medical services throughout southwest Michigan. Lakeland Hospital, Niles and Lakeland Medical Center, St. Joseph are two of 14 hospitals in Michigan accredited by the Society of Chest Pain Centers. The Joint Commission, in conjunction with The American Heart Association/American Stroke Association, has recognized Lakeland Medical Center, St. Joseph and Lakeland Hospital, Niles with Advanced Certification for Primary Stroke Centers.

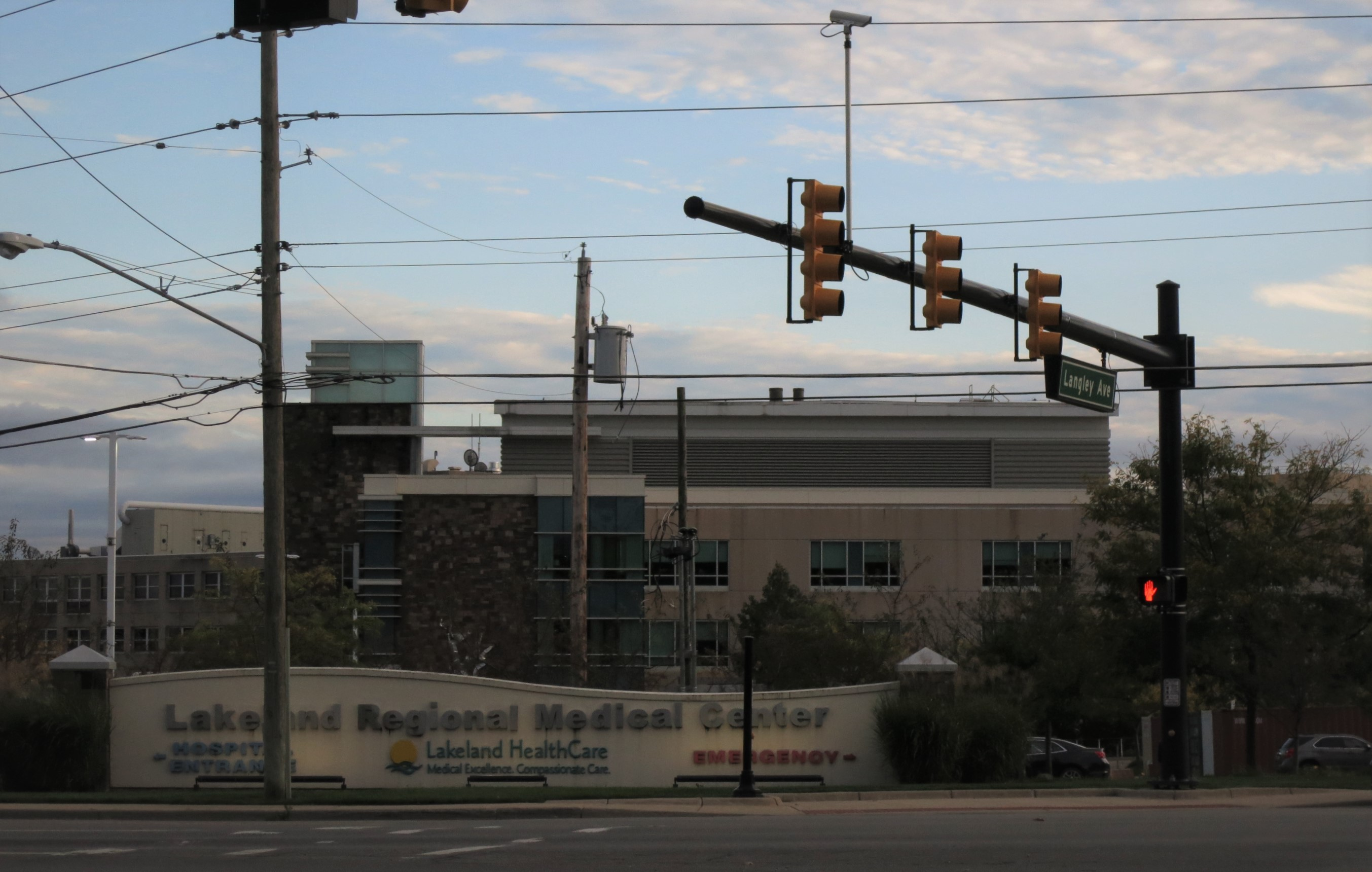
St. Joseph main facility in c. 2019

=== Campuses ===
- Lakeland Medical Center, St. Joseph
- Lakeland Hospital, Niles
- Lakeland Hospital, Watervliet
- The Lakeland Health Park, St. Joseph
- The Hanson Care Park

== Awards ==
- 2014 Advisory Board Engagement Award
- 2014 HIMSS Enterprise Davies Award recipient
- 2014 Governor's Fitness Award Outstanding Healthy Workplace Diamond Level Winner
- 2014 Governor's Award of Excellence for outstanding inpatient clinical achievement in the acute care hospital setting
- 2015 "100 Great Community Hospitals" by Becker's Hospital Review
- 2015 Most Wired List
- 2015 Patient Centric Imaging Award
- Healthgrades Patient Safety Excellence Award
- Stage 7 by HIMSS Analytics
- U.S. News & World Report 2016 Best Hospitals List
- 2017 15 Top Health System by Truven Health Analytics
