= Crescent Park (Grand Rapids, Michigan) =

Park in Michigan, United States

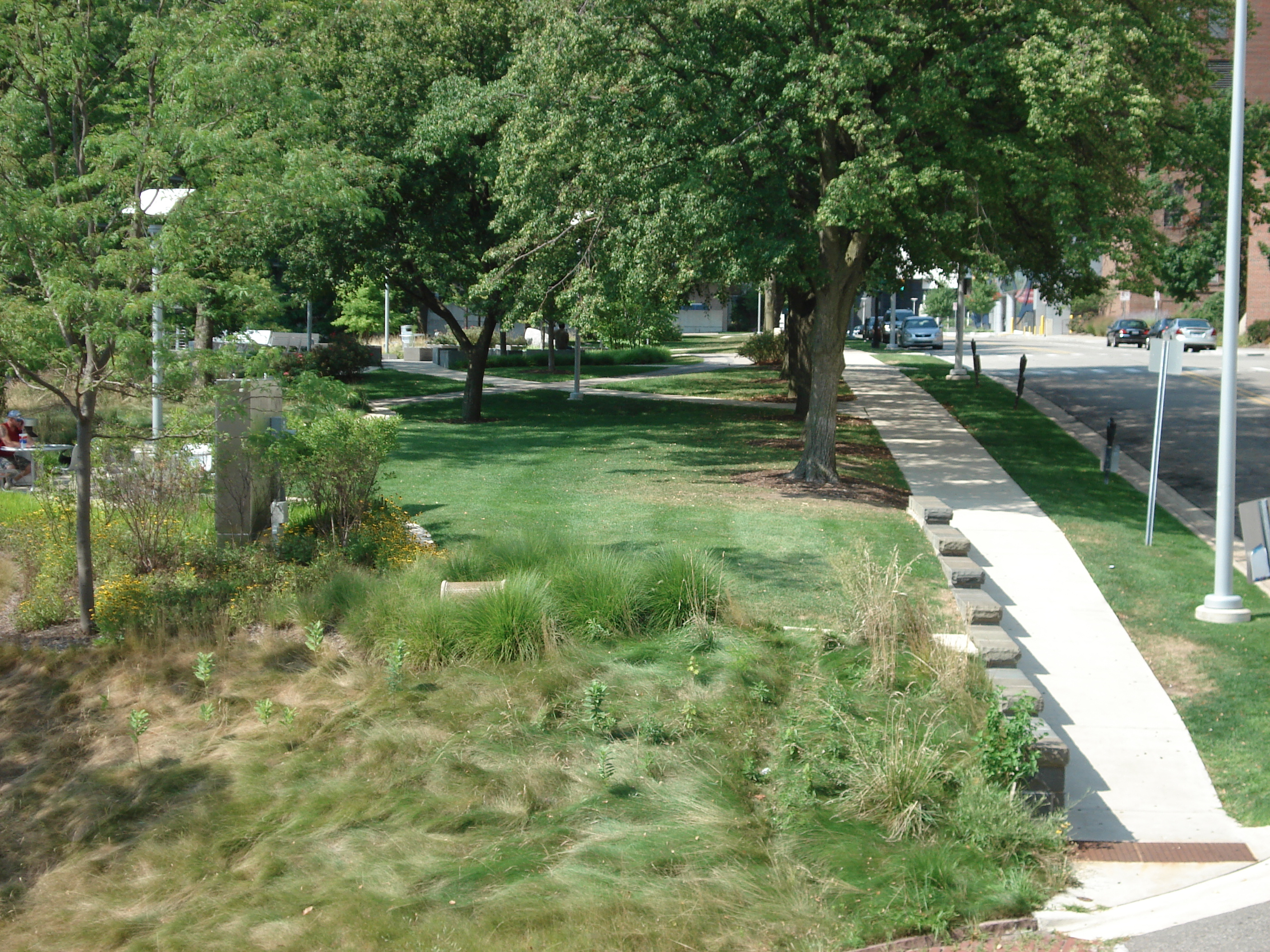
- Crescent Park - viewed from the south
- Interactive map of Crescent Park
- Location: Kent County, MI, USA
- Coordinates: 42°58′08″N 85°40′00″W
- Area: 1.06 acres (46,000 sq ft)
- Created: established 1858, renovated 2010
- Open: Year round
- Parking: Metered parking

Crescent Park is a city park located in the north-east quadrant of Grand Rapids, Michigan. Although small in size, it provides a quiet patch of green space near to the heart of the growing city.

== History ==
Crescent Park is thought to be Grand Rapids’ oldest park. The land was deeded to the city for use as a park in October 1858, and received its name from the outline of the land, a half-moon shape originally bounded by roads. The west side of the park contains a steep hill which was originally bisected by a flight of 56 stone steps. Just east of the head of the steps was a water fountain.

== Renovation ==
Crescent Park was renovated in 2010 in conjunction with the expansion of the Van Andel Institute. Friends of Crescent Park, a nonprofit organization, was created to renovate and maintain the park. The new park contains a plaza in tribute to those who have found hope from the many medical facilities around the park and along the Medical Mile.

== Amenities ==
Metal picnic tables, stone benches, metered parking on Bostwick Ave, long curving stairway, view of downtown Grand Rapids, lawn area, shaded grass, curving walkways, cancer survivor plaza
