= List of Alpha Omega Alpha chapters =

Alpha Omega Alpha is an honor society in the field of medicine. It was established in 1902 at the University of Illinois College of Medicine and expanded to include chapters across the United States and in Canada and Lebanon.

Following is a list of chapters, with active chapters in bold and inactive chapters in italics.

Chapter	Charter date and range	Institution	Location	Status	Ref.
**Alpha of Illinois**	August 24, 1902	University of Illinois College of Medicine	Chicago, Illinois	Active	
**Beta of Illinois**	December 13, 1902	Pritzker School of Medicine	Chicago, Illinois	Active	
**Gamma of Illinois**	February 7, 1903	Feinberg School of Medicine	Evanston, Illinois	Active	
**Alpha of Ohio**	February 1903	Case Western Reserve University School of Medicine	Cleveland, Ohio	Active	(Note: Chapter formed at Western Reserve University, which merged to form Case Western Reserve University.)
**Alpha of Pennsylvania**	March 1903	Sidney Kimmel Medical College	Philadelphia, Pennsylvania	Active	(Note: Chapter formed at Jefferson Medical College, which merged to form Thomas Jefferson University.)
**Beta of Pennsylvania**	April 4, 1903	Perelman School of Medicine	Philadelphia, Pennsylvania	Active	
**Alpha of Missouri**	May 16, 1905	Washington University School of Medicine	St. Louis, Missouri	Active	
Alpha of Massachusetts	February 1, 1906	Harvard Medical School	Boston, Massachusetts	Inactive	
Alpha of California	February 10, 1906	UCSF School of Medicine	San Francisco, California	Inactive	(Note: Chapter formed at the Medical Department of the University of California, which became UCSF School of Medicine in the 1960s.)
**Alpha of Maryland**	April 20, 1906	Johns Hopkins School of Medicine	Baltimore, Maryland	Active	
**Alpha of Ontario**	November 12, 1906	University of Toronto Faculty of Medicine	Toronto, Ontario	Not Active	
**Alpha of New York**	November 1, 1907	Columbia University College of Physicians and Surgeons	Manhattan, New York City, New York	Active	
**Alpha of Michigan**	December 10, 1907	University of Michigan Medicine	Ann Arbor, Michigan	Active	
**Alpha of Minnesota**	January 15, 1908	University of Minnesota Medical School	Minneapolis, Minnesota	Active	
**Beta of New York**	May 2, 1910	Weill Cornell Medicine	New York City, New York	Active	
**Gamma of New York**	February 15, 1911	State University of New York Upstate Medical University	Syracuse, New York	Active	(Note: Chapter was chartered at Syracuse University College of Medicine, which became State University of New York Upstate Medical University in 1950.)
Alpha of Quebec	November 27, 1911	McGill University Faculty of Medicine and Health Sciences	Montreal, Quebec, Canada	Inactive	
**Alpha of Nebraska**	November 2, 1914	University of Nebraska Medical Center	Omaha, Nebraska	Active	
**Alpha of Louisiana**	December 10, 1914	Tulane University School of Medicine	New Orleans, Louisiana	Active	
**Beta of Ohio**	February 15, 1916	University of Cincinnati Health	Cincinnati, Ohio	Active	
**Gamma of Pennsylvania**	April 10, 1916	University of Pittsburgh School of Medicine	Pittsburgh, Pennsylvania	Active	
**Alpha of Indiana**	June 2, 1916	Indiana University School of Medicine	Indianapolis, Indiana	Active	
**Alpha of Virginia**	November 15, 1919	University of Virginia School of Medicine	Charlottesville, Virginia	Active	
**Alpha of Iowa**	May 15, 1920	Roy J. and Lucille A. Carver College of Medicine	Iowa City, Iowa	Active	
**Alpha of Texas**	June 25, 1920	McGovern Medical School	Houston, Texas	Active	
Alpha of Connecticut	December 5, 1920	Yale School of Medicine	New Haven, Connecticut	Inactive	
**Alpha of Tennessee**	March 1, 1923	Vanderbilt University School of Medicine	Nashville, Tennessee	Active	
**Delta of New York**	December 10, 1923	New York University Grossman School of Medicine	New York City, New York	Active	
**Alpha of Oregon**	December 10, 1923	Oregon Health & Science University	Portland, Oregon	Active	
**Beta of Missouri**	March 10, 1924	Saint Louis University School of Medicine	St. Louis, Missouri	Active	
**Epsilon of New York**	December 1, 1924	Jacobs School of Medicine and Biomedical Sciences	Buffalo, New York	Active	
**Alpha of Kentucky**	May 24, 1926	University of Louisville School of Medicine	Louisville, Kentucky	Active	
**Alpha of Colorado**	June 3, 1926	University of Colorado School of Medicine	Aurora, Colorado	Active	
**Alpha of Wisconsin**	June 4, 1926	University of Wisconsin School of Medicine and Public Health	Madison, Wisconsin	Active	
**Alpha of Georgia**	June 4, 1926	Medical College of Georgia	Augusta, Georgia	Active	
**Beta of California**	April 25, 1929	Stanford University School of Medicine	Stanford, California	Active	(Note: Now operates as an association.)
**Zeta of New York**	May 2, 1929	University of Rochester School of Medicine and Dentistry	Rochester, New York	Active	
**Alpha of Kansas**	December 13, 1930	University of Kansas School of Medicine	Kansas City, Kansas	Active	
**Alpha of North Carolina**	April 1, 1931	Duke University School of Medicine	Durham, North Carolina	Active	
**Gamma of Ohio**	June 5, 1933	Ohio State University College of Medicine	Columbus, Ohio	Active	
Delta of Pennsylvania	April 27, 1934	Woman's Medical College of Pennsylvania	Philadelphia, Pennsylvania	Inactive	
**Beta of Georgia**	May 29, 1939	Emory University School of Medicine	Atlanta, Georgia	Active	
**Beta of Massachusetts**	December 2, 1940	Tufts University School of Medicine	Boston, Massachusetts	Active	
**Beta of Virginia**	December 4, 1940	VCU Medical Center	Richmond, Virginia	Active	
**Beta of Tennessee**	October 24, 1941	University of Tennessee Health Science Center	Memphis, Tennessee	Active	
Beta of Ontario	February 18, 1942	University of Western Ontario	London, Ontario	Inactive	
**Beta of Michigan**	February 19, 1942	Wayne State University School of Medicine	Detroit, Michigan	Active	
**Gamma of Massachusetts**	November 12, 1948	Boston University School of Medicine	Boston, Massachusetts	Active	
**Eta of New York**	November 13, 1948	SUNY Downstate Health Sciences University	New York City, New York	Active	
**Beta of North Carolina**	November 19, 1948	Wake Forest School of Medicine	Winston-Salem, North Carolina	Active	
Beta of Wisconsin	April 4, 1949	Marquette University College of Health Sciences	Milwaukee, Wisconsin	Inactive	
**Beta of Louisiana**	April 28, 1949	LSU Health Sciences Center New Orleans	New Orleans, Louisiana	Active	
**Alpha of Utah**	November 10, 1949	University of Utah School of Medicine	Salt Lake City, Utah	Active	
**Gamma of California**	November 14, 1949	Keck School of Medicine of USC	Los Angeles, California	Active	
**Beta of Texas**	November 17, 1949	Baylor University Medical Center	Waco, Texas	Active	
**Beta of Maryland**	December 9, 1949	University of Maryland School of Medicine	Baltimore, Maryland	Active	
**Theta of New York**	December 10, 1949	Albany Medical College	Albany, New York	Active	
**Alpha of Alabama**	April 7, 1950	University of Alabama at Birmingham School of Medicine	Birmingham, Alabama	Active	
**Alpha of Washington**	June 8, 1950	University of Washington School of Medicine	Seattle, Washington	Active	
**Gamma of Texas**	November 10, 1950	University of Texas Southwestern Medical Center	Dallas, Texas	Active	
**Epsilon of Pennsylvania**	December 1, 1950	Temple University School of Medicine	Philadelphia, Pennsylvania	Active	
**Zeta of Pennsylvania**	November 20, 1952	Drexel University College of Medicine	Philadelphia, Pennsylvania	Active	
**Alpha of Vermont**	November 21, 1952	Robert Larner College of Medicine	Burlington, Vermont	Active	
**Alpha of South Carolina**	March 20, 1953	Medical University of South Carolina	Charleston, South Carolina	Active	
**Alpha of Oklahoma**	May 1, 1953	University of Oklahoma College of Medicine	Oklahoma City, Oklahoma	Active	
**Gamma of North Carolina**	June 4, 1954	UNC School of Medicine	Chapel Hill, North Carolina	Active	
**Alpha of District of Columbia**	October 15, 1954	George Washington University School of Medicine & Health Sciences	Washington, D.C.	Active	
**Beta of District of Columbia**	October 16, 1954	Georgetown University School of Medicine	Washington, D.C.	Active	
Alpha of British Columbia	November 12, 1954	UBC Faculty of Medicine	Vancouver, British Columbia, Canada	Inactive	
**Gamma of District of Columbia**	May 14, 1955	Howard University College of Medicine	Washington, D.C.	Active	
**Alpha of Arkansas**	May 23, 1955	University of Arkansas for Medical Sciences	Little Rock, Arkansas	Active	
**Delta of California**	January 3, 1956	David Geffen School of Medicine at UCLA	Los Angeles, California	Active	
**Alpha of Puerto Rico**	March 7, 1956	University of Puerto Rico School of Medicine	San Juan, Puerto Rico	Active	
**Epsilon of California**	1957	Loma Linda University School of Medicine	Loma Linda, California	Active	
**Beta of Nebraska**	1957	Creighton University School of Medicine	Omaha, Nebraska	Active	
**Iota of New York**	1957	New York Medical College	Valhalla, New York	Active	
**Alpha of Mississippi**	1957	University of Mississippi School of Medicine	Oxford, Mississippi	Active	
**Gamma of Tennessee**	1957	Meharry Medical College	Nashville, Tennessee	Active	
**Gamma of Missouri**	1957	University of Missouri School of Medicine	Columbia, Missouri	Active	
**Alpha of Lebanon**	1958	American University of Beirut Faculty of Medicine	Beirut, Lebanon	Active	
Alpha of Nova Scotia	1958	Dalhousie University Faculty of Medicine	Halifax, Nova Scotia, Canada	Inactive	
Alpha of Alberta	1958	University of Alberta Faculty of Medicine and Dentistry	Edmonton, Alberta, Canada	Inactive	
**Alpha of Florida**	1959	Miller School of Medicine	Miami, Florida	Active	
**Kappa of New York**	1959	Albert Einstein College of Medicine	New York City, New York	Active	
**Beta of Florida**	1960	University of Florida College of Medicine	Gainesville, Florida	Active	
**Alpha of West Virginia**	1962	West Virginia University School of Medicine	Morgantown, West Virginia	Active	
**Alpha of New Mexico**	1968	University of New Mexico School of Medicine	Albuquerque, New Mexico	Active	
**Gamma of Louisiana**	1973	LSU Health Sciences Center Shreveport	Shreveport, Louisiana	Active	
**Zeta of Texas**	1974	Texas Tech University Health Sciences Center School of Medicine	Lubbock, Texas	Active	
**Delta of Ohio**	1974	University of Toledo College of Medicine and Life Sciences	Toledo, Ohio	Active	
**Alpha of South Dakota**	1978	University of South Dakota Sanford School of Medicine	Vermillion, Sioux Falls, Rapid City, and Yankton, South Carolina	Active	
**Zeta of Ohio**	1982	Northeast Ohio Medical University	Rootstown, Ohio	Active	
**Delta of Tennessee**	1985	East Tennessee State University James H. Quillen College of Medicine	Johnson City, Tennessee	Active	
	1985	University of Nevada, Reno School of Medicine	Reno, Nevada	Active	
**Gamma of Georgia**	1989	Morehouse School of Medicine	Atlanta, Georgia	Active	
**Beta of Puerto RIco**	1990	Ponce Health Sciences University	Ponce, Puerto Rico	Active	
**Alpha of Hawaii**	1990	John A. Burns School of Medicine	Honolulu, Hawaii	Active	
**Delta of Massachusetts**	1996	UMass Chan Medical School	Worcester, Massachusetts	Active	
**Gamma of Puerto Rico**	1990–2020	Universidad Central del Caribe	Bayamón, Puerto Rico	Active	
**Delta of Michigan**	2011	Oakland University William Beaumont School of Medicine	Auburn Hills, Michigan	Active	
**Epsilon of Florida**	2012	FIU Herbert Wertheim College of Medicine	Miami-Dade County, Florida	Active	
	2012	Boonshoft School of Medicine	Dayton, Ohio	Active	
	2014	Geisinger Commonwealth School of Medicine	Pennsylvania	Active	
**Nu of New York**	2015	Zucker School of Medicine	Hempstead, New York	Active	
**Beta of Connecticut**	2016	University of Connecticut School of Medicine	Farmington, Connecticut	Active	
**Gamma of New Jersey**	June 2017	Cooper Medical School of Rowan University	Camden, New Jersey	Active	
**Delta of Puerto Rico**	August 13, 2020	San Juan Bautista School of Medicine	Caguas, Puerto Rico	Active	
**Zeta of Michigan**	2021	Central Michigan University College of Medicine	Mount Pleasant, Michigan	Active	
	April 2021	UNLV School of Medicine	Paradise, Nevada	Active	
**Epsilon of Illinois**	2022	Stritch School of Medicine	Chicago, Illinois	Active	
**Xi of New York**	February 2024	CUNY School of Medicine	Manhattan, New York City, New York	Active	
**Beta of Arizona**	2024	University of Arizona College of Medicine – Phoenix	Phoenix, Arizona	Active	
		Geisel School of Medicine	Hanover, New Hampshire	Active	
		ECU Brody School of Medicine	Greenville, North Carolina	Active	
		Eastern Virginia Medical School	Norfolk, Virginia	Active	
		Charles E. Schmidt College of Medicine	Boca Raton, Florida	Active	
		Florida State University College of Medicine	Tallahassee, Florida	Active	
		Icahn School of Medicine at Mount Sinai	New York City, New York	Active	
		Joan C. Edwards School of Medicine	Huntington, West Virginia	Active	
		Medical College of Wisconsin	Milwaukee, Wisconsin	Active	
		Mercer University School of Medicine	Macon, Georgia	Active	
**Gamma of Michigan**		Michigan State University College of Human Medicine	East Lansing, Michigan	Active	
**Theta of Florida**		Dr. Kiran C. Patel College of Allopathic Medicine	Davie, Florida	Active	
		Penn State University College of Medicine	Hershey, Pennsylvania	Active	
		Renaissance School of Medicine at Stony Brook University	Stony Brook, New York	Active	
		Robert Wood Johnson Medical School	New Brunswick, New Jersey	Active	
		Rosalind Franklin University of Medicine and Science	North Chicago, Illinois	Active	
		Rush Medical College	Chicago, Illinois	Active	
**Beta of New Jersey**		New Jersey Medical School	Newark, New Jersey	Active	
**Eta of Illinois**		Southern Illinois University School of Medicine	Springfield, Illinois	Active	
		Texas A&M School of Medicine	Bryan, Texas	Active	
		Paul L. Foster School of Medicine	El Paso, Texas	Active	
**Gamma of Maryland**		Uniformed Services University of the Health Sciences	Bethesda, Maryland	Active	
		University of Arizona College of Medicine – Tucson	Tucson, Arizona	Active	
		UC Davis School of Medicine	Davis, California	Active	
		University of California, Irvine School of Medicine	Irvine, California	Active	
**Zeta of Florida**		University of Central Florida College of Medicine	Orlando, Florida	Active	
		University of Kentucky College of Medicine	Lexington, Kentucky	Active	
		University of Missouri–Kansas City School of Medicine	Kansas City, Missouri	Active	
		University of North Dakota School of Medicine and Health Sciences	Grand Forks, North Dakota	Active	
**Beta of Alabama**		Frederick P. Whiddon College of Medicine	Mobile, Alabama	Active	
		School of Medicine Columbia	Columbia, South Carolina	Active	
		School of Medicine Greenville	Greenville, South Carolina	Active	
**Gamma of Florida**		University of South Florida College of Medicine	Tampa, Florida	Active	
		Dell Medical School	Austin, Texas	Active	
		Long School of Medicine	San Antonio, Texas	Active	
		University of Texas Medical Branch	Galveston, Texas	Active	
		Virginia Tech Carilion School of Medicine and Research Institute	Roanoke, Virginia	Active	
		Alpert Medical School	Providence, Rhode Island	Active	
**Epsilon of Michigan**		Western Michigan University Homer Stryker M.D. School of Medicine	Kalamazoo, Michigan	Active	
