= Joel Kahn =

American cardiologist and integrative medicine practitioner

- Born: May 19, 1959 (age 66)
- Occupation: Cardiologist

Joel K. Kahn (born May 19, 1959) is an American cardiologist, integrative medicine practitioner and promoter of whole food plant-based nutrition.

== Biography ==
Kahn obtained a BA in 1980 and MD in 1983 from the University of Michigan. He is a Clinical Professor of Medicine at Wayne State University School of Medicine and Associate Professor of Medicine at Oakland University William Beaumont School of Medicine. He is the founder of the Kahn Center for Cardiac Longevity in Bingham Farms, Michigan. Kahn is a Fellow of the American College of Cardiology and a member of the Physicians Committee for Responsible Medicine. He has authored articles for HuffPost and the Reader's Digest.

Kahn has been a vegan since 1977. He promotes a whole-food plant-based diet consisting of fruit, vegetables, legumes, nuts, seeds and whole grains to prevent chronic disease. During his lifetime he aims to prevent a million heart attacks. He has commented that "there is no more effective way to prevent and reverse heart disease than eating a plant-based diet naturally low in oils, sugar, and salt." He has noted from measuring the blood and skin levels of his patients that both omnivores and vegans are frequently low in vitamin B12, iodine, omega-3, taurine and vitamin K2 and that vitamin supplements can provide the correct amounts. He advises his patients to support healthy nitric oxide levels by getting more exercise and juicing. He has credited Caldwell Esselstyn and Dean Ornish as influencing his work.

In 2015, Kahn and his wife Karen and son Daniel opened a vegan café, the GreenSpace Café in Ferndale, Michigan. It closed in February 2020.

== Selected publications ==
- The Whole Heart Solution (Trusted Media Brands, 2014)
- Dead Execs Don't Get Bonuses: The Ultimate Guide To Survive Your Career With A Healthy Heart (Book Publishing Company, 2018)
- The Plant-Based Solution: America's Healthy Heart Doc's Plan to Power Your Health (Sounds True, 2018)
- Lipoprotein(a): The Heart's Quiet Killer (2020)
