= Corewell Health William Beaumont University Hospital =

Hospital in Royal Oak, Michigan, US

- Corewell Health

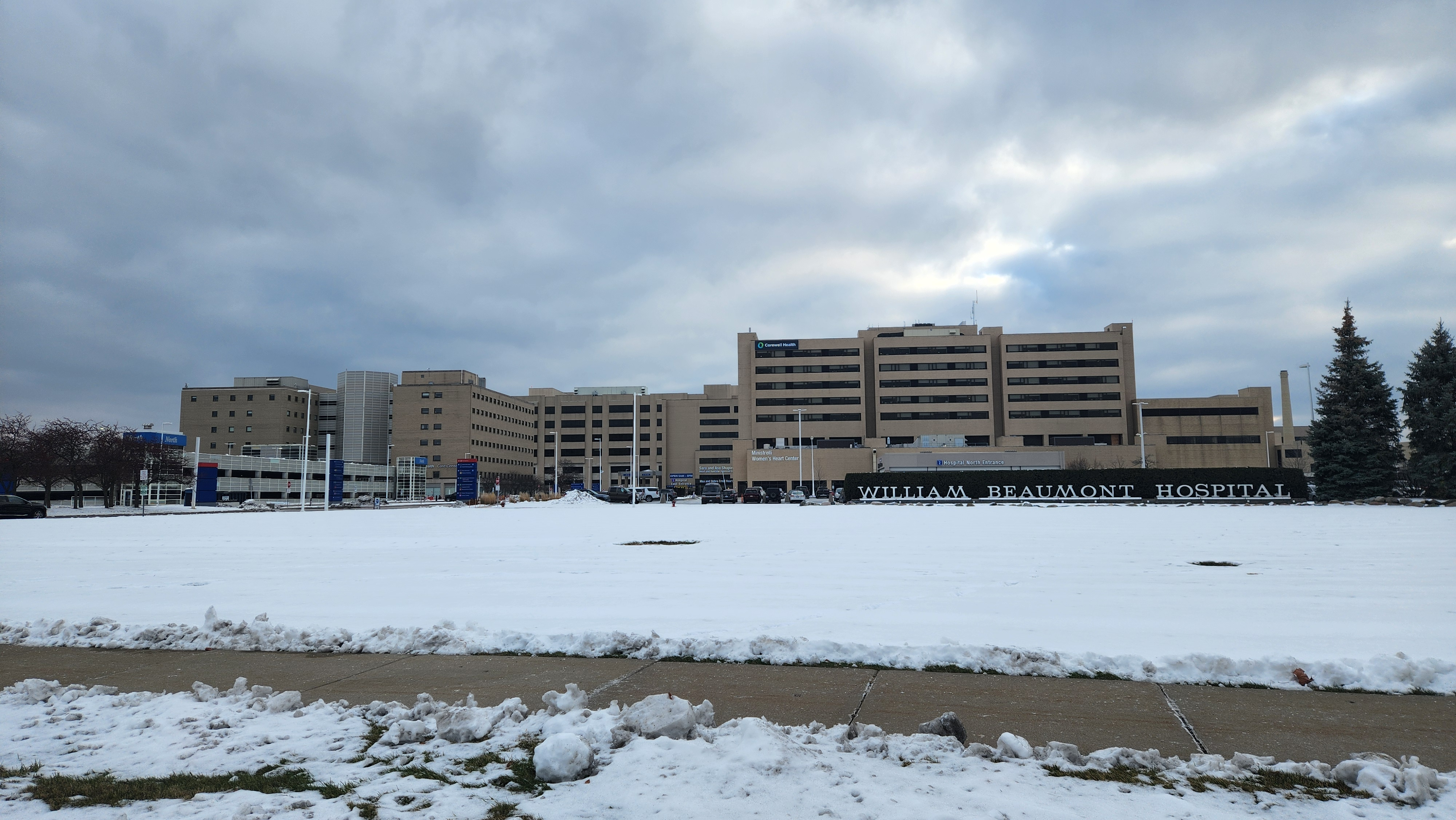

Geography
- Location: 3601 W 13 Mile Road; Royal Oak, Michigan, United States
- Coordinates: 42.5146°N 83.1926°W

Organization
- Type: Teaching
- Affiliated university: Oakland University William Beaumont School of Medicine

Services
- Emergency department: Level I Adult Trauma Center / Level II Pediatric Trauma Center
- Beds: 1131

Helipads
- Helipad: FAA LID: 32MI
| Number | Length | | Surface |
| Number | ft | m | Surface |
|---|---|---|---|
| H1 | 53 x 53 | 16 × 16 | concrete |

History
- Former name: William Beaumont Hospital (until 2022)
- Constructed: 1953
- Opened: January 1955

Links
- Website: www.beaumont.org/locations/beaumont-hospital-royal-oak
- Lists: Hospitals in Michigan

Corewell Health William Beaumont University Hospital is a 1131-bed acute care teaching hospital in Royal Oak, Michigan. Opened in 1955, it is the flagship facility of Corewell Health, and the namesake of its former parent, Beaumont Health. It is affiliated with the Oakland University William Beaumont School of Medicine as its primary teaching affiliate. It includes Level I adult and Level II pediatric trauma centers, and has an onsite helipad to receive medivac patients from across the region.

== History ==
The hospital was built on the site of what was once the Sharp family farm. Groundbreaking was on June 19, 1953. The hospital opened with 238 beds on January 24, 1955. It was formerly known as William Beaumont Hospital.

== Beaumont Children's ==
Beaumont Children's, is an acute care children's hospital in Royal Oak, Michigan. It is affiliated with the Oakland University William Beaumont School of Medicine and located within the larger Beaumont Hospital, Royal Oak. The hospital consists of 101 pediatric beds and provides comprehensive pediatric specialties and subspecialties to infants, children, teens, and young adults aged 0–21 throughout the region. Beaumont Children's shares the onsite helipad for the attached Beaumont Hospital, Royal Oak and is an ACS verified level II pediatric trauma center, one of the only ones in the region.

The hospital features a regional pediatric intensive-care unit and an American Academy of Pediatrics verified level III neonatal intensive care unit.

Beaumont Children's Hospital, now Beaumont Children's, was announced in 2009. Eighty-three sub-specialists, a 40-bed pediatric unit, eight-bed pediatric ICU and 64-bed NICU had been in place at Beaumont, Royal Oak since 2004. In 2008, Beaumont joined the Children's Hospital Association. Facilities include a dedicated specialty inpatient pediatric unit at Beaumont, Royal Oak and inpatient units at the Beaumont hospitals in Troy, Dearborn and Farmington Hills for children with less serious conditions. Specialty pediatric services including emergency care, hematology-oncology, gastroenterology, endocrinology, cardiology, neurology, newborn and pediatric intensive care, pediatric surgery and craniofacial surgery are available at outpatient locations throughout Metro Detroit.

Beaumont Children's cares for more than 100,000 pediatric emergency and after-hours visits every year and 17,000 babies are delivered each year as well. Beaumont Children's is a member of the Children's Hospital Association and the only Southeast Michigan affiliate of Children's Miracle Network Hospitals.

== Heliport ==
William Beaumont Hospital Heliport
- IATA: none; ICAO: none; FAA LID: 32MI

Summary
- Airport type: Private use, Medical Use
- Owner: Beaumont Hospital, Royal Oak
- Operator: Beaumont Health
- Location: Royal Oak, Michigan, United States
- Elevation AMSL: 705 ft (215 m)
- Coordinates: 42°30′54″N 83°11′39″W
- Interactive map of William Beaumont Hospital Heliport

Helipads
| Number | Length | | Surface |
| Number | ft | m | Surface |
|---|---|---|---|
| H1 | 66 | 20 | Concrete |

William Beaumont Hospital Heliport is a heliport located in Royal Oak, Michigan, United States. It is operated by Beaumont Hospital Royal Oak of Beaumont Health. Currently there is only one helipad, made of concrete. The helipad is 66 feet square [20m x 20m] so only one helicopter can land or take off at one time. A second helipad is being added.

In 2012 Beaumont Hospital, Royal Oak became the co-base of operation of Beaumont One an American Eurocopter EC135 helicopter. The helicopter is operated by PHI Air Medical. Beaumont One is co-based at William Beaumont Hospital Heliport and Oakland/Troy Airport in Troy, Michigan.

== See also ==
- Oakland University William Beaumont School of Medicine
- Beaumont Health
