= Oakland University William Beaumont School of Medicine =

Private medical school near Rochester, Michigan, US

Coordinates: 42°40′27.9″N 83°12′55.9″W

- Type: Private Allopathic (MD) Medical School
- Established: 2008
- Dean: Christopher F. Carpenter, M.D
- Students: 125 per class, 500 total
- Location: Auburn Hills, Michigan, U.S.
- Website: www.oakland.edu/medicine

The Oakland University William Beaumont School of Medicine (OUWB) is the allopathic (MD) medical school at Oakland University in Auburn Hills, Michigan. It is operated in partnership with Corewell Health, and is named for U.S. Army surgeon William Beaumont, who is known for his research on human digestion.

== History ==
Oakland University (Oakland) was founded in 1957 and William Beaumont Health System (Beaumont, WBHS) was founded in 1955. William Beaumont Hospital's original name as it was being built was "Oakland Hospital", named for the county. To distinguish itself from nearby Oakwood Hospital, Oakland Hospital changed its name before opening.

In January 2007, Oakland and Beaumont submitted a letter of intent to the LCME to formally begin the process of creating a new allopathic medical school. OUWB was approved and founded on July 31, 2008 with the inaugural class beginning enrollment in the fall semester of 2011. OUWB was the fourth allopathic medical school to open in the US State of Michigan, the first new medical school in the state in 47 years, and the first private medical school in the state. Since 2009, the university has a program to retrain area automotive workers in the field of nursing, with many students emerging to work at the Beaumont Hospital.

In 2011, over 3,000 prospective students applied for the 50 seats in the inaugural class (Class of 2015). In 2012, OUWB added 75 new students, with 100 more joining in 2013 and 2014 each for a total of 325 students. In 2015, OUWB received full accreditation from the LCME and the class size grew to its current capacity of 125. In March 2015, OUWB's Charter Class achieved a 100% match rate when matching to their residency positions.

OUWB receives around 7,000 applications yearly.

In March 2021, Oakland University and Beaumont Health extended their affiliation agreement through 2041; following Beaumont's 2022 merger with Spectrum Health, the program was taken over by the merged organization, Corewell Health.

== Education ==
The curriculum at OUWB follows an organ system-based preclinical curriculum with longitudinal courses that continue throughout the clinical years.

=== Preclinical ===
The fall semester of M1 year focuses on Anatomical Foundations of Clinical Practice and Biomedical Foundations of Clinical Practice, with organ system-based courses beginning in the winter semester of M1 year. In the M2 year, organ system-based units and longitudinal courses continue.

The longitudinal courses are the Art and Practice of Medicine (APM), Medical Humanities and Clinical Bioethics (MHCB), the Promotion and Maintenance of Health (PMH), a personal and professional development course (PRISM, Promoting Reflection and Individual Growth Through Support and Mentoring), and a research course (Embark). Embark requires each student to work to the advancement of medicine by undertaking a scholarly project with a faculty mentor.

=== Clinical ===
The clinical years consist of rotations at various sites affiliated with the William Beaumont Health System, as well as the continuation of MHCB, PRISM, and Embark.

The M3 clinical rotations include 8 weeks each of Internal Medicine, Pediatrics, and Surgery, 5 weeks of Obstetrics and Gynecology, 5 weeks of Psychiatry, 4 weeks of Neurology, 1 week of Ophthalmology, 6 weeks of Family Medicine, and an optional 2 week elective rotation.

The M4 clinical rotations includes 4 weeks or 8 weeks of Emergency Medicine, 2 weeks of Anesthesiology & Pain Medicine, 2 weeks of Diagnostic Medicine, as well as Sub-Internships and elective rotations.

== Facilities ==
Located on the main campus of Oakland University, OUWB is housed in O'Dowd Hall. In 2022, O'Dowd Hall began a $9.7 million renovation aimed to create new study spaces, classrooms, offices, outdoor seating, and an entryway with a reception area. Students are further able to access the Medical Library located in the university's Kresge Library, the Hannah Hall of Science Anatomy Lab, the Oakland Center (student union) and the Recreation Center.

Medical education in the clinical years continues at several key sites operated by William Beaumont Health System.

=== Beaumont Health ===
System-wide, WBHS operates 1,911 beds at three main hospital locations. These are the 1,101-bed William Beaumont Hospital, Royal Oak, 530-bed William Beaumont Hospital, Troy, and the 280-bed William Beaumont Hospital, Grosse Pointe. Aside from the main teaching hospitals, students are able to rotate at several affiliated clinics, rehabilitation centers, and doctor's offices in Metro Detroit.

William Beaumont Hospital, Royal Oak is the 14th largest hospital in the country by bed size and is the 3rd largest provider of Medicare services in the United States. It is ranked by U.S. News & World Report as the #2 hospital in the state (behind University Hospital, University of Michigan), and is nationally ranked in 10 adult specialties. It operates the only Level I Trauma Center in Oakland or Macomb Counties, an area of about 2 million people. Since 2012, it has had an air medical-transportation service called Beaumont One.

Graduate medical education in the health system consists of 44 ACGME accredited residency programs, 33 ACGME accredited fellowship programs, and 16 programs for which ACGME does not accredit. As of January 2024, there are 924 active residents and fellows in WBHS.

In addition to OUWB, WBHS is also a teaching hospital for several other medical schools and nursing schools in the region.

- Beaumont, Farmington Hills and Beaumont, Trenton are affiliated with the Michigan State University College of Osteopathic Medicine
- Beaumont Behavioral Health is affiliated with Michigan State University College of Human Medicine and Wayne State University School of Medicine
- Beaumont, Dearborn, Wayne and Taylor are affiliated with Wayne State University School of Medicine
- Students from Wayne State University School of Nursing and Michigan State University School of Nursing train at various hospitals in the WBHS network.
