= McLaren Flint =

- McLaren Health Care Corporation

Geography
- Location: Flint, Michigan, United States
- Coordinates: 43.01409°N 83.73269°W

Organization
- Type: Teaching
- Affiliated university: Michigan State University College of Human Medicine

Services
- Beds: 378

History
- Founded: 1919

Links
- Website: www.mclaren.org/flint/mclaren-flint-home
- Lists: Hospitals in Michigan

McLaren Flint is a nonprofit, 378-bed tertiary teaching hospital located in Flint, Michigan, United States. It is affiliated with the Michigan State University College of Human Medicine's medical residency programs, including family medicine, internal medicine, general surgery, orthopedic surgery, radiology, and emergency medicine. McLaren also has a hematology/oncology fellowship program in partnership with Michigan State University and sponsors a surgical oncology fellowship program. McLaren Flint is a subsidiary of McLaren Health Care Corporation.

McLaren Northern Michigan received a 5-star rating from the Centers for Medicare and Medicaid Services in 2023, recognizing its high-quality facilities and services.

== History ==
McLaren Flint originated in 1919 as Women's Hospital, a 10-room maternity hospital at 808 Harrison Street, focusing on care for women and children. It was founded by Dr. Lucy Elliott and nurse Lillian Girard.

By mid-1920, Women's Hospital needed more space and moved to a remodeled house on six acres at 1900 Lapeer Street in Flint, opening in June 1923 with 29 rooms. Margaret McLaren became Superintendent of Women's Hospital in 1924, serving for over 30 years. In 1925, a new North wing was added, increasing the capacity to 40 rooms. The hospital received accreditation from the American College of Surgeons and the American Medical Society in 1928.

After raising $2.5 million from the community in the 1940s, the new 203-bed McLaren General Hospital was dedicated on September 12, 1951, at 401 S. Ballenger Highway in Flint. The hospital was renamed McLaren Regional Medical Center in 1990 after completing a new patient care tower.

In the following decades, McLaren expanded by acquiring hospitals in Lapeer, Bay City, Mount Clemens, and Lansing, forming the McLaren Health Care Corporation. The hospital's name was shortened to McLaren Flint in 2012 to reflect its association with other McLaren hospitals.
