= Spectrum Health =

American health care organization

Coordinates: 42°58′11.6″N 85°39′54.4″W

Spectrum Health System
- Company type: Not-for-profit
- Industry: Healthcare
- Founded: Sept. 19, 1997
- Defunct: February 1, 2022; 4 years ago
- Fate: Merged with Beaumont Health to form Corewell Health
- Headquarters: Grand Rapids, Michigan, US
- Area served: West Michigan
- Key people: Tina Freese-Decker, President & CEO; Julie Fream, Chair.
- Revenue: $6.9 Billion (2018)
- Number of employees: 39,000 total (2018)

Spectrum Health System was a not-for-profit, integrated, managed care health care organization based in West Michigan. It bought out Beaumont Health of Metro Detroit in 2022. The merger of the two hospital groups formed what is now known as Corewell Health. Spectrum Health's subsidiaries included hospitals, treatment facilities, urgent care facilities, as well as physician practices that served the western Michigan area. Priority Health was a subsidiary health plan with one million members. Spectrum Health was the largest employer in West Michigan at the time of the merger with 31,000 staff, 4,200 physicians and advanced practice providers, including 1,600 members of the Spectrum Health Medical Group, and 3,200 volunteers.

== History ==
Spectrum Health was formally incorporated on September 19, 1997, after a high-profile legal battle, combining Butterworth Health System of Grand Rapids and Blodgett Memorial Medical Center of East Grand Rapids, making it the largest health care organization in West Michigan. In August 2000, Richard C. Breon was hired to lead the organization as CEO, and sought to form an integrated health care system.

In 2012, Spectrum Health System was recognized as one of the Top 50 Integrated Health Care Networks in the United States by IMS Health.

In July 2018, Tina Freese-Decker was named CEO to succeed Richard Breon.

In October 2018 Spectrum closed on a merger with Lakeland Health, a health system in southwest Michigan consisting of 3 hospitals, 450 providers, and 4,000 employees. Spectrum Health Lakeland operated as a wholly owned subsidiary of Spectrum Health and had two governing boards.

=== Merger with Beaumont Health ===
In June 2021, Spectrum Health announced plans to merge with Beaumont Health. In 2022 Beaumont and Spectrum announced their merger was effective on February 1, 2022, because the federal government determined this would not violate antitrust regulations. The new system was temporarily called BHSH Health, with Spectrum Health CEO Tina Freese Decker as the head and with both existing headquarters operating. Corewell Health, was later made the name of the health system.

== Locations ==
=== Hospitals ===
Spectrum Health had facilities in numerous communities in western Michigan:

Hospital	Location	Beds	Trauma center	Opened	Notes
Helen DeVos Children's Hospital	Grand Rapids	241	Level I Pediatric	1970	Affiliated with Michigan State University
Spectrum Health Butterworth Hospital	Grand Rapids	852	Level I	1875	Founding member of Spectrum Health
Spectrum Health Blodgett Hospital	East Grand Rapids	248	Level III	1914	Founding member of Spectrum Health
Spectrum Health Gerber Memorial Health Services	Fremont	25	Level IV	1918	Merged with Spectrum in 2010
Spectrum Health Reed City Hospital	Reed City	64	Level IV	1884	Merged with Spectrum in 2010
Spectrum Health United Hospital	Greenville	88	Level IV	1915	Merged with Spectrum in 2003
Spectrum Health Zeeland Community Hospital	Zeeland	55	Level III	1921	Merged with Spectrum Health in 2011
Spectrum Health Ludington Hospital	Ludington	49	Level IV	1967	Merged with Spectrum Health in 2013
Spectrum Health Big Rapids Hospital	Big Rapids	49	Level IV	1878	Merged with Spectrum Health in 2013
Spectrum Health Pennock	Hastings	25	Level IV	1923	Merged with Spectrum Health in 2015
Spectrum Health Lakeland Medical Center	Saint Joseph	296	Level III	1899	Merged with Spectrum Health in 2018
Spectrum Health Lakeland Niles Hospital	Niles	89	Level IV	1899	Merged with Spectrum Health in 2018
Spectrum Health Lakeland Watervliet Hospital	Watervliet	49	Level IV	1899	Merged with Spectrum Health in 2018

=== Other facilities and services ===
Spectrum Health Continuing Care is West Michigan's largest provider of post-acute services, including rehabilitative, long-term acute, home and residential care. Spectrum Health has an air ambulance helicopter service, called Aeromed, that transports patients between accident scenes as well as between hospitals and the airport. Spectrum Health Visiting Nurses Association provides home care services in the West Michigan area.

The Lemmen-Holton Cancer Pavilion is an outpatient cancer center located in the Grand Rapids Medical Mile. It was developed to bring all cancer research and patient service delivery under one roof in the Spectrum Health System.

As of 2019 the organization has leased space in 26 places to house administrative employees. In 2019 it announced it would centralize its staff, totaling 1,200, into a single building in Downtown Grand Rapids. The plans call for it to have eight stories. The organization planned to spend $100 million. The Downtown Development Authority (DDA) of Grand Rapids approved Spectrum's plan in October 2021.
