= Corewell Health Farmington Hills Hospital =

Hospital in Michigan, US

Coordinates: 42°26′47.7″N 83°19′25.6″W

- Corewell Health

Geography
- Location: Farmington Hills, Michigan, United States

Organization
- Care system: Full care
- Type: Teaching
- Affiliated university: Michigan State University College of Osteopathic Medicine, Arizona College of Osteopathic Medicine

Services
- Emergency department: Level II trauma center
- Beds: 330

History
- Former names: Botsford Hospital (1965–2014); Beaumont Hospital Farmington Hills (2014–2022)
- Founded: 1965

Links
- Website: corewellhealth.org/locations/LOC0000193293/corewell-health-farmington-hills-hospital
- Lists: Hospitals in the United States

Corewell Health Farmington Hills Hospital, historically known as Botsford Hospital, is a 330-bed teaching hospital with level II trauma center status. Founded in 1965, the hospital is now affiliated with Corewell Health. The hospital earned three year accreditation from the American Osteopathic Association's Healthcare Facilities Accreditation Program in 2008.

== History ==
Dr. Allen Zieger opened his first hospital in 1944 in Detroit calling it the Zieger Osteopathic Hospital. In 1965, Zieger Osteopathic Hospital opened Botsford General Hospital at its current location on Grand River Avenue in then-Farmington Township.

In March 2014, Botsford Hospital merged with Beaumont Health and was renamed Beaumont Farmington Hills Hospital.

On November 5, 2014, Beaumont Farmington Hills hospital announced a $160 million expansion project which includes an expansion of the hospital's Emergency and Trauma Center, construction of a new critical care unit and creation of a dedicated observation unit. In addition, the plan calls for expanding and modernizing surgical services with nine new operating rooms. The expansion would include a five-story, 80-bed tower. The project is currently under construction.

== Medical education ==
Corewell Health Farmington Hills Hospital is a teaching hospital for the training of osteopathic physicians. It is a base hospital for:

- Michigan State University College of Osteopathic Medicine (MSUCOM)
- Arizona College of Osteopathic Medicine (AZCOM)
- Kansas City University of Medicine and Biosciences-College of Osteopathic Medicine (KCUCOM)

Current Residency programs

- Dermatology
- Diagnostic Radiology
- Emergency Medicine
- Family Practice / OMM
- Family Practice / NMM
- General Surgery
- Internal Medicine
- Neurology
- Obstetrics and Gynecology
- Orthopedic Surgery
- Otorhinolaryngology and Orofacial Plastic Surgery
- Plastic and Reconstructive Surgery
- Podiatry
- Urologic Surgery

Current Fellowships

- Cardiology
- Gastroenterology
- Nephrology
- Infectious Disease
- Pulmonary / Critical Care Medicine
- Spine Surgery
