= Stuart Sprague =

American nephrologist

Stuart M. Sprague is an American nephrologist and Clinical Professor of Medicine at the Pritzker School of Medicine. He received his undergraduate degree from Michigan State University and his doctorate from Michigan State University College of Human Medicine. He completed his internal medicine training at Rush-Presbyterian-St. Luke’s Medical Center in Chicago, and completed a nephrology clinical and research fellowship at the University of Chicago. He is a chief of the Division of Nephrology and Hypertension and a founder of Chronic Kidney Disease Clinic. In 1995 he joined NorthShore University HealthSystem and before that was a director of both the University of Chicago's Renal Bone Program and Hospitals Chronic Hemodialysis Unit. He has high interest in kidney stones, post transplant bone disease and, metabolic bone disease.
