= Grand Rapids Medical Mile =

Medical Mile
- Medical corridor of Grand Rapids
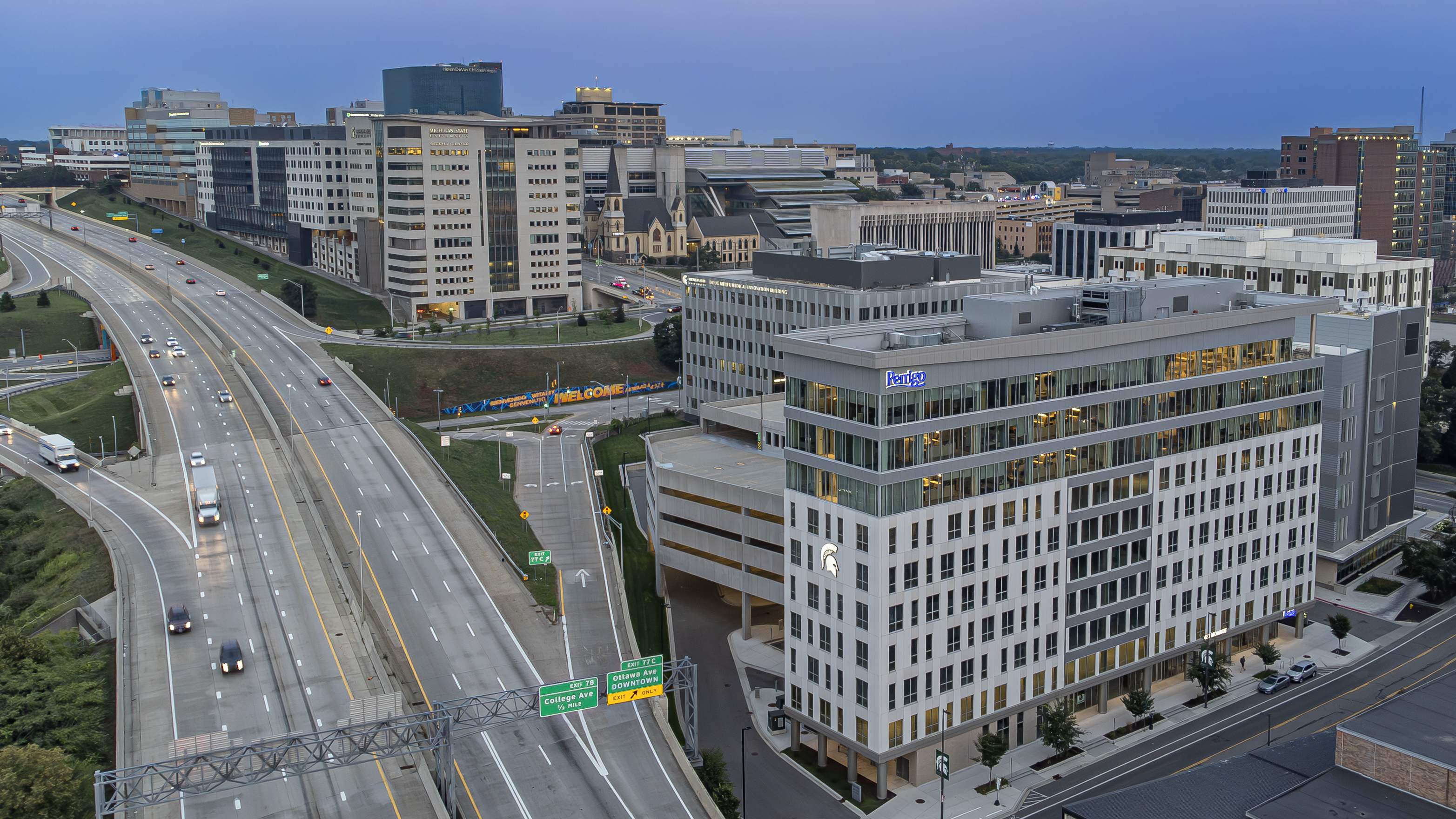
- Medical Mile seen beside Interstate 196
- Interactive map of Medical Mile
- Country: United States
- State: Michigan
- City: Grand Rapids

Grand Rapids Medical Mile is a designated area within the city of Grand Rapids, Michigan. It began with medical-related development in the Hillside District of Grand Rapids, bordering both sides of Michigan Street. More than a decade later it encompasses an area five times larger, expanding east further down Michigan St.and north across Interstate 196. It has also been referred to as Grand Rapids Medical Corridor, Michigan Street Medical Corridor, Health Hill, Medical Hill, and Pill Hill, among other names.

The corridor originated from the 1996 founding of Van Andel Institute by Jay and Betty Van Andel. It has since expanded to include the Grand Rapids Community College's Calkins Science Center across Bostwick Avenue, Corewell Health's expanded Butterworth Hospital complex, Grand Valley State University's Health Campus, and Michigan State University College of Human Medicine Secchia Center, among other facilities in the area.

== Van Andel Institute ==
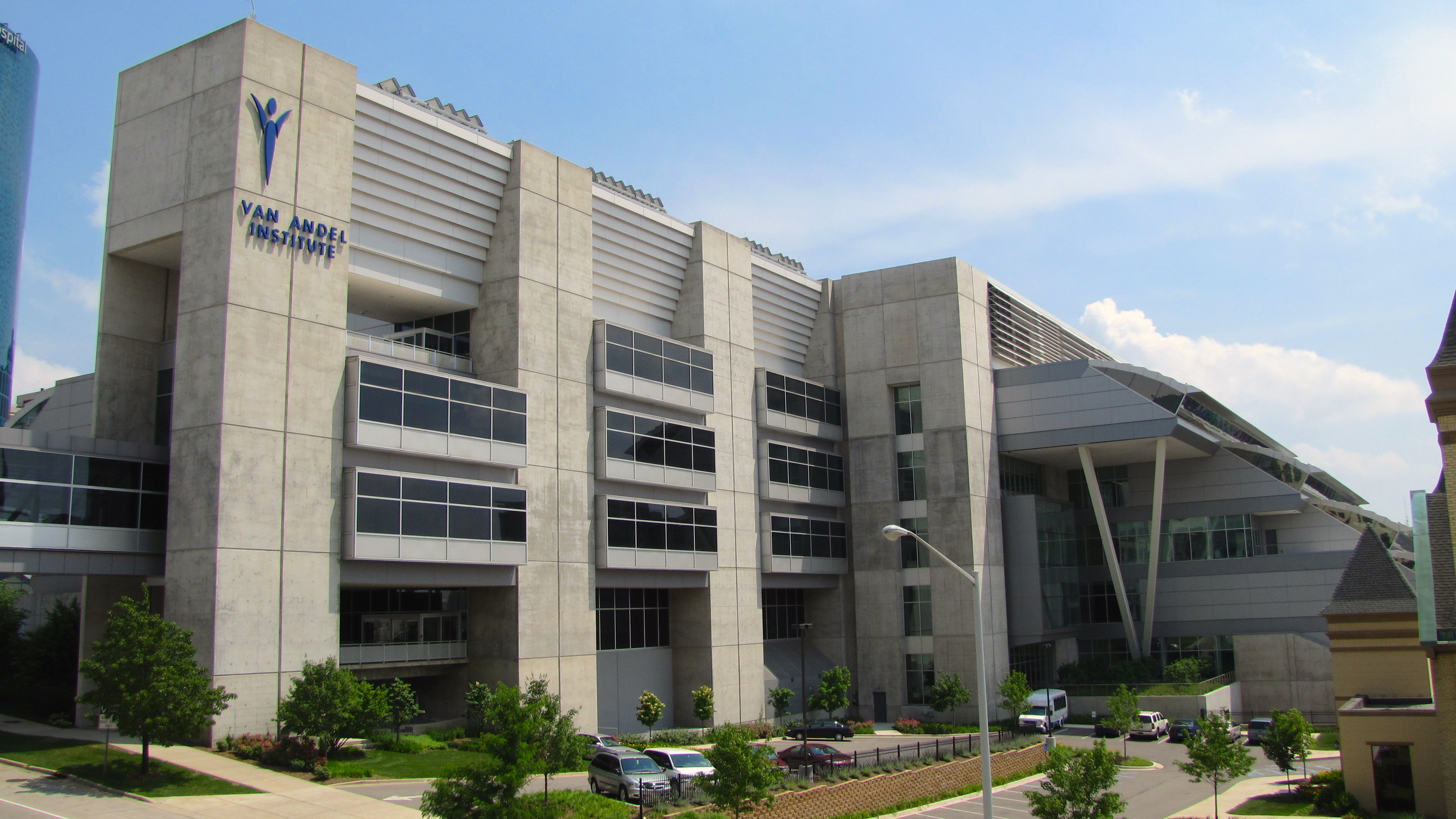
Van Andel Institute Phase 1

Van Andel Institute (VAI) is a research institution that primarily conducts cancer research, but also studies other diseases such as osteoporosis, heart disease, diabetes and Parkinson's disease. It was founded in 1996 by philanthropists Jay and Betty Van Andel. At the time "there was little scientific activity in Grand Rapids." The institute opened in 2000 and expanded in 2009. Initially, most of the research was funded by an endowment from Jay Van Andel, which has been estimated at $1 billion. Jay Van Andel suffered from Parkinson's disease; Betty suffered from Alzheimer's disease. Their son, Dave, is the current CEO.

The VAI facility was built in two phases. The $60 million first phase was 160,000 square feet (15,000 m^{2}) and included 40,000 square feet (3,700 m^{2}) of laboratory space. It also featured the 325-seat Tomatis Auditorium and the Cook-Hauenstein Hall. It is located on Bostwick Avenue with the north end on Michigan Street.

On May 17, 2005, VAI announced plans to expand. The expansion was approved by the City of Grand Rapids in October 2006, and construction for the expansion began on April 12, 2007. The cost of the expansion was $178 million, raised through donations and a bond. The second phase added an additional 242,000 square feet (22,500 m^{2}), including 95,000 square feet (8,800 m^{2}) of lab space. The new facility houses the Van Andel Education Institute's PhD-granting graduate school, which was founded in 2007. The building was designed by "world-renowned architect" Rafael Viñoly and is LEED platinum certified. The second phase added a 100-seat cafeteria and 90-seat conference center.

The institute has 270 employees. Over the next several years, it is expected to grow to about 800 employees, most of them research scientists. VAI operates on an annual budget of $40 million, much of which comes from research grants and donations. Numerous local schools have donated money to fund medical research. The VAI endowment allows all donations to go directly to research.

== Corewell Health ==
Corewell Health, formed from the merger of Beaumont Health and Spectrum Health, operates several facilities on Michigan Street.

=== Corewell Health Butterworth Hospital ===
Corewell Health Butterworth Hospital is the main Grand Rapids-area hospital for Corewell Health and is home to the only level I trauma center in West Michigan. It was founded by St. Mark's Episcopal Church in 1873. The first patients were limited to elderly women, but two years later, a new facility opened to allow a more diverse patient load. By 1887 a need for further expansion led Richard E. Butterworth to offer the present site of Michigan Street and Bostwick Avenue. On April 26, 1890, the new facility opened, and it was renamed four years later in honor of Mr. Butterworth, who was not alive to see the opening. In the 1920s, the Butterworth family donated enough to open a new 220-bed facility at the hospital's current location. A further expansion in the early 1950s increased the number of beds to 425. In 1973, the North Tower—another expansion—was completed, bringing the number of beds to 529. In 1987, Health Connections started Aero Med to provide air transport service, and in 1993 the Helen DeVos Women and Children's Center was opened.

=== Fred & Lena Meijer Heart Center ===
Opened in 2004, the Fred & Lena Meijer Heart Center was the combination of both of Corewell Health's heart programs from its Blodgett campus in East Grand Rapids, and the one at its Butterworth campus. It was built using the donations of over 3000 people donating almost $35 million and named after Frederik and Lena Meijer. The center has been named in the Solucient 100 Top Cardiovascular Hospitals multiple times. It also ranked number one in open heart surgeries performed in 2005. It is also Michigan's first chest pain center.

=== Helen DeVos Children's Hospital ===
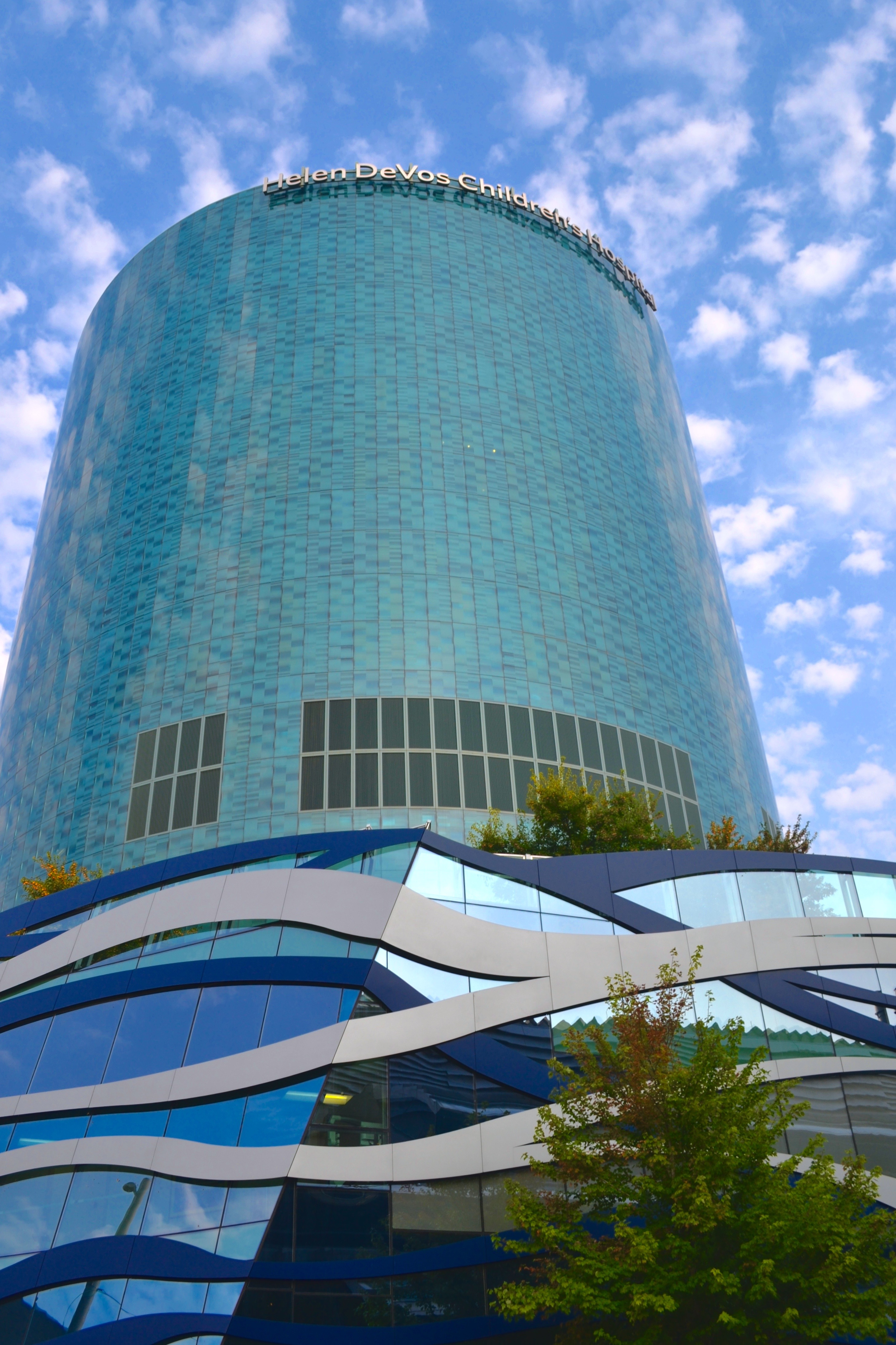
Helen DeVos Children's Hospital

The Helen DeVos Children's Hospital first opened on September 1, 1993. At the time of its opening, it was the only children's hospital in West Michigan. The hospital was started 20 years earlier by the Fremont, Michigan-based Gerber Baby Foods as a neonatal intensive care unit at Butterworth Hospital. The original $100,000 donation allowed it to be opened the next year, and in the next decade the need for more services grew substantially. In 1990, Richard and Helen DeVos donated $5 million to expand its services and to offer specialized pediatric care. They also donated $50 million in the $100 million cost for the new 14-story, 440,000-square-foot (41,000 m^{2}) facility. This facility called the Helen DeVos Children's Hospital wheeled its first kids through the doors on January 11, 2011. There are well over 200 beds and all are private rooms that view the city. The hospital is next door to a heliport.

=== Lemmen-Holton Cancer Pavilion ===
The Lemmen-Holton Cancer Pavilion was developed to bring all cancer research and patient service delivery of the West Michigan operations of Corewell Health under one roof. The land for the project was purchased in 2002 with a donation from Frederik and Lena Meijer. The $78 million facility opened on June 30, 2008. It is located across the street from Butterworth Hospital on Michigan Street and is connected to it by a tunnel. Since the location is also near the VAI, the hospital has a high rate of cancer patients on clinical trials: eight percent compared to the national rate of three percent. The Pavilion is named after two employees that worked for Meijer and advanced their way to the top of the company.

== Education ==
Many educational institutions dedicated to medical science are located along the corridor, such as Ferris State University, Grand Rapids Community College, Grand Valley State University and Michigan State University.

=== Ferris State University ===
==== College of Pharmacy ====
Ferris State University's College of Pharmacy is located in the 25 Michigan NE RDV/Christman development. It consists of 26,000-square-feet of space on the building's seventh floor and houses classrooms and clinical equipment.

=== Grand Rapids Community College ===
==== Calkins Science Center ====
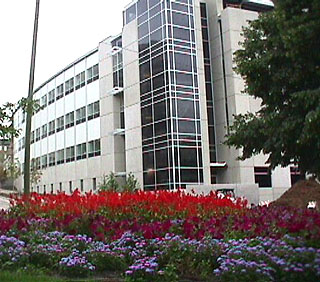
GRCC Calkins Science Center

The Grand Rapids Community College Calkins Science Center was opened in the winter semester of 2000. It was named after the 25 year president, Richard W. Calkins. It is located on Bostwick Avenue across Crescent Street, with Butterworth Hospital on its north side. It is a 150,000-square-foot (14,000 m^{2}) education building with a 150-seat auditorium. It contains several computer laboratories, biology laboratories, physical science laboratories, a cadaver room, a prehistoric rooftop garden, and a 1,700-square-foot (160 m^{2}) greenhouse.

=== Grand Valley State University ===
==== Cook-DeVos Center for Health Sciences ====
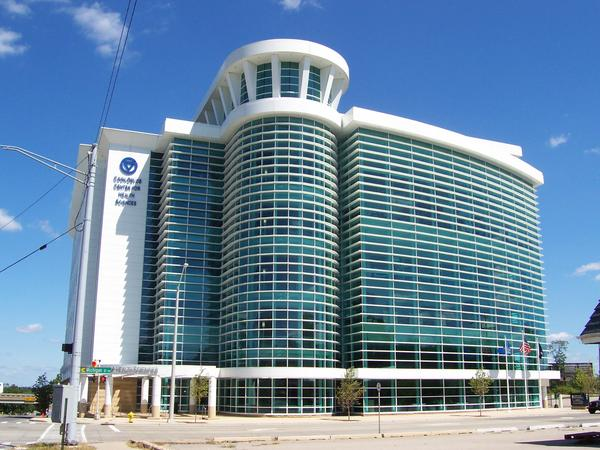
GVSU Cook-DeVos Center for Health Sciences

The GVSU Cook-DeVos Center for Health Sciences is a 273,000-square-foot (25,400 m^{2}) facility opened in 2003 by Grand Valley State University. The project cost was $32 million, and is located with Michigan Street on the south side and Lafayette on the west side. It currently has four specialized laboratories dealing with different rehab services. It also houses a portion of the GVSU library system in the Frey Foundation Learning Center. This portion of the system deals with medical fields.

The center also houses the 150 seat Hagar Auditorium, the 120 seat Steelcase lecture hall, and six conference rooms with 12 to 20 seats each. Also in the facility is the West Michigan Science & Technology Initiative, a GVSU project that is designed to aid medical business by providing lab space and allocates around 20,000 square feet (1,900 m^{2}) allocated for this purpose. It was founded in 2003 by GVSU, VAI, GRCC, the City of Grand Rapids, and the Right Place, a Grand Rapids-based strategic alliance.

==== Raleigh J. Finkelstein Hall ====
The Raleigh J. Finkelstein Hall is an extension of the GVSU's medical and nursing programs. The facility is the first Medical Mile development located north of Michigan Ave. across Interstate 196. The building houses classrooms, labs and offices for staff. The building opened in May 2018, with classes starting the following fall.

==== Daniel and Pamella DeVos Center for Interprofessional Health ====
The Daniel and Pamella DeVos Center for Interprofessional Health was opened on June 21, 2021, to students. It is a 5-story, 166,000 square foot facility that contains technology and instruction space for the 20-plus health science programs that GVSU offers. The 17 classrooms and 12 interactive labs will now allow students to engage in enhanced learning by being more engaged in the material. It also contains the Frey Foundation Library and Learning Commons as well as the Kirkoff College of Nursing.

=== Michigan State University ===
==== College of Human Medicine ====
Secchia Center

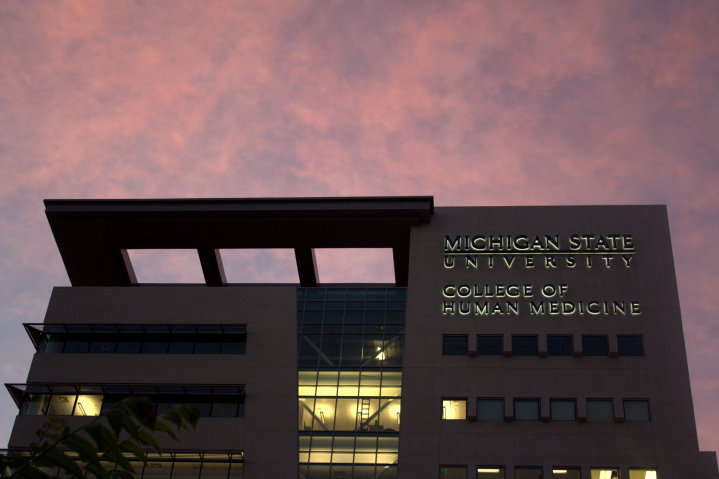
Michigan State University Secchia Center

The Michigan State University (MSU) College of Human Medicine Secchia Center houses the Grand Rapids portion of the MSU's M.D. medical school. Its purpose was to expand MSU CHM's class size from its traditional 106 students to 206 entering students per year in 2010; with 100 of those students spending all four years in Grand Rapids. Historically, first and second year students attended the East Lansing campus; the third and fourth year students then spread to six different urban areas in the state in order to complete their training.

Grand Rapids has been such a host for many years, and with the advent of the Medical Mile they were asked to expand the medical school in Grand Rapids. The center is home to 400 students a year. The project was ratified by the MSU Board of Trustees on January 18, 2007. It was funded by private dollars through a joint fundraising initiative by MSU and Grand Action, a nonprofit Grand Rapids based organization designed to revitalize and attract business to downtown Grand Rapids. A $10 million lead donation of the $90 million construction budget was given by Ambassador Peter F. Secchia.

The campus is a seven-story building atop a five-story parking garage. It is approximately 180,000 square feet (17,000 m^{2}) and is a part of the four-tower RDV/Christman Michigan Street development bounded by Interstate 196 (I-196) to the north, Michigan Street to the south and North Division to the west. It is skywalk-linked into Tower 25 of the Medical Mile, which is connected to the Van Andel Institute and the remainder of the Medical Mile.

Biomedical Research Center

In 2017, the biomedical research center was completed on the site of the former Grand Rapids Press headquarters. The building, which is six stories tall and has an area of 162,800-square-feet, will house biomedical researchers that were previously housed at the Van Andel Institute.

== Mid Towne Village ==
The Mid Towne Village is the first Planned Redevelopment District in the 2003 Grand Rapids passed zoning law. It is designed to be a mixed use facility and is at the northeast corner of Michigan Street and College Avenue. It has six buildings and a 15,000 square feet (1,400 m^{2}) Village Green Park in the center of the development. Key facilities in the project includes the Women's Health Center, Park Row Condominiums, an office building for the development along with three other buildings. Along with being the first in project of this type in the state it is also the second to receive Brownfield tax credits for a blighted neighborhood.

The Women's Health Center is a four-story 100,000-square-foot (9,300 m^{2}) facility designed to combine many of the women based services in Corewell Health Butterworth Hospital, University of Michigan Health - West and other Grand Rapids-based groups. Connected to the building is a five-story parking ramp providing 500 spaces. At the facility is a lower floor that includes an estimated 500 square feet (46 m^{2}) conference room. On the third floor is the University of Michigan Health - West's Heart & Vascular specialists. Cost of the facility is at $25 million. It is located at the northern end of the facility with the north face of the building looking over I-196. The east face looks over the parking ramp and into a neighborhood.

Building A of the facility is a three-story 60,000-square-foot (5,600 m^{2}) building. It currently has 46 parking spots in a garage underneath the building. The building is on the west side of the development and is just south of Women's Health Center. Its east side faces the park and its north side also has a view of I-196. A plaza is planned to be placed between it and the Health Center. The building has been planned to be a Medical use only facility.

Building C of the facility is a three-story 29,000-square-foot (2,700 m^{2}) building. It has eight parking spots with two in a residential style garage. Its north side faces the central park, the south side faces the offices of the complex. The east side will overlook the Midtown neighborhood. The west side will overlook a large parking lot and to College Ave.

The residential section of the complex is the Park Row Condos. It has a max of 34 units for purchase with a combined 40,000 square feet (3,700 m^{2}) of space. According to their site they can combine units together to create larger units than what they presently offer. They have four floors on the site and have on-site parking on the east side of the building. The building itself offers both two-story and one-story condos. The one story or flats are located on the first and second levels. The two-story condos are located on the third and fourth floors. This building replaces the 48 residential homes that were purchased and torn down to make way for the complex. The west side will face the Park, the north side will overlook the parking ramp and I-196, the east side will overlook the Midtown neighborhood and the south side will overlook several offices.

The final building of the complex is Building D. It is a three-story 25,000-square-foot (2,300 m^{2}) building. It is being planned for mixed use. It is set up to host seven suites and has no parking garage but has access to the parking on the complex site. Its north side faces a parking lot that will overlook Building B, the south side faces Michigan Street, the east side overlooks the complex offices, and the west side overlooks offices between it and College Avenue.

== Other developments ==
=== RDV/Christman Michigan Street Development ===
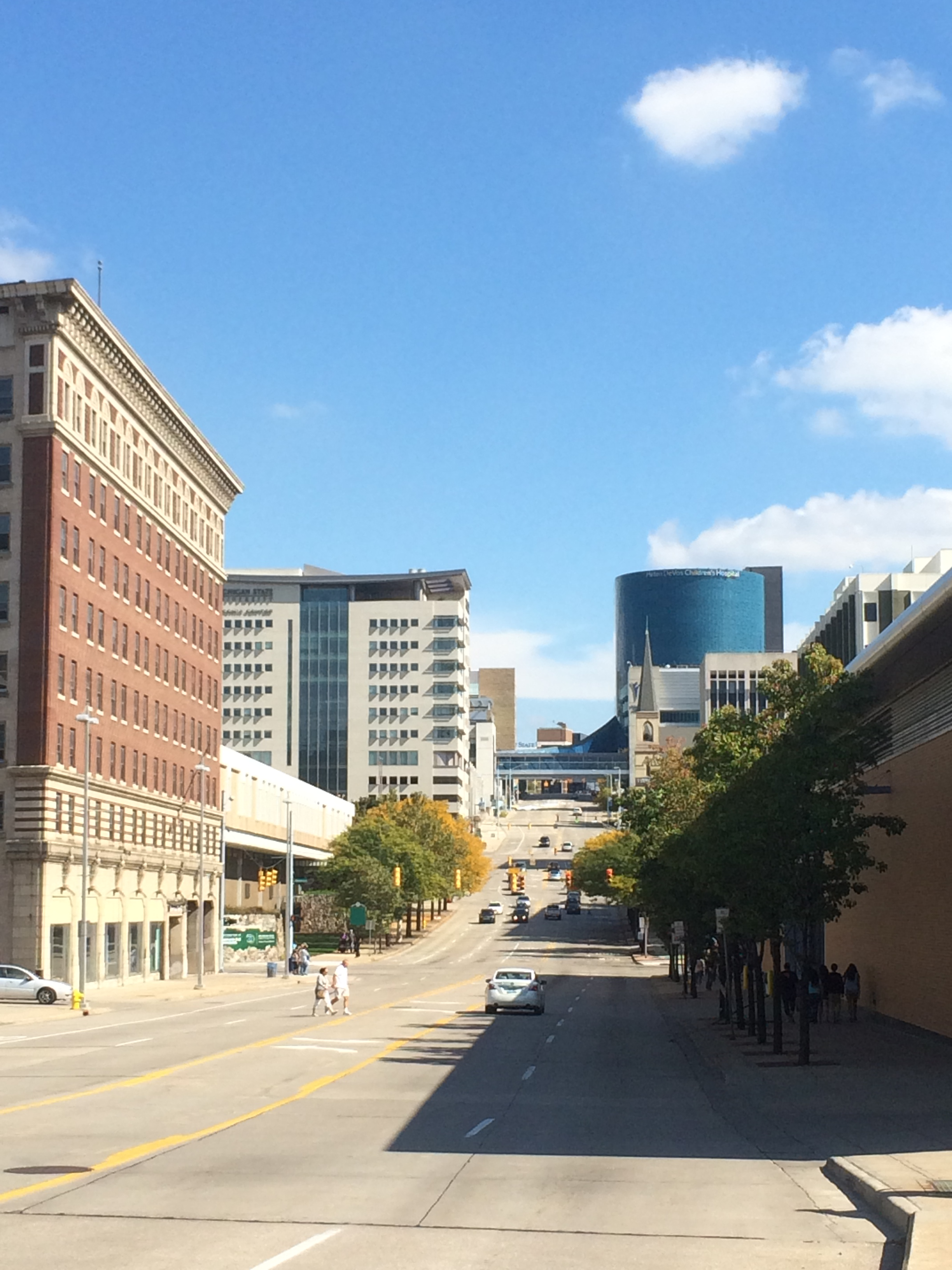
A view toward the Medical Mile on Michigan Street with the Secchia Center visible on the left and the Helen DeVos Children's Hospital on the right.

The RDV/Christman Michigan Street Development is an integrated series of mixed-use buildings constructed along the north side of Michigan Street spanning between Division Avenue to Coit Avenue. It was a $250 million project that is jointly owned by RDV Corp. and The Christman Company, collectively known as Michigan Street Development, LLC. Several properties were acquired by the partnership: a State of Michigan surface parking lot, the Towers Building, an aboveground parking structure, a private practice medical building, and a Burger King. All of these were razed in preparation for the new facilities. Numerous tax incentives allowed financing of the development to become finalized.

The design of the facility includes a four-story, 2,300 space underground parking structure with four buildings built on the top levels. The four buildings will have approximately 740,000 square feet (69,000 m^{2}) of space and created approximately two thousand new jobs.

The project is scheduled to be completed in two primary phases.

Phase I consisted of:

- Demolition of the Burger King, surface parking lots, aboveground parking structure, and medical office.
- Mass excavation and an earth retention system at the east and west thirds of the site.
- A parking structure below grade from Division Avenue to Bostwick Avenue and just east of Bostwick Avenue to Coit Avenue.
- Michigan Street Tunnel connecting the Butterworth Campus to the Helen DeVos Children's Hospital and the Lemmen-Holton Cancer Pavilion.
- Tower 25 - seven-story medical office building.
- A pedestrian bridge connecting the parking structure to the Van Andel Institute.
- Construction of the Lemmen-Holton Cancer Pavilion and the Michigan State University Secchia Center College of Human Medicine.

Phase II consisted of:

- Demolition of the Towers Building and surface parking lot.
- Mass excavation and earth retention at the center third of the development.
- Tower 35 - seven-story medical office building including lab space located at 35 Michigan Street NE.
- A pedestrian bridge connecting Tower 35 to the Butterworth Campus and the Helen DeVos Children's Hospital.
- A food court located between Tower 25 and Tower 35.
