= Michigan State University College of Osteopathic Medicine =

Osteopathic medical school of Michigan State University

- Type: Public medical school
- Established: 1969
- Parent institution: Michigan State University
- Budget: $104.05 million
- Dean: Joyce DeJong
- Faculty: 2000
- Students: 300 per class
- Location: East Lansing; Clinton Township; Detroit, Michigan, United States
- Campus: Suburban and Urban
- Tuition (2017-2018): $46,110 resident $65,325 non-resident
- Website: com.msu.edu

The Michigan State University College of Osteopathic Medicine (MSUCOM) is one of the two medical schools of Michigan State University in East Lansing, Michigan. The college grants the Doctor of Osteopathic Medicine (D.O.) degree, as well as a DO-PhD combined degree. The college operates two satellite campuses in Clinton Township and Detroit. The college is accredited by the American Osteopathic Association's Commission on Osteopathic College Accreditation (COCA) and by the Higher Learning Commission.

== History ==
Michigan State University College of Osteopathic Medicine (MSUCOM) was established during a period when the chartering of new osteopathic medical schools was uncommon. Osteopathic doctors across Michigan collaborated to spearhead the creation of this new medical school. In 1964, the Michigan Association of Osteopathic Physicians and Surgeons received a state charter and started to raise money for a new private osteopathic medical college. In 1969, the first class was admitted to the Michigan College of Osteopathic Medicine (MCOM) in Pontiac, Michigan, becoming the first osteopathic medical school to open since 1916.

That same year, the Michigan legislature passed P.A. 162, which stated that “A school of osteopathic medicine is established and shall be located as determined by the state board of education at an existing campus of a state university with an existing school or college of medicine." On September 19, 1969, Michigan State University accepted the legislative mandate and agreed to create a new osteopathic medical school on their campus, making it the first osteopathic medical school based at a public university. In 1971, MCOM was moved to East Lansing and was given its current name of MSUCOM. Myron S. Magen, D.O. was the first dean and served for more than two decades.

In the mid-2000s, MSUCOM expanded from its main campus in East Lansing to two satellite campuses in Detroit and Macomb. The expansion was approved by the MSU Board of Trustees in May 2007 and by the Commission on Osteopathic College Accreditation in September 2008. In July 2009, instruction began at these two expansion sites. In 2011, MSUCOM started a program for training Canadian students to become osteopathic physicians, accepting 25 Canadian students each year. In 2010, the partnership between MSU and Sparrow Hospital was strengthened. This agreement was meant to foster research, education, and clinical services, and it culminated in the creation of the Center for Innovation and Research in 2012. In December 2017, MSU and McLaren announced they were strengthening their partnership and that a new $450 million hospital would be built near MSU's East Lansing campus.

== Academics ==
The college offers the Doctor of Osteopathic Medicine (D.O.) degree, as well as dual degrees (DO-PhD and DO-MBA). Applicant selection is made from a competitive applicant pool and depends on many aspects of the applicant such as GPA, MCAT, maturity, community service and life experiences. Among admitted students, the average GPA is 3.5–3.7 and the average MCAT score is 506–508.

=== Medical curriculum ===
MSUCOM's curriculum consists of pre-clerkship years that run for seven semesters. The first portion consists of introductory basic science, including: anatomy, biochemistry, genetics, physiology, etc. During this time, students also learn physical examination, doctor-patient interactions, and the principles of osteopathic palpatory diagnosis and manipulative therapy. After learning the biological foundations, the curriculum shifts to a body system focus where the integumentary, neuro-musculoskeletal, hematopoietic, cardiovascular, respiratory, urinary, gastrointestinal, endocrine, and reproductive systems are detailed. Throughout the entire sequence, courses in Patient Care and Osteopathic Manipulative Medicine are incorporated.

After the first two years, the students are assigned a base hospital and begin their clerkship years where they rotate through family medicine, internal medicine, OBGYN, general surgery, psychiatry, etc.

=== DO-PhD program ===
MSUCOM's DO-PhD Physician Scientist Training Program, the first of its kind in the nation, was founded by Dr. Veronica Maher and Dr. Justin McCormick in 1979. The eight-year program is not organized in the traditional 2-4-2 MD-PhD arrangement, but starts with the first year of graduate coursework. This arrangement allows for more integration between the graduate research and medical school education. Most DO-PhD students complete PhDs through the BioMolecular Science program which includes: biochemistry, cell and molecular biology, genetics, microbiology, pharmacology & toxicology, and physiology. However, there are graduate students in neuroscience, epidemiology, anthropology, and sociology. The alumni of the program have entered many prestigious residency programs and most graduates find careers in medical colleges, universities, or major medical research centers.

In 2025, MSUCOM became the first ever DO-PhD program in the nation to receive the Medical Scientist Training Program (MSTP) designation, marking a milestone in osteopathic medical education and physician-scientist training.

== Pre-clerkship training sites ==
The College of Osteopathic Medicine conducts pre-clinical training at three sites: East Lansing, Detroit and Macomb. MSUCOM's primary campus is in East Lansing on the main Michigan State University campus. The Detroit satellite campus is situated on the campus of the Detroit Medical Center (DMC). The Macomb satellite campus, the most recent to be added, is located at Macomb University Center within Macomb Community College.

== Statewide campus system ==
Clinical training for the third- and fourth-year students occurs at hospitals throughout Michigan affiliated with the Statewide Campus System. Currently, there are nearly 30 hospital locations affiliated with MSUCOM. In 2017, MSUCOM's Statewide Campus System was named as one of the five regional assessment training centers by the Accreditation Council for Graduate Medical Education. MSUCOM was the only DO medical school included.

=== Base hospitals ===
- Beaumont Hospitals- Beaumont Hospital, Farmington Hills and Beaumont Hospital, Trenton, Southshore Campus
- Detroit Medical Center- Sinai-Grace Hospital and Huron Valley-Sinai Hospital
- Garden City Hospital
- Genesys Regional Medical Center
- Henry Ford Health System- Henry Ford Allegiance Health, Henry Ford Macomb Hospital, and Henry Ford Wyandotte Hospital
- Lakeland HealthCare
- McLaren Health Care Corporation- McLaren–Greater Lansing Hospital, McLaren Bay Region, McLaren Macomb, and McLaren Oakland
- Mercy Health Partners
- Metro Health Hospital- University of Michigan Health
- Munson Medical Center
- Sparrow Health System- Sparrow Hospital
- St. John Health Osteopathic Division
- St. Joseph Mercy Ann Arbor

Other SCS Affiliated groups include: Detroit Metro Urological Surgery Consortium, Hamilton Community Network, Hillsdale Community Health Center, Oakwood Healthcare System Dearborn, ProMedica Coldwater Regional Hospital, ProMedical Toledo Hospital, St. Joseph Mercy Livingston and Oakland, and St. Mary Mercy Hospital. Kirksville College of Osteopathic Medicine and Marian University College of Osteopathic Medicine are also affiliated with the SCS.

== Notable alumni ==
- Anne Brooks
- Reuben Henderson
- Larry Nassar
- Steven Pitt
- Barbara Ross-Lee, first African American woman to serve as dean of a U.S. osteopathic medical school
