= Corewell Health =

Non-profit healthcare system in Michigan, United States

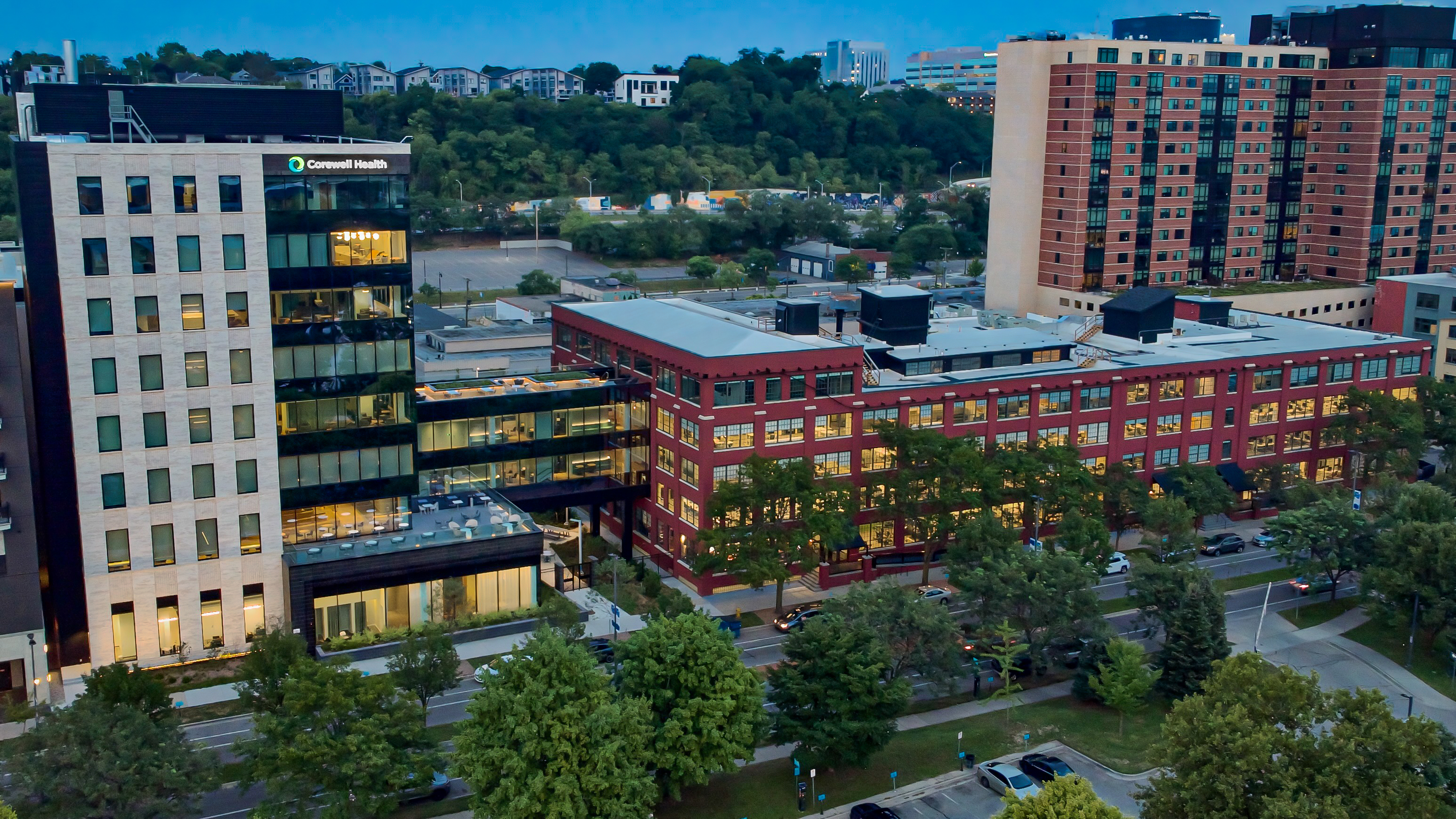
- Formerly: BHSH Health (2022)
- Type: Non-profit
- Industry: Healthcare
- Predecessor: Beaumont Health; Spectrum Health
- Founded: February 1, 2022; 4 years ago
- Headquarters: Grand Rapids, Michigan Southfield, Michigan, U.S.
- Number of locations: 22 hospitals (2025)
- Area served: Metro Detroit; Greater Grand Rapids; West Michigan
- Key people: Tina Freese Decker, CEO
- Revenue: 865,601,487 United States dollar (2021)
- Total assets: 3,764,596,745 United States dollar (2021)
- Website: corewellhealth.org

Corewell Health is a non-profit healthcare system in the U.S. state of Michigan. It was formed by the 2022 merger of Beaumont Health, located in Southfield, and Spectrum Health, headquartered in West Michigan. Corewell Health is currently the largest healthcare system in Michigan, based on its inpatient admissions and net patient revenue. The organization is headquartered in Grand Rapids and employs over 60,000 people.

== History ==
=== Spectrum Health ===
Spectrum Health formed in 1997 through the merger of Butterworth Health System and Blodgett Memorial Medical Center in the Grand Rapids area. The system expanded through further mergers and acquisitions, most recently merging with Lakeland Health in 2018. Prior to merging with Beaumont, Spectrum was the largest health care organization, and largest private employer, in West Michigan, operating 14 hospitals across the region.

=== Beaumont Health ===
Beaumont Health was formed with the opening of William Beaumont Hospital in Royal Oak, Michigan in 1955. The system expanded with the acquisition of Bon Secours Hospital in 2007, and mergers with Botsford Hospital and Oakwood Hospital in 2014. At the time of the merger, Beaumont operated 8 hospitals in the Detroit metropolitan area.

=== Merger and creation of Corewell Health ===
In June 2021, Beaumont announced plans to merge with Grand Rapids-based Spectrum Health. Following federal government approval, the two systems announced their merger would be effective February 1, 2022. The combined system was temporarily named BHSH Health, before its permanent name, Corewell Health, was adopted on October 11. Spectrum CEO Tina Freese Decker became CEO of the combined organization, and John Fox, the head of Beaumont Health, resigned on February 4, 2022.

== Locations and subsidiaries ==
=== Headquarters ===
Corewell Health is headquartered at 100 Corewell Dr NW, on the Grand Rapids Medical Mile; it maintains a large Metro Detroit-area administrative office in Beaumont Health's former headquarters in Southfield.

=== Hospitals ===
| Hospital | Location | Beds | Trauma center | Opened | Notes |
|---|---|---|---|---|---|
| Corewell Health William Beaumont University Hospital | Royal Oak | 1109 | Level I | 1955 | |
| Corewell Health Dearborn Hospital | Dearborn | 632 | Level II | 1953 | formerly Oakwood Hospital; merged with Beaumont in 2014 |
| Corewell Health Beaumont Troy Hospital | Troy/Sterling Heights | 520 | Level II | 1977 | complex straddles city/county border, connected by skybridge |
| Corewell Health Farmington Hills Hospital | Farmington Hills | 330 | Level II | 1965 | formerly Botsford General Hospital; acquired by Beaumont in 2014 |
| Corewell Health Grosse Pointe Hospital | Grosse Pointe | 280 | Level III | 1945 | formerly Bon Secours Hospital; acquired by Beaumont in 2007 |
| Corewell Health Trenton Hospital | Trenton | 193 | Level II | 1961 | formerly Oakwood Southshore Medical Center; merged with Beaumont in 2014 |
| Corewell Health Wayne Hospital | Wayne | 185 | Level III | 1957 | formerly (Oakwood) Annapolis Hospital; merged with Beaumont in 2014 |
| Corewell Health Taylor Hospital | Taylor | 180 | Level IV | 1977 | formerly Oakwood Heritage Hospital; merged with Beaumont in 2014 |
| Corewell Health Helen DeVos Children's Hospital | Grand Rapids | 241 | Level I Pediatric | 1970 | affiliated with Michigan State University |
| Corewell Health Butterworth Hospital | Grand Rapids | 852 | Level I | 1875 | |
| Corewell Health Blodgett Hospital | East Grand Rapids | 248 | Level III | 1914 | |
| Corewell Health Gerber Memorial Health Services | Fremont | 25 | Level IV | 1918 | merged with Spectrum in 2010 |
| Corewell Health Reed City Hospital | Reed City | 64 | Level IV | 1884 | merged with Spectrum in 2010 |
| Corewell Health United Hospital | Greenville | 88 | Level IV | 1915 | acquired by Spectrum in 2003 |
| Corewell Health Zeeland Community Hospital | Zeeland | 55 | Level III | 1921 | acquired by Spectrum in 2011 |
| Corewell Health Ludington Hospital | Ludington | 49 | Level IV | 1967 | formerly Memorial Medical Center; acquired by Spectrum in 2013 |
| Corewell Health Big Rapids Hospital | Big Rapids | 49 | Level IV | 1878 | formerly Mecosta County Medical Center; acquired by Spectrum in 2013 |
| Corewell Health Pennock Hospital | Hastings | 25 | Level IV | 1923 | acquired by Spectrum in 2015 |
| Corewell Health Lakeland Medical Center | Saint Joseph | 296 | Level III | 1899 | formerly part of Lakeland Health; merged with Spectrum in 2018 |
| Corewell Health Lakeland Niles Hospital | Niles | 89 | Level IV | 1899 | formerly part of Lakeland Health; merged with Spectrum in 2018 |
| Corewell Health Lakeland Watervliet Hospital | Watervliet | 49 | Level IV | 1899 | formerly part of Lakeland Health; merged with Spectrum in 2018 |

=== Insurance ===
Priority Health is a subsidiary health plan with one million members.

=== Pediatric care ===
Corewell Health Helen DeVos Children's Hospital (HDVCH) is a nationally ranked, freestanding, 241-bed, pediatric acute care children's hospital located in downtown Grand Rapids. It is affiliated with the Michigan State University College of Human Medicine and is a member of the Spectrum health system, the only children's hospital in the system. The hospital provides comprehensive pediatric specialties and subspecialties to infants, children, teens, and young adults aged 0–18 throughout Grand Rapids region and features an ACS verified level I pediatric trauma center. Its regional pediatric intensive-care unit and neonatal intensive care units serve the region. It is named for Helen DeVos, wife of Amway founder Richard DeVos, a major donor.

Beaumont Children's Hospital now Corewell Health Children's, was announced in 2009. Eighty-three sub-specialists, a 40-bed pediatric unit, eight-bed pediatric ICU and 64-bed NICU had been in place at Beaumont, Royal Oak since 2004. In 2008, Beaumont joined the National Association of Children's Hospitals and Related Institutions.

Facilities include a dedicated specialty inpatient pediatric unit at Beaumont, Royal Oak and inpatient units at the Beaumont hospitals in Troy, Dearborn and Farmington Hills for children with less serious conditions. Specialty pediatric services including emergency care, hematology-oncology, gastroenterology, endocrinology, cardiology, neurology, newborn and pediatric intensive care, pediatric surgery and craniofacial surgery are available at outpatient locations throughout Metro Detroit.

Corewell Health Children's cares for more than 100,000 pediatric emergency and after-hours visits every year and 17,000 babies are delivered each year as well.

Corewell Health Children's is a member of the Children's Hospital Association and the only Southeast Michigan affiliate of Children's Miracle Network Hospitals.

=== Other facilities ===
The Lemmen-Holton Cancer Pavilion is an outpatient cancer center located in the Grand Rapids Medical Mile. It was developed to bring all cancer research and patient service delivery under one roof in the Spectrum Health System.

== Controversy ==
=== Dobbs v. Jackson ===
On June 24, 2022, hours after the Supreme Court's decision in Dobbs v. Jackson Women's Health Organization, Corewell Health announced that most abortion services would no longer be offered at the system's facilities, despite court orders which kept the procedure legal in Michigan. Following public pressure, including calls for a boycott of the system, Corewell reverted to its previous policy, providing abortion when deemed medically necessary.
