= Beaumont Health =

Defunct healthcare system in Michigan, United States

- Formerly: Beaumont Health System (until 2014)
- Type: Non-profit
- Industry: Healthcare
- Founded: 1955
- Defunct: February 1, 2022; 4 years ago
- Fate: Merged with Spectrum Health
- Successor: Corewell Health
- Headquarters: Southfield, Michigan, U.S.
- Number of locations: 8 hospitals (2022)
- Area served: Metro Detroit
- Website: Archived official website at the Wayback Machine (archive index)

Beaumont Health was a nonprofit healthcare system in the Detroit metropolitan area in the U.S. state of Michigan. In 2022, it merged with Grand Rapids-based Spectrum Health to form Corewell Health.

At the time of the merger, Beaumont was Southeast Michigan's largest health care system based on inpatient admissions and net patient revenue. It consisted of eight hospitals with 3,375 beds, 155 outpatient sites, nearly 5,000 physicians, and more than 33,000 employees. Beaumont was headquartered in Southfield, Michigan; its flagship facility was Beaumont Hospital, Royal Oak (now Corewell Health William Beaumont University Hospital), located in nearby Royal Oak.

== History ==
=== Origins ===
The system originally traced its roots to three independent hospital networks: William Beaumont Hospital, Botsford Hospital, and Oakwood Hospital.

Groundbreaking began in 1953 for "Oakland Hospital," but due to a delivery mix-up and to further distinguish itself from nearby Oakwood Hospital, the name was changed to William Beaumont Hospital. The hospital officially opened on January 24, 1955, with 238 beds in Royal Oak, Michigan. The hospital was named for William Beaumont, a U.S. Army surgeon who became known as the "Father of Gastric Physiology" for his research on human digestion on Mackinac Island, Michigan.

Botsford General Hospital opened in 1965 with 200 beds in Farmington Hills, Michigan. It was founded by Dr. Allen Zieger as an expansion of the Zieger Clinic Hospital he had opened in Detroit in 1944.

Oakwood Hospital opened on January 5, 1953, in Dearborn, Michigan, on land donated by Henry Ford II and the Ford Motor Company. The decision to build a "voluntary" hospital was initially controversial, as Dearborn mayor Orville L. Hubbard had supported a competing proposal for a municipal facility.

=== 2014 merger ===
In March 2014, the Beaumont Health System, along with Botsford Health Care and Oakwood Healthcare, signed a letter of intent to merge their operations. The $3.8 billion merger closed on September 2, 2014, and the combined organization adopted the shortened name Beaumont Health.

=== Failed merger attempt with Advocate Aurora ===
In 2020, Beaumont and Advocate Aurora, a 28-hospital system in Illinois and Wisconsin, announced plans to merge into a combined company worth $17 billion. These plans were mutually called off in October 2020 following intense pushback from physicians, lawmakers, staff, and donors who expressed deep concerns over patient care, as well as a "toxic culture" of fear and intimidation under then-CEO John Fox. Following the collapse of the merger, leading Beaumont physicians sent formal letters to the board calling for the termination of Fox and other executives, citing massive layoffs alongside controversial multi-million dollar executive bonuses.

=== Merger with Spectrum Health ===
In June 2021, Beaumont Health announced a new plan to merge with Grand Rapids-based Spectrum Health. Following federal regulatory approval, the merger became effective on February 1, 2022. The new statewide system was temporarily called BHSH Health, operating with dual headquarters in Grand Rapids and Southfield. John Fox resigned upon the completion of the merger, and Spectrum CEO Tina Freese Decker took over leadership of the combined system. In October 2022, the system was permanently rebranded as Corewell Health.

== Locations ==
Prior to the 2022 merger, Beaumont Health operated eight hospitals across Metro Detroit. As part of the transition to Corewell Health, these facilities were rebranded:

- Corewell Health William Beaumont University Hospital (formerly Beaumont Hospital, Royal Oak) – A 1,109-bed Level 1 Trauma Center.
- Corewell Health Dearborn Hospital (formerly Oakwood Hospital / Beaumont Hospital, Dearborn) – A 632-bed Level 2 Trauma Center.
- Corewell Health Beaumont Troy Hospital (formerly Beaumont Hospital, Troy) – A 520-bed facility built in 1977.
- Corewell Health Farmington Hills Hospital (formerly Botsford Hospital / Beaumont Hospital, Farmington Hills) – A 330-bed Level 2 Trauma Center.
- Corewell Health Grosse Pointe Hospital (formerly Bon Secours / Beaumont Hospital, Grosse Pointe) – A 280-bed facility originally acquired from Bon Secours Health System in 2007.
- Corewell Health Trenton Hospital (formerly Oakwood Southshore / Beaumont Hospital, Trenton) – A 193-bed facility in Trenton.
- Corewell Health Wayne Hospital (formerly Oakwood Annapolis / Beaumont Hospital, Wayne) – A 185-bed facility in Wayne.
- Corewell Health Taylor Hospital (formerly Oakwood Heritage / Beaumont Hospital, Taylor) – A 180-bed facility in Taylor.

=== Pediatric care ===
Beaumont Children's Hospital was announced in 2009 at the Royal Oak campus, eventually joining the Children's Hospital Association and becoming the only Southeast Michigan affiliate of the Children's Miracle Network Hospitals. The network maintained dedicated pediatric inpatient units at the Royal Oak, Troy, Dearborn, and Farmington Hills campuses. Following the 2022 merger, the pediatric division was integrated into Corewell Health Children's.

=== Headquarters ===
In 2017, Beaumont Health purchased the 31-acre First Center Office Plaza in Southfield to consolidate and centralize its administrative offices. Following the merger with Spectrum Health, this location was maintained as the Metro Detroit administrative office for Corewell Health.

== Medical school and teaching hospital ==
In 2010, Oakland University and William Beaumont Hospital partnered to open an allopathic medical school called the Oakland University William Beaumont School of Medicine (OUWB). The school was granted full accreditation by the Liaison Committee on Medical Education and graduated its first class in 2015.

Beaumont served as a teaching hospital through its primary partnership with OUWB, as well as through affiliations with the Michigan State University College of Osteopathic Medicine, Michigan State University College of Human Medicine, and Wayne State University School of Medicine.

== See also ==
- William Beaumont
- Beaumont (disambiguation)
