= Van Andel Institute =

US non-profit organisation

Coordinates: 42.9695°N 85.667°W

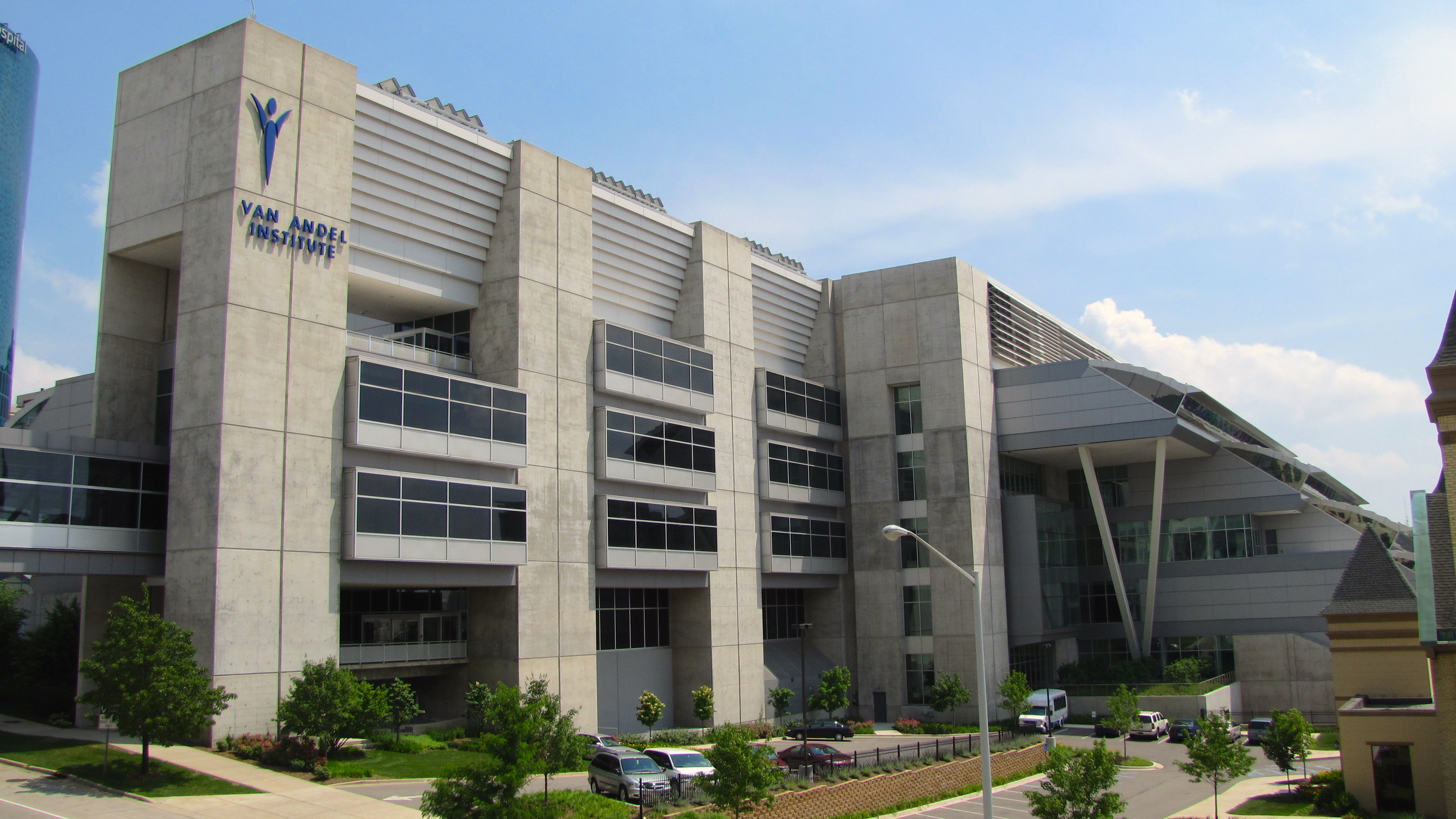

- Formation: 1996
- Headquarters: Grand Rapids, Michigan
- CEO: David Van Andel
- Staff: >500
- Website: www.vai.org

Van Andel Institute (VAI) is a 501(c)(3) nonprofit biomedical research and science education organization in Grand Rapids, Michigan. VAI was founded by Jay and Betty Van Andel in 1996.

The institute's research focuses on cancer epigenetics and Parkinson's disease. Its educational efforts support teacher development and science education from early elementary through the doctoral level.

David Van Andel, son of Jay and Betty, has been CEO and chairman since 1996.

== Research ==
Van Andel Research Institute (VARI) scientists study the epigenetic, genetic, cellular and structural basis of cancer and Parkinson's disease as well as osteoarthritis, neurofibromatosis type 1, Alzheimer's disease, prion diseases, Ewing sarcoma and other conditions.

As of 2023, Van Andel Institute has more than 500 employees.

=== Center for Epigenetics ===
The Center for Epigenetics was established in 2014 and is led by Peter Jones. Scientists in the Center focus on identifying epigenetic mechanisms in health and disease states, and translating their findings into new treatments for cancer and neurodegenerative diseases.

=== Center for Neurodegenerative Science ===
The Center for Neurodegenerative Science was established in 2012. The center primarily investigates the underlying causes of Parkinson's disease.

=== Center for Cancer and Cell Biology ===
The Center for Cancer and Cell Biology is led by Bart Williams. It is the largest center at the institute.

=== Core Technologies and Services ===
The institute's laboratories are supported by a Core Technologies and Services group that comprises eight shared scientific services:

- Bioinformatics and biostatistics
- Confocal microscopy and quantitative imaging
- Cryo-electron microscopy
- Flow cytometry
- Genomics
- Optical Imaging
- Pathology and biorepository
- Transgenics and vivarium

In 2017, the institute established the David Van Andel Advanced Cryo-Electron Microscopy Suite as part of an expansion of its structural biology program. The $10 million investment included the installation of an FEI Titan Krios cryo-electron microscope, a Talos Arctica cryo-electron microscope and a Tecnai Spirit G2 BioTWIN screening microscope.

The institute also houses a College of American Pathologists-accredited Biorepository that contains more than one million formalin-fixed paraffin-embedded blocks.

=== Large-Scale Collaborations ===
Grand River Aseptic Manufacturing (GRAM) was founded in 2010 by Van Andel Institute and Grand Valley State University. Much of GRAM's initial funding was through angel investment that generated $5 million in 2010 and another $2 million in 2013.

In September 2014, the institute partnered with The Cure Parkinson's Trust on its Linked Clinical Trials initiative, which investigates repurposed drugs for use as disease-modifying treatments for Parkinson's. LCT has supported trials in ambroxol, exenatide, simvastatin, liraglutide, and others.

In October, the institute announced a partnership with Stand Up To Cancer to form the VARI–SU2C Epigenetics Dream Team, a multi-institutional collaboration to translate potential epigenetic treatments for cancer into clinical trials. The team is led by Jones and Stephen Baylin, M.D co-head of the Cancer Biology Program at Johns Hopkins University's Sidney Kimmel Comprehensive Cancer Center. It has launched six clinical trials in cancers, including metastatic colorectal cancer, myelodysplastic syndrome, acute myeloid leukemia, non-small cell lung cancer, and bladder cancer.

=== Research Leadership ===
In 1999, George Vande Woude, joined VARI as its founding research director. He stepped down from his post as research director in 2009 to devote more time to his research.

Vande Woude was succeeded by Jeffrey Trent, who had a dual role as research director at VARI and at Translational Genomics Research Institute (TGen) in Phoenix, Arizona. He left VARI in 2012 to lead TGen full-time.

In 2013, Peter Jones, was named as the institute's chief scientific officer. Jones also served as president of VAI and its Graduate School from 2024 to 2026.

== Education ==
Van Andel Education Institute (VAEI), founded in 1996, provides kindergarten to 12th-grade inquiry-based science education programs for students, and sustained professional development programs and instructional tools for educators.

=== Leadership ===
Gordon Van Wylen was appointed director of VAEI in 1996. Before workthis, Van Wylen was elected dean of the Engineering Department at the University of Michigan in 1965 and later served as president of Hope College in Holland, Michigan, from 1972 to 1987.

Gordon Van Harn was appointed director of VAEI in 2001 and worked in this capacity until 2009. Van Harn was also an emeritus provost and professor of biology at Calvin College in Grand Rapids, Michigan.

Marcia Bishop was appointed associate director of VAEI in 2004. She was in this role until 2011 when Jim Nicolette was appointed to the position of associate director.

Steven J. Triezenberg was director of VAEI between 2009 and 2015. Triezenberg previously was a faculty member of the Department of Biochemistry and Molecular Biology at Michigan State University for more than 18 years.

Terra Tarango was appointed director of VAEI in 2016. Tarango previously held the position of president of Staff Development for Educators (SDE), a professional development company in New Hampshire, from 2012 to 2016. Tarango also designed print and digital curriculum for kindergarten through 12th-grade students at Houghton Mifflin Harcourt.

=== Student programs ===
VAEI's student programs for kindergarten through 12th grade students include:

- Summer Camps
- Field Experience
- High School Journal Club
- Out of-School Time Cohort
- Science on Saturday

=== Teacher professional development ===
VAEI designs and provides professional development workshops and instructional tools for kindergarten through twelfth grade teachers. Materials include downloadable lesson plans, interactive student journals, and classroom resources.

=== Science education tools ===
In 2015, VAEI launched NexGen Inquiry, a web-based instructional tool designed to help students and teachers meet Next Generation Science Standards (NGSS) as well as other state benchmarks, and provides teachers with the tools they need to incorporate inquiry-based learning in their classrooms.

=== Van Andel Institute Graduate School ===
Van Andel Institute Graduate School offers an accredited program in cell and molecular genetics that is designed to foster problem-based thinking and research leadership. VAIGS also offers an M.D./Ph.D. program in partnership with Michigan State University College of Human Medicine and Western Michigan University Homer Stryker M.D. Medical School.

Van Andel Institute Graduate School was founded in 2005 under the leadership of then-VAEI director Gordon Van Harn, . The first graduating class was in 2012. VAIGS was accredited by the HLC on November 12, 2013. Steven J. Triezenberg, was named the founding dean in 2006.

== Purple Community ==
Purple Community, founded in 2009, is Van Andel Institute's grassroots community awareness and fundraising program. Purple Community helps individuals and organizations create fundraising events to support biomedical research and science education at Van Andel Institute.

== Architecture ==
Van Andel Institute is located on the Grand Rapids Medical Mile. Its 400,000 square foot building was designed by architect Rafael Viñoly and was constructed in two phases; the first phase was completed in 2000 and second phase opened in December 2009. It includes 27,500 square feet of laboratory space, 71,000 square feet of laboratory support space, a demonstration lab, an auditorium and on-site cafeteria. The institute's Phase II was awarded Leadership in Energy & Environmental Design (LEED) Platinum status by the United States Green Building Council in 2011.

The lobby features a 14-foot tall glass sculpture called Life created by Dale Chihuly designed to be an artistic representation of a DNA double helix.
