= Oakland/Troy Airport =

Airport in Michigan, United States

Coordinates: 42°32′35″N 083°10′40″W

- IATA: none; ICAO: KVLL; FAA LID: VLL

Summary
- Airport type: Public
- Owner: Oakland County
- Serves: Troy, Michigan
- Elevation AMSL: 727.2 ft / 221.6 m

Map
- Location of airport in Michigan VLL (the United States)

Runways
Direction	Length		Surface
Direction	ft	m	Surface
10/28	3,549	1,081.7	Asphalt

Statistics (2021)
- Aircraft operations: 30,000
- Source: Federal Aviation Administration

Oakland/Troy Airport (ICAO: KVLL, FAA LID: VLL) is a county-owned public-use airport located two miles (3.2 km) east of the central business district of Troy, a city in Oakland County, Michigan, United States. It is included in the Federal Aviation Administration (FAA) National Plan of Integrated Airport Systems for 2017–2021, in which it is categorized as a regional reliever airport facility.

The Oakland/Troy Airport is considered the county's "executive" airport. Business travelers and tourists using private, corporate and charter aircraft benefit from the airport's convenient proximity to business, recreation and entertainment facilities. It is located between Maple Road and 14 Mile Road and Coolidge Highway and Crooks Road.

Although most U.S. airports use the same three-letter location identifier for the FAA and IATA, Oakland/Troy Airport is assigned VLL by the FAA but has no designation from the IATA (which assigned VLL to Valladolid, Spain). Oakland/Troy was formerly designated 7D2 but changed March 17, 2005 after an automated weather station was installed at the field.

== History ==
Runway 9/27 was changed to Runway 10/28 in October 2021 after resurfacing the runway and changing taxiway signs. This maintenance was done along with runway resurfacing at Oakland County International Airport (KPTK) and Oakland/Southwest Airport (Y47).

== Facilities and aircraft ==
Oakland/Troy Airport covers an area of 119 acres (48 ha) which contains one runway designated 10/28 with a 3,550 ft × 60 ft (1,082 m × 18 m) asphalt pavement. For the 12-month period ending December 31, 2006, the airport had 32,466 general aviation aircraft operations, an average of 88 per day.

For the 12-month period ending December 31, 2021, the airport had 30,000 aircraft operations per year, or 82 per day. It consisted completely of general aviation. For the same time period, there were 104 aircraft based on the field: 92 single-engine and 5 multi-engine airplanes, 6 helicopters, and 1 ultralight.

The airport has two FBOs that offer fuel, hangars, WiFi, and more.

== See also ==
- List of airports in Michigan
