= Helen DeVos Children's Hospital =

Coordinates: 42.97051°N 85.66581°W

- Corewell Health

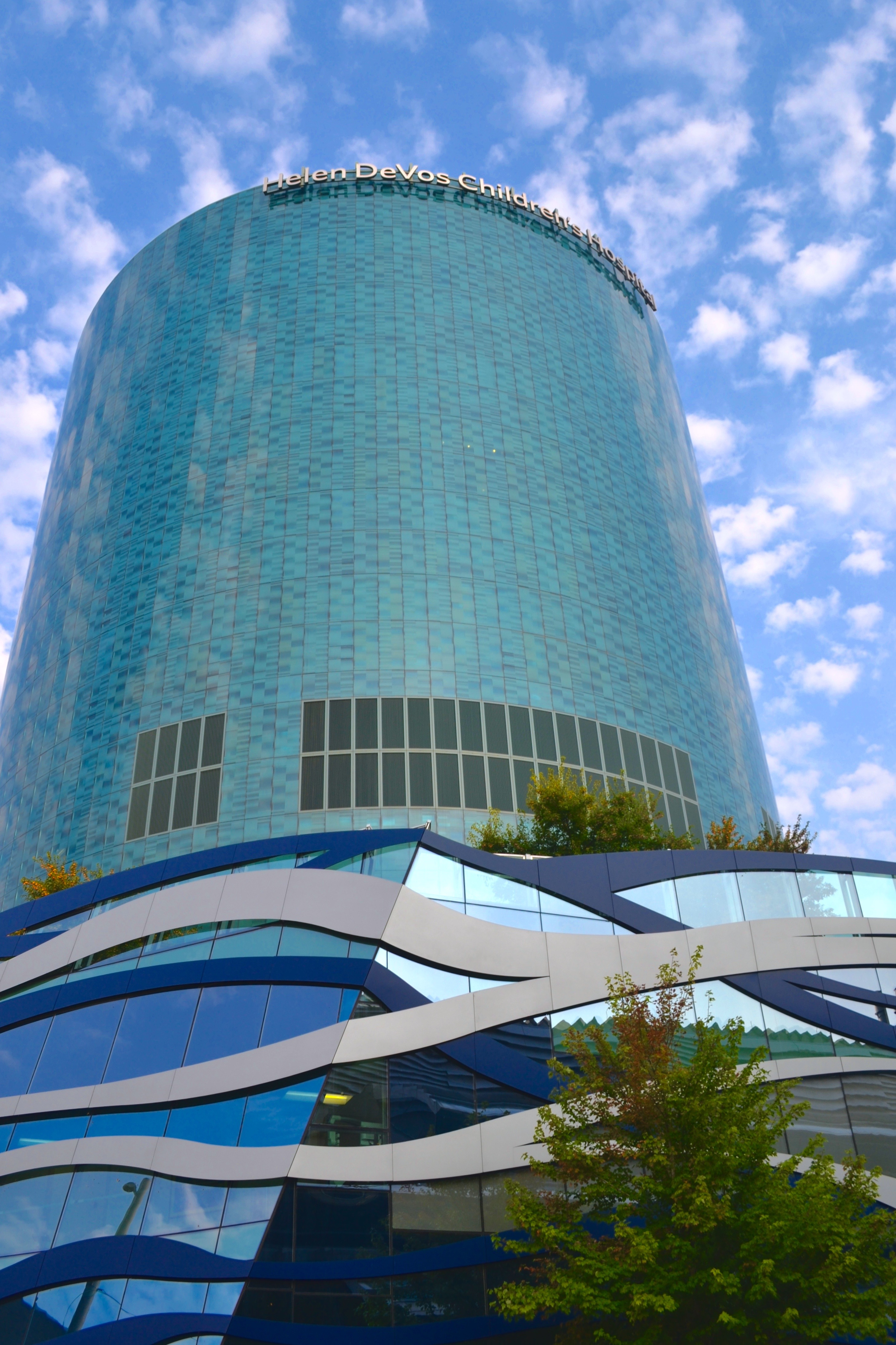

Geography
- Location: Grand Rapids, Michigan, United States

Organization
- Type: Specialist
- Affiliated university: Michigan State University College of Human Medicine

Services
- Emergency department: Level I Pediatric Trauma Center
- Beds: 241
- Speciality: Children's hospital

History
- Founded: 1970

Links
- Website: Helen DeVos Children's Hospital website
- Lists: Hospitals in Michigan

The Helen DeVos Children's Hospital (HDCH) is a nationally ranked, freestanding, 241-bed, pediatric acute care children's hospital located in downtown Grand Rapids, Michigan. It is affiliated with the Michigan State University College of Human Medicine and is the only children's hospital in the Corewell Health system. The hospital provides comprehensive pediatric specialties and subspecialties to infants, children, teens, and young adults aged 0–18 throughout Grand Rapids region and features an ACS verified level I pediatric trauma center. Its regional pediatric intensive-care unit and neonatal intensive care units serve the region. It is named for Helen DeVos, wife of Amway founder Richard DeVos, a major donor.

== Overview ==
The hospital offers 40 pediatric specialty services. The hospital received Magnet Recognition status by the American Nurses Credentialing Center 2009. The hematology, oncology and bone marrow transplant program received the American Society of Clinical Oncology Award for the program's work to improve cancer care through clinical research, one of eight hospitals in the U.S. to receive this recognition.

The hospital built a 14-story children's hospital at 100 Michigan St. NE in downtown Grand Rapids. The building opened January 11, 2011.

In 2008, the hospital implemented a collaborative program with Priority Health called the Children's Healthcare Access Program that provides children enrolled in Medicaid more access to primary care.

== Recognition ==
The hospital ranks in 3 pediatric specialties nationally, and ranks as the second best children's hospital in Michigan on the 2025-2026 U.S. News & World Report rankings.

2025-2026 U.S. News & World Report Rankings for Helen DeVos Children's Hospital
Specialty	Rank (In the U.S.)
Pediatric Cancer	#44
Pediatric Neurology & Neurosurgery	#49
Pediatric & Adolescent Behavioral Health	Top 50

== See also ==
- List of children's hospitals in the United States
- Grand Rapids Medical Mile
