= Corewell Health Butterworth Hospital =

- Corewell Health

Geography
- Location: 100 Michigan St. NE, Grand Rapids, Michigan, United States
- Coordinates: 42.96978°N 85.66432°W

Organization
- Type: Teaching
- Affiliated university: Michigan State University College of Human Medicine

Services
- Emergency department: Level I trauma center

Helipads
- Helipad: (IATA: MI97)

History
- Founded: 1875

Links
- Lists: Hospitals in Michigan

Corewell Health Butterworth Hospital is a Level I Trauma Center hospital with 876 licensed beds in the Grand Rapids Medical Mile in downtown Grand Rapids, Michigan. The hospital is a teaching affiliate of the Michigan State University College of Human Medicine.Butterworth Hospital houses the Fred and Lena Meijer Heart Center, a 10-story, 332,000 square foot tower constructed in 2004.

== History ==
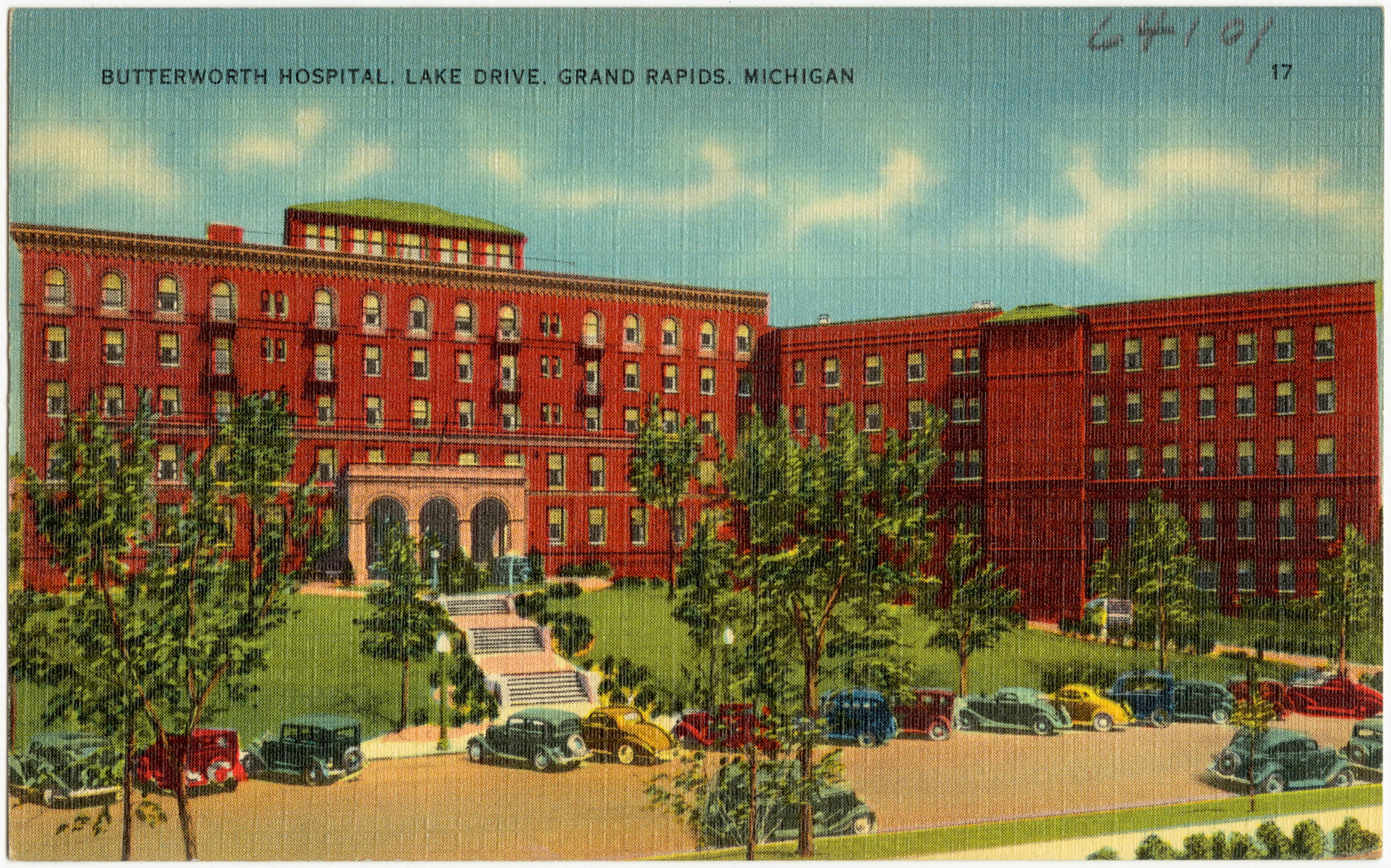
Butterworth Hospital in the 1930s or 40s

Founded in 1875 as St. Mark's Home and Hospital, begun by parishioners of St. Mark's Episcopal Church, the current location was donated by Mr. Butterworth in 1888. St. Mark’s Home and Hospital was constructed in 1889, and opened in 1890. In 1902, the hospital separated from St. Mark's Church, and became an independent corporation.

Butterworth Hospital Construction, circa 1924

In 1924, a new 200-bed hospital was erected at the site, with an additional west wing constructed in 1951 to add 155 beds. Additional construction added a new main entrance in 1953, the south tower in 1960, and a large 6-story tower in 1976 with an emergency department, outpatient surgery services, and diagnostic radiology departments, among others.
