= Michigan State University College of Human Medicine =

Medical school of Michigan State University

Coordinates: 42.7226°N 84.464764°W

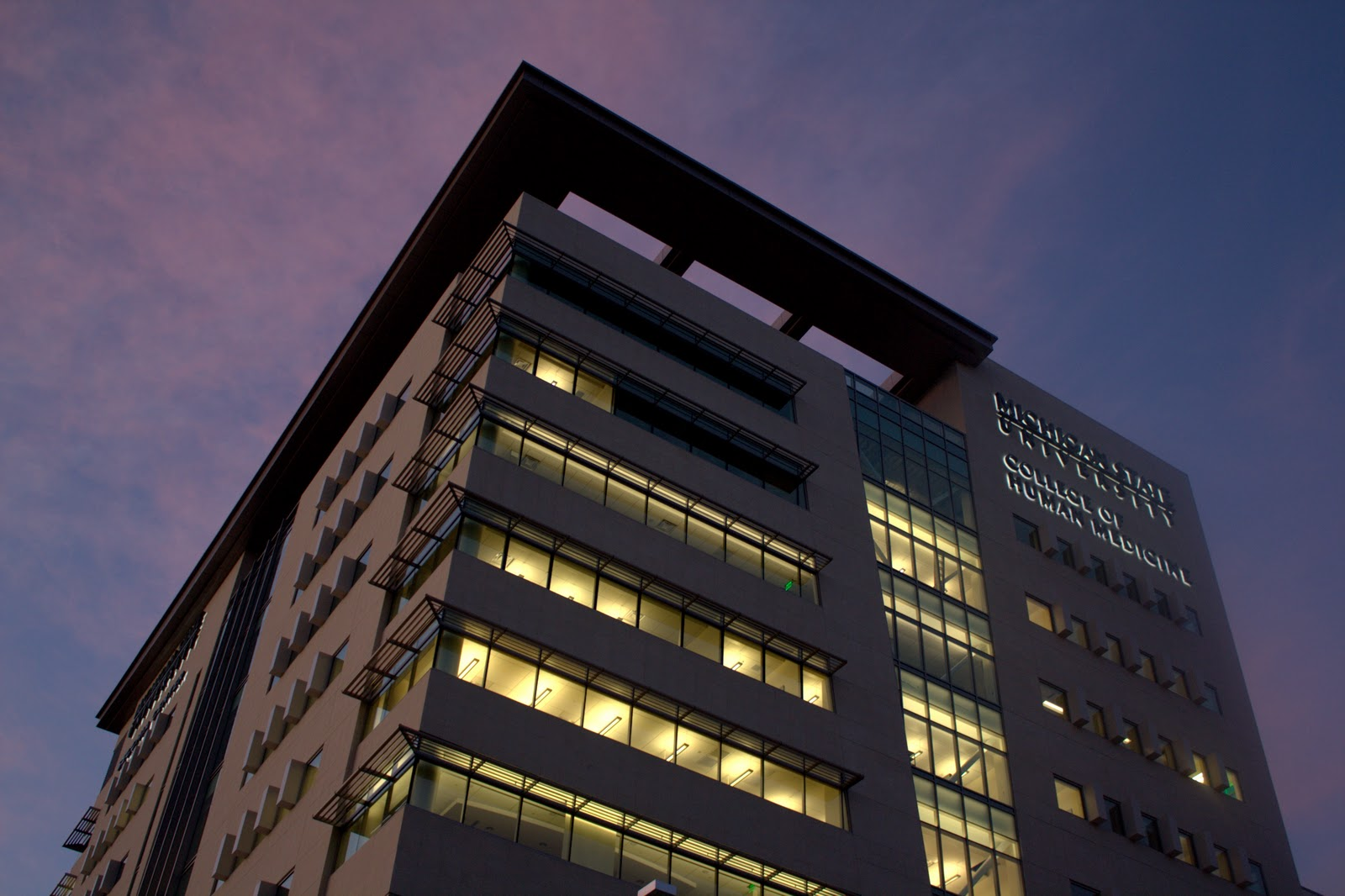
- Motto: Serving the People
- Type: Public research university
- Established: 1964
- Dean: Supratik Rayamajhi, MD (interim)
- Academic staff: 600 full-time, 3300 adjunct
- Students: 800
- Location: East Lansing, Michigan, U.S.
- Campus: East Lansing, Grand Rapids
- Tuition (2020-2021): $48,378 resident $89,712 non-resident
- Website: chm.msu.edu

The Michigan State University College of Human Medicine (MSUCHM) is an academic division of Michigan State University (MSU) that grants the Doctor of Medicine (MD) degree, emphasizing patient-centered care and a biopsychosocial approach to caring for patients. Required courses at the college reinforce the importance of ethics and professionalism in medicine. In 2013, U.S. News & World Report ranked the college 46th for primary care. The college was also ranked for family medicine and rural medicine. More than 4,000 M.D.s have graduated from the college. Pre-clinical campuses are located on MSU's main campus in East Lansing, Michigan and in downtown Grand Rapids, Michigan, while the clinical rotations are at eight community campuses located throughout Michigan. MSUCHM offers the Rural Physician Program or Rural Community Health Program to earn the Leadership in Rural Medicine Certificate. The college also offers the Leadership in Community and Public Health Certificate, based on the Flint campus.

== History ==
From 1959–61, several reports demonstrated the need for a third medical school in Michigan focused on serving the state's population through direct involvement in community health care. In 1961, the Michigan State Board of Trustees decided to begin a two-year medical program at Michigan State University. Several grants aided the development of the program. Michigan State University appointed Andrew D. Hunt Jr., MD as the first dean of the College of Human Medicine in 1964.

The College of Human Medicine began training pre-clinical medical students in the fall of 1966 (26 students) and the fall of 1967 (23 students). After their preclinical training, these students needed to transfer to other medical schools to finish the final two years of their medical school education. In 1967, the College of Human Medicine was approved for a four-year degree program. The first MDs graduated in 1972.

In 2006, Marsha D. Rappley, M.D., became the first graduate of the College of Human Medicine to become dean of the medical school. In August 2007, enrollment increased from 106 first-year students to 156 students. In October 2007, MSU Board of Trustees voted to approve a $90 million project to build a new educational facility in downtown Grand Rapids. The construction was supported entirely with private funds, including $55 million from Spectrum Health and $5 million from Richard DeVos. MSU alumnus and philanthropist Peter F. Secchia is the namesake for the facility, following his $10 million donation to the university.

In September 2010, the college's headquarters moved from Fee Hall in East Lansing to the newly built Secchia Center in Grand Rapids. The college's administration maintain offices at both the East Lansing and Grand Rapids campuses.

In June 2015, MSU announced plans to build an $88 million research complex, Grand Rapids Research Center, near the Secchia Center in downtown Grand Rapids. The center opened in September 2017. In later 2015, Marsha Rappley stepped down as Dean of the College, and Senior Associate Dean for Academic Affairs Aron Sousa, M.D., became interim dean.

On October 1, 2016, the College of Human Medicine welcomed its new dean, Norman Beauchamp Jr., MD, the second graduate of the college to serve as dean.

In October 2019, Dr. Norman Beauchamp was promoted as the Executive Vice President of Health Sciences at MSU. Dr. Aron Sousa once again reprised his role as interim dean and was appointed as dean in April 2022.

In October 2025, Dr. Aron Sousa stepped down as Dean of the college, and Associate Dean for Clinical Affairs and Professor of Medicine Dr. Supratik Rayamajhi, MD became interim dean.

== Clinical training ==
Clinical practice (undergraduate medical education during the third and fourth years of medical school), graduate medical education, and research takes place across eight campuses located throughout Michigan: Grand Rapids, Flint, Lansing, Upper Peninsula Region, Midland Region, Traverse City, Southeast Michigan, and Detroit. The college previously had a Saginaw campus, but that was transitioned to the Central Michigan University College of Medicine in 2011. The campus in Kalamazoo, was transitioned to Western Michigan University in 2014.

Students are assigned to one of the campuses for their third and fourth years, rather than a specific hospital. The campus administration then places students at hospitals within the campus. After submitting a request, clinical students are also able to take a clerkship at a campus other than their assigned campus. Students may fulfill clerkship electives outside of the MSU system only in their fourth year.

=== Grand Rapids ===
The Grand Rapids campus serves as both a pre-clinical and clinical campus. Approximately 140 third- and fourth-year medical students are at this campus.

- Corewell Health Butterworth Hospital
- Helen DeVos Children's Hospital
- Trinity Health Hospital
- Pine Rest Mental Health Hospital

=== Flint ===
Students at the Flint campus have the opportunity to participate in the Leadership in Community and Public Health Certificate program. Approximately 80 third- and fourth-year medical students are at this campus.

- Ascension Genesys Hospital
- Hurley Medical Center
- McLaren Regional Medical Center

=== Lansing ===
The Lansing campus serves as both a pre-clinical and clnical campus. Approximately 26 third- and fourth-year medical students are at this campus.

- McLaren–Greater Lansing Hospital
- University of Michigan-Sparrow Hospital

=== Upper Peninsula Region ===
The Upper Peninsula campus is based in Marquette. Students at this campus have the opportunity to participate in the Rural Physician Program to earn the Leadership in Rural Medicine Certificate. Approximately 20 third- and fourth-year medical students are at this campus.

- Marquette General Hospital

=== Midland Region ===
The Midland Regional Campus is based in Midland, but students at this campus also have clerkships in hospitals in Alma, Clare, and Gladwin. This campus was formerly known as the Saginaw campus, but the headquarters moved to Midland as of July 2011. Students at this campus have the opportunity to participate in the Rural Community Health Program to earn the Leadership in Rural Medicine Certificate. Approximately 20 third- and fourth-year medical students are at this campus.

- MyMichigan Medical Center Midland
- MyMichigan Medical Center Gladwin
- MyMichigan Medical Center Clare
- MyMichigan Medical Center Alma

=== Traverse City ===
The Traverse City Campus is based in Traverse City, but students at campus complete their clerkships throughout Northern Michigan hospitals including Alpena, Cadillac, Charlevoix, Grayling and Ludington. Students at this campus have the opportunity to participate in the Rural Community Health Program to earn the Leadership in Rural Medicine Certificate. Approximately 24 third- and fourth-year medical students are at this campus.

- Munson Medical Center
- MyMichigan Medical Center Alpena
- Corewell Health Ludington

=== Southeast Michigan ===
Approximately 40 third- and fourth-year medical students are at this campus.

- Henry Ford Providence Southfield Hospital
- Henry Ford Providence Novi Hospital

=== Detroit ===
Established in 2022, the Detroit campus is the college's newest campus. Approximately 26 third- and fourth-year medical students are at this campus.

- Henry Ford Hospital
- Henry Ford West Bloomfield Hospital

== Graduate medical education ==
=== Residencies ===
The College of Human Medicine sponsors or is affiliated with 59 graduate medical education programs and 872 residents, including the following programs. In the Lansing area, MSU collaborates with area hospitals through Graduate Medical Education, Inc. In the Grand Rapids area, MSU programs are affiliated with the Grand Rapids Medical Education Partners. MSU/Flint Area Medical Education partners with MSU CHM in the Flint area.

Specialty	Location	Sponsor(s)	Reference
Emergency Medicine	Lansing	MSU CHM, MSU COM, Sparrow Hospital	
Emergency Medicine	Grand Rapids	MSU CHM, GRMEP	
Family Medicine	Lansing	Sparrow Hospital, MSU CHM	
Family Medicine	Grand Rapids	GRMEP, MSU CHM	
Family Medicine	Marquette	Marquette General Hospital, MSU CHM, Lake Erie COM	
Family Medicine	Midland	MidMichigan Medical Center-Midland, MSU CHM	
Family Medicine	Traverse City	Munson Medical Center, MSU CHM, MSU COM	
General Surgery	Lansing, Flint	MSU CHM	
General Surgery	Grand Rapids	GRMEP, MSU CHM	
Internal Medicine	Lansing	MSU CHM, Sparrow Hospital	
Internal Medicine	Grand Rapids	GRMEP, MSU CHM	
Obstetrics and Gynecology	Lansing	Sparrow Hospital, MSU CHM, MSU COM	
Obstetrics and Gynecology	Grand Rapids	GRMEP, MSU CHM	
Orthopaedic Surgery	Grand Rapids	GRMEP, MSU CHM	
Pediatrics	Lansing	MSU CHM, Sparrow Hospital	
Pediatrics	Grand Rapids	GRMEP, MSU CHM	
Physical Medicine and Rehabilitation	Lansing	MSU CHM, MSU COM, GMEI, Sparrow Hospital	
Plastic Surgery	Grand Rapids	GRMEP, MSU CHM	
Psychiatry	Lansing	MSU CHM, MSU COM	
Diagnostic Radiology	Flint	MSU CHM, MSU FAME	
Diagnostic Radiology	Grand Rapids	MSU CHM, GRMEP	
Vascular Surgery	Grand Rapids	GRMEP, MSU CHM	

=== Fellowships ===
Affiliated fellowship programs include:

- Cardiology
- Child and adolescent psychiatry
- Endocrinology
- Geriatrics
- Hematology/oncology
- Infectious disease
- Interventional cardiology
- Neonatology
- Surgical Critical Care

== Notable alumni ==
- Mona Hanna-Attisha - pediatrician, public health advocate and Flint Water Crisis whistleblower
- Richard E. Holmes - among the first African-Americans to attend Mississippi State University
- John A. McDougall - vegan advocate and nutrition expert
- Nicholas Perricone - dermatologist and author
- Stuart Sprague, nephrologist and Clinical Professor of Medicine at the Pritzker School of Medicine
- Ulana Suprun - former acting Minister of Healthcare of Ukraine
