= Rodger Raderman =

American media and technology entrepreneur

Rodger Raderman (born August 22, 1968, in Los Angeles, California) is an American media and technology entrepreneur. As of 2006, he was co-founder, Chief Marketing and Product Officer of Veeker, co-founder and chairman of Obscura Digital, and Founder of IFILM.

== Notable achievements ==
Raderman's first company, IFILM, founded in October 1998, was the first to use the Internet to deliver user-generated video content (short films) and premiere video content (music videos, movie trailers, viral videos) to a broad consumer audience.

Raderman's second company, Obscura Digital, founded in July 2000, was the first to introduce immersive video projection technologies to Fortune 500 companies’ event-based marketing efforts.

== Education ==
A native of California, with Russian origins, Raderman received a B.A. from the University of California, Los Angeles, with double majors in Communication Studies and Psychology. He was awarded a M.A. in Systematic and Philosophical Theology from the Graduate Theological Union at the University of California, Berkeley. His Master's thesis, entitled “Dreams and Liberation” was a curious exploration into the role the subconscious mind plays in helping individuals and societies discover and socialize ethical and metaphysical certainty.

== Career ==
After completing his master's degree, Raderman relocated to New York, and began working for Silicon Alley-based Marinex Multimedia. There, he helped produce one of the Web's first "webisodics", then known as a "Cybersoap", called "The East Village," along with an online entertainment magazine called "The Biz" and a CD-ROM magazine called "Trouble & Attitude."

From Marinex, Raderman joined Saatchi & Saatchi's interactive marketing division, Darwin Digital, where, as Creative Director and then managing director, he worked on interactive accounts for clients including Time Warner, General Mills, GeoCities, Allied Domec, New Zealand Telecom, The New Zealand Rugby Union, and HP.

He left Saatchi to found IFILM.

=== IFILM ===
Raderman founded IFILM in October 1998, and was the company's first Chairman/CEO. In April 1999, he was joined by co-founder and SVP Business Development Luke McDonough. In March 2000, Kevin Wendle, IFILM's original angel investor, became CEO and was made a co-founder as well.

=== Obscura Digital ===
Raderman co-founded Obscura Digital in July 2000 with Travis Threlkel, who, with co-CEO Chris Lejeune, operates the company.

Obscura Digital is an advanced HD video R&D and production facility focused on developing high-impact, immersive, and giant-scale display systems and content.

Haworth partnered with Obscura Digital to create Bluescape, a wall touchscreen.

Obscura collaborated with Tesla Motors and the Oceanic Preservation Society to design a custom Tesla Model S for the 2015 documentary film Racing Extinction. The vehicle had a projection system that was used to project images of endangered species onto public buildings to educate the public about the Holocene extinction event

=== Veeker ===
Raderman co-founded Veeker in September 2005 with entertainment industry veteran Alex Kelly, business development leader Marcus Yoder, and mobile industry expert Raj Singh.
