= Criticism of Skydance Corporation =

Paramount Skydance (previously ViacomCBS) is an American multinational entertainment conglomerate that was the subject of criticisms and controversies about its products and services. Criticism of Paramount Skydance has included the former Viacom Inc.'s announced plans of looking into splitting the company into two publicly traded companies. The company was not only dealing with a stagnating stock price, but also the rivalry between Leslie Moonves and Tom Freston, longtime heads of MTV Networks. In addition, the company was facing issues after MTV was banned from producing any more Super Bowl halftime shows after the Super Bowl XXXVIII halftime show controversy in 2004.

== Copyright complaints against YouTube ==
In February 2007, Viacom sent upwards of 100,000 DMCA takedown notices to the video-sharing site YouTube. Of the 100,000 notices, approximately 60–70 non-infringing videos were removed under the auspices of copyright infringement.

On March 13, 2007, Viacom filed a US$1 billion legal claim (Viacom International Inc. v. YouTube, Inc.) against Google and YouTube alleging massive copyright infringement, alleging that users frequently uploaded copyrighted material to YouTube — enough to cause a hit in revenue for Viacom and a gain in advertisement revenue for YouTube.

The complaint contended that almost 160,000 unauthorized clips of Viacom's programming were made available on YouTube and that these clips had collectively been viewed more than 1.5 billion times.

In July 2008, the case generated controversy when District Judge Louis Stanton ruled that YouTube was required to hand over data detailing the viewing habits of every user who had ever watched videos on the site.

Judge Stanton rejected Viacom's request for YouTube to hand over the source code of its search engine system, saying that the code was a trade secret.

Google and Viacom later agreed to allow Google to anonymize all the data before handing it over to Viacom.

On June 23, 2010, Judge Stanton ruled in Google's favor in a motion for summary judgment, holding that Google was protected by provisions of the Digital Millennium Copyright Act, notwithstanding evidence of intentional copyright infringement. Viacom announced its intention to appeal the ruling.

== CBS Entertainment Group ==
=== CBS News ===
Throughout the years, CBS News has been accused by conservative activists have of perpetuating a liberal bias in its news coverage. The Media Research Center has been especially critical about the coverage of liberal topics by CBS.

=== BET Networks ===
==== BET ====
Public Enemy rapper Chuck D, journalist George Curry, writer Keith Boykin, comic book creator Christopher Priest, filmmaker Spike Lee, Syracuse University professor of finance Boyce Watkins and cartoonist Aaron McGruder (who, in addition to numerous critical references throughout his series, The Boondocks, made a particular episode criticizing the channel), all have protested BET's programming and actions. As a result, BET heavily censors suggestive content from the videos that it airs, often with entire verses and scenes removed from certain rap videos. Furthermore, scholars within the black community maintain that BET perpetuates and justifies racism by affecting the interpersonal beliefs others may generalize out black people, and also by affecting the psyche of its young viewers through its bombardment of negative images of black people.

The New York Times reported that the Reverend Delman L. Coates and his organization Enough is Enough led protests every weekend outside the residences of BET executives against what they claim are negative stereotypes of black people perpetuated by BET music videos. Enough is Enough backed an April 2008 report titled The Rap on Rap by the Parents Television Council that claimed that BET rap programming, which they believed contained gratuitous sexual, violent, and profane content, was targeting children and teens. BET announced in March 2010 that Gordon would return to the network to host "a variety of news programs and specials."

In a 2010 interview, BET co-founder Sheila Johnson explained she herself is "ashamed" of what the network has become. "I don't watch it. I suggest to my kids that they don't watch it," she said. "When we started BET, it was going to be the Ebony magazine on television. We had public affairs programming. We had news... I had a show called Teen Summit, we had a large variety of programming, but the problem is that then the video revolution started up... And then something started happening, and I didn't like it at all. And I remember during those days we would sit up and watch these videos and decide which ones were going on and which ones were not. We got a lot of backlash from recording artists... and we had to start showing them. I didn't like the way women were being portrayed in these videos."

== MTV Entertainment Group ==
MTV Networks channels have been cited as suffering from channel drift. Music Television (as MTV was originally known) was originally a channel devoted to popular music videos upon its launch in 1981, but began adding entertainment and reality programs geared toward a young adult audience in the 1990s, beginning a progression toward its current focus of reality and scripted programming targeted primarily at teenagers and young adults. (The music videos transitioned to MTV2, then to MTV Hits, the current-day NickMusic.) Video Hits One likewise began as an outlet for adult contemporary music before transitioning to an urban pop culture channel as VH1; Country Music Television drifted to southern culture and general rerun programming as CMT; and The Nashville Network, perhaps the most dramatic, drifted to a male-heavy program lineup now known as Spike.

=== MTV ===
The channel has been a target of criticism by diverse groups about programming choices, social issues, political correctness, sensitivity, censorship, and a perceived negative social influence on young people. Portions of the content of MTV's programs and productions have come under controversy in the general news media and among social groups that have taken offense.

During MTV's first few years on the air, very few black artists were included in rotation on the channel. Those who were in MTV's rotation included Eddy Grant, Tina Turner, Donna Summer, Musical Youth, Herbie Hancock, Grace Jones, and Prince. The very first non-white act played on MTV in the U.S. was UK band The Specials, which featured an integrated line-up of white and black musicians and vocalists. The Specials' video "Rat Race" was played as the 58th video on the station's first day of broadcasting.

MTV rejected other black artists' videos, such as Rick James' "Super Freak", because they did not fit the channel's carefully selected AOR format at the time. The exclusion enraged James; he publicly advocated the addition of more black artists' videos on the channel. Rock legend David Bowie also questioned MTV's lack of black artists during an on-air interview with VJ Mark Goodman in 1983. MTV's original head of talent and acquisition, Carolyn B. Baker, who was black, had questioned why the definition of music had to be so narrow, as had a few others outside the network. "The party line at MTV was that we weren't playing black music because of the 'research'," said Baker years later. "But the research was based on ignorance... we were young, we were cutting edge. We didn't have to be on the cutting edge of racism." Nevertheless, it was Baker who had personally rejected Rick James' video for Super Freak "because there were half-naked women in it, and it was a piece of c--p. As a black woman, I did not want that representing my people as the first black video on MTV."

The network's director of music programming Buzz Brindle told an interviewer in 2006, "MTV was originally designed to be a rock music channel. It was difficult for MTV to find African American artists whose music fit the channel's format that leaned toward rock at the outset." Writers Craig Marks and Rob Tannenbaum noted that the channel "aired videos by plenty of white artists who didn't play rock." Andrew Goodwin later wrote, "[MTV] denied racism, on the grounds that it merely followed the rules of the rock business (which were, nonetheless, the consequence of a long history of racism)." MTV senior executive vice president Les Garland complained decades later, "The worst thing was that "racism" b------t... there were hardly any videos being made by black artists. Record companies weren't funding them. They never got charged with racism."

Before 1983, Michael Jackson also struggled to receive airtime on MTV. To resolve the struggle and finally "break the color barrier", the president of CBS Records at the time, Walter Yetnikoff, denounced MTV in a strong, profane statement, threatening to take away MTV's ability to play any of the record label's music videos. However, Les Garland, then acquisitions head, said he decided to air Jackson's "Billie Jean" video without pressure from CBS. This was contradicted by CBS head of Business Affairs David Benjamin in Vanity Fair.

According to The Austin Chronicle, Jackson's video for the song "Billie Jean" was "the video that broke the color barrier, even though the channel itself was responsible for erecting that barrier in the first place." But change was not immediate. "Billie Jean" was not added to MTV's "medium rotation" playlist (two to three airings per day) until after it had already reached #1 on the Billboard Hot 100 chart. A month later, it was bumped up into "heavy rotation", one week before the MTV debut of Jackson's "Beat It" video. Both videos were played several times a day for the next two months; by early summer, the channel had ceased playing both songs. But the impact was permanent. When Jackson's elaborate video for "Thriller" was released late in the year, which raised the ambition bar for what a video could be, the network's support for it was total; subsequently more pop and R & B videos were played on MTV.

Eventually, videos from the emerging genre of rap and hip hop would also begin to enter rotation on MTV. A majority of the rap artists appearing on MTV in the mid-1980s, such as Run-DMC, The Fat Boys, Whodini, L.L. Cool J and the Beastie Boys, were from the East Coast.

Video director Don Letts has a different view of the timeline, saying, "People often say "Billie Jean" was the first black music video on MTV. "Pass the Dutchie" was first. Because they were little and spoke in funny British accents, Musical Youth were deemed as non-threatening, and therefore non-black."

In 1983, Rolling Stone's Steven Levy wrote, "MTV's greatest achievement has been to coax rock & roll into the video arena where you can't distinguish between entertainment and the sales pitch." The Dead Kennedys released a song in 1985 titled "MTV, Get Off The Air".

MTV has edited a number of music videos to remove references to drugs, sex, violence, weapons, racism, homophobia, or advertising. Many music videos aired on the channel were censored, moved to late-night rotation, or banned entirely from the channel.

In the 1980s, parent-media watchdog groups such as the Parents Music Resource Center criticized MTV over certain music videos that were claimed to have explicit imagery of satanism. MTV developed a strict policy on refusal to air videos that may depict devil worship or anti-religious themes. This policy led MTV to ban music videos such as "Jesus Christ Pose" by Soundgarden in 1991 and "Megalomaniac" by Incubus in 2004.

==== Since the 2000s ====
Although MTV reached its 30th year of broadcasting in 2011, the channel itself passed over this milestone in favor of its current programming schedule. The channel instead aired its 30th anniversary celebrations on its sister networks MTV2 and VH1 Classic. Nathaniel Brown, senior vice president of communications for MTV, confirmed that there were no plans for an on-air MTV celebration similar to the channel's 20th anniversary. Brown explained, "MTV as a brand doesn't age with our viewers. We are really focused on our current viewers, and our feeling was that our anniversary wasn't something that would be meaningful to them, many of whom weren't even alive in 1981."

Despite targeted efforts to play certain types of music videos in limited rotation, MTV greatly reduced its overall rotation of music videos by the mid-2000s. While music videos were featured on MTV up to eight hours per day in 2000, the year 2008 saw an average of just three hours of music videos per day on MTV. The rise of the Internet as a convenient outlet for the promotion and viewing of music videos signaled this reduction.

As the decade progressed, MTV continued to play some music videos instead of relegating them exclusively to its sister channels, but around this time, the channel began to air music videos only in the early morning hours or in a condensed form on Total Request Live. As a result of these programming changes, Justin Timberlake challenged MTV to "play more damn videos!" while giving an acceptance speech at the 2007 Video Music Awards.

Despite the challenge from Timberlake, MTV continued to decrease its total rotation time for music videos in 2007, and the channel eliminated its long-running special tags for music videos such as "Buzzworthy" (for under-represented artists), "Breakthrough" (for visually stunning videos), and "Spankin' New" (for brand new videos). Additionally, the historic Kabel typeface, which MTV displayed at the beginning and end of all music videos since 1981, was phased out in favor of larger text and less information about the video's record label and director. The classic font can still be seen in "prechyroned" versions of old videos on sister network VH1 Classic, which had their title information recorded onto the same tape as the video itself.

Prior to its finale in 2008, MTV's main source of music videos was Total Request Live, airing four times per week, featuring short clips of music videos along with VJs and guests. MTV was experimenting at the time with new ideas for music programs to replace the purpose of TRL but with a new format.

In the summer of 2008, MTV premiered new music video programming blocks called FNMTV and a weekly special event called FNMTV Premieres, hosted from Los Angeles by Pete Wentz of the band Fall Out Boy, which was designed to premiere new music videos and have viewers provide instantaneous feedback.

The FNMTV Premieres event ended before the 2008 Video Music Awards in September. With the exception of a holiday themed episode in December 2008 and an unrelated Spring Break special in March 2009 with the same title, FNMTV Premieres never returned to the channel's regular program schedule, leaving MTV without any music video programs hosted by VJs for the first time in its history.

Shortly after Michael Jackson died on June 25, 2009, the channel aired several hours of Jackson's music videos, accompanied by live news specials featuring reactions from MTV personalities and other celebrities. The temporary shift in MTV's programming culminated the following week with the channel's live coverage of Jackson's memorial service. MTV aired similar one-hour live specials with music videos and news updates following the death of Whitney Houston on February 11, 2012, and the death of Adam Yauch of the Beastie Boys on May 4, 2012.

In 2007, MTV aired the reality show A Shot at Love with Tila Tequila, chronicling MySpace sensation Tila Tequila's journey to find a companion. Her bisexuality played into the series – both male and female contestants were vying for love – and was the subject of criticism. It was "...the #2 show..." airing on MTV at that time, behind The Hills. A spin-off series from A Shot at Love, titled That's Amoré!, followed a similar pursuit from previous A Shot at Love contestant Domenico Nesci.

In late 2009, MTV shifted its focus back to Real World-style reality programming with the premiere of Jersey Shore, a program that brought high ratings to the channel and also caused controversy due to some of its content.

With backlash towards what some consider too much superficial content on the network, a recent New York Times article also stated the intention of MTV to shift its focus towards more socially conscious media, which the article labels "MTV for the Obama era." Shows in that vein included T.I.'s Road to Redemption and Fonzworth Bentley's finishing school show From G's to Gents.

The channel also began showing presidential campaign commercials for the first time during the 2008 U.S. presidential election. This has led to criticism from the right, with Jonah Goldberg opening that "MTV serves as the Democrats' main youth outreach program."

=== Comedy Central ===
Comedy Central has been a frequent target of criticism from the conservative group Parents Television Council (PTC), which accuses them of bigotry and blasphemy. PTC has used their criticisms against Comedy Central for their support of the Family and Consumer Choice Act of 2007, which would allow U.S. cable TV subscribers to choose which channels they subscribe to, and to persuade advertisers to stop advertising on the channel. The channel has also received criticism from certain parents for airing advertisements for "Girls Gone Wild". The channel also airs the least cut version of the popular film Not Another Teen Movie, as well as uncut versions of films such as Coming to America, Dogma and Jay and Silent Bob Strike Back.

On November 5, 2007, an open letter was written by VideoSift to protest publicly the blocking of Comedy Central's embedded video content for non-American viewers.

On April 21, 2010, Comedy Central censored the South Park episode "201" in response to a death threat issued by users of a radical Muslim website over the episode's planned depiction of the Islamic prophet Muhammad, which led several newspaper columnists to condemn the network's actions as tantamount to abetting terrorism. Since then, as a result, neither "201" nor the episode that preceded it have been aired.

In 2025, the South Park creators Matt Stone and Trey Parker called out Paramount for the Skydance merger.

In response, the premiere of Season 27 of South Park was delayed to July 27, 2025.

=== Paramount Network ===
The name change to "Spike TV" was supposed to be official on June 16, 2003. However, on June 13, film director Spike Lee won a New York Supreme Court injunction preventing the name change. Lee claimed that because of his well-known popularity in Hollywood, viewers would therefore assume that he was associated with the new channel. Lee stated in court papers that: "The media description of this change of name, as well as comments made to me and my wife, confirmed what was obvious—that Spike TV referred to Spike Lee."

The channel had planned an official launch of its new name at a star-studded, televised party at the Playboy Mansion in mid-June. But due to Lee's injunction, the special—titled Party With Spike—had to be heavily edited and the impact of the event was considerably muted. During the lawsuit, even the name "TNN" was significantly scaled back, as logos and voice-overs referred to the channel only as "The First Network for Men".

Spike Jones Jr., son of comic musician Spike Jones, became a party of the lawsuit as part of Viacom's defense to protect the rights to his father's name. The suit was settled on July 8, 2003, and TNN was allowed to call itself Spike TV. In announcing the settlement, Lee admitted that he did not believe that the channel intentionally tried to trade on his name.

The name change became official on August 11, 2003.

In September 2005, all WWE programs departed Viacom networks after a new program agreement was made with USA Network. WWE Raw moved back to USA, while WWE Sunday Night Heat and WWE Velocity moved to WWE.com due to neglect by MTV and Spike to promote or schedule the shows on acceptable terms to WWE. On October 1, 2005, wrestling promotion Total Nonstop Action Wrestling (TNA) began airing its weekly program TNA Impact! in the Saturday night time slot formerly occupied by WWE Velocity. In WWE's last Raw broadcast on the channel, Viacom chose to censor and prevent mention of the USA move in Spike's last airing of Raw by anyone on the show, an effort which eventually proved futile when a "next week on USA" mention was not removed in time.

On October 15, 2005, Viacom acquired iFilm.com, which was initially launched in 1997. After acquiring the website for $49 million, it was eventually re-branded to Spike.com and provided hosting of user-uploaded videos; this failed to gain any traction and it eventually became a general network information and video portal.

YouTube was also launched in 2005, which later suffered a class action lawsuit reported to be over $1 billion. Spike.com's managing division claims that they only host videos they approve after they are submitted. YouTube Partner user Mike Mozart pointed out videos on Spike.com/iFilm that were uploaded from YouTube onto Spike.com, without permission as their descriptions are criticizing the video itself. He also pointed out that YouTube embeds hosted on Spike.com did not link back to YouTube, and any sort of video hyperlinking was forcibly disabled, contradicting YouTube's Terms of Use.

=== VH1 ===
VH1 endured criticism for the short-lived Music Behind Bars, which mainly focuses on musicians in custody. Critics have claimed prisoners, mainly those convicted of murder, should not be entitled to any exposure, especially nationally.

== Nickelodeon Networks ==
=== Nickelodeon ===
The channel as a whole has begun to receive negative reputations and controversies from the late 2000s to the early 2020s; since 2006, it has frequently burned off various Nicktoons that are not considered to have ratings on par with the more successful animated series SpongeBob SquarePants. Following the box-office success of the first film in 2004, various allegedly low-rated Nicktoons would often be pushed to the sister channel and be outright cancelled after the last few episodes.

The channel also frequently burned off various preschool shows that are not considered to have ratings on par with the more successful acquired series PAW Patrol. Since 2013, various allegedly low-rated preschool shows (both original and acquired) would often be pushed from the Nick Jr. block to the Nick Jr. Channel and be outright cancelled after the last few episodes.

As of late-2022, live-action-focused spinoff TeenNick became fully dedicated to reruns of Henry Danger and The Loud House. Similarly, as of mid-2024, animation-focused spinoff Nicktoons became fully dedicated to reruns of SpongeBob SquarePants, promoted as "Non-Stop SpongeBob. All Day. Every Day."

==== SpongeBob SquarePants ====
Nickelodeon programs have encountered significant controversies for some time. Several episodes of SpongeBob SquarePants have been the subject of controversy or entirely removed from the schedule. The Parents Television Council (PTC) and other sources believed that "Sailor Mouth" was an implicit attempt to promote and satirize the use of profanity among children, but reports cited otherwise. Richard Huff of the New York Daily News criticized the report for misinterpreting the episode over its intended satire. "SpongeBob's Last Stand" drew criticism from conservatives, who argued over promoting environmentalism through this episode.

"SpongeBob, You're Fired" was infamous for dialogue referencing the Supplemental Nutrition Assistance Program (Food Stamps benefit). In a scene from the episode, Patrick tries to show SpongeBob "the benefits of being unemployed," much to his disagreement. It eventually sparked a political debate when Media Matters for America and Al Sharpton on MSNBC accused both the New York Post and Fox News of using the episode.

In 2021, Nickelodeon announced that to remove "Mid-Life Crustacean" from not only the network, but Paramount+ and DVD sales as well. It was solely due its deemed inappropriate scene revolving panty raiding. "Kwarantined Krab" was the second removed episode initially meant to air during 2020; but delayed until April 29, 2022, due to the plot revolving around a pandemic as an on-going real-world COVID-19 pandemic arrived. However, these episodes it is available to purchase on iTunes and Amazon Prime.

==== Other Nicktoons ====
Rugrats was noteworthy among contemporary children's television for depicting observant, identifiable Jewish families. The Anti-Defamation League and The Washington Post editorial page castigated the series for its depiction of Tommy Pickles' maternal grandparents, accusing their character designs of resembling Nazi-era depictions of Jews.

Some segments of Ren and Stimpy were altered to exclude references to religion, politics, alcohol, violence, and tobacco. The episode "Powdered Toast Man" had a cross removed from the Pope's hat and the credit was changed to "the man with the pointy hat". The same episode had a segment featuring the burning of the United States Constitution and Bill of Rights that was removed, while in "Dog Show", the last name of the character George Liquor was removed, being changed to "George American". Many other episodes included someone smoking a cigar, pipe, or a cigarette.

Rocko's Modern Life is notable for its risqué humor. The series contained numerous adult innuendos, such as Rocko's brief stint at an implied sex hotline. Joe Murray noted that the season one episode "Leap Frogs" received "some complaints from some parents" due to its sexual humor, leading to Nickelodeon removing the episode from air for the remainder of the show's run, although it later aired on the cable channel Nicktoons and was made available on DVD and video streaming sites such as Netflix, and ultimately Paramount+.

The Angry Beavers often brought tension between Schauer and Nickelodeon, with the channel imposing seemingly arbitrary restrictions on the show's content amongst the show's younger viewers.

Invader ZIM would frequently find itself at odds with network censorship. In The Medium-Sized Book of ZIM Scrips Vol. 1, series writer Eric Trueheart described the ZIM staff and executives' relationship as dysfunctional. Some episodes intended for certain characters (such as Keef, Iggins, and even the main characters Zim and Dib) to die horrifically, much to the disagreement of Nickelodeon, and rewrite the episodes to where they would not die. "Bloody GIR," which depicted an image of GIR covered in blood, was created when series creator Jhonen Vasquez wanted to put this drawing into an episode of Invader Zim. Nickelodeon prohibited it, despite directors trying to sneak it across several episodes.

==== Allegations ====
In 2018, Nickelodeon ended its relationship with Dan Schneider after an internal investigation found that Schneider had been verbally abusive to those he worked with. Schneider had worked as a writer and producer at the network since 1995 and had created several Nickelodeon series including The Amanda Show, Drake & Josh, Zoey 101, iCarly, and Victorious. In 2021, former Nickelodeon producer Arthur Gradstein, who worked with Schneider for years told The New York Times that Schneider could be "unreasonably demanding, controlling, belittling and vindictive, with a willful disregard for boundaries or workplace appropriateness."

In her 2022 memoir, former child actress Jenette McCurdy wrote that the cast and crew underwent emotional abuse on the set of the series iCarly. She also alleges that while she was underaged a male Nickelodeon producer offered her alcohol and gave her a shoulder massage without her consent. McCurdy stated that Nickelodeon offered her $300,000 on the condition that she never talk about her experience working for the network.

In August 2022, former Zoey 101 actress Alexa Nikolas protested outside of Nickelodeon studios in Burbank, alleging that the network had failed to provide a safe work environment for her and other child actors that she knew. Nikolas called on the network to address these allegations and to release its former employees from nondisclosure agreements.

=== Removal of content from Paramount+ ===
Starting in June 2023, in a similar vein to HBO Max, several programs started being pulled Paramount+, including animated and unscripted series such as Blue's Clues & You!, Big Nate, It's Pony, As Told by Ginger, Middlemost Post, That Girl Lay Lay, Are You Afraid of the Dark?, Blue's Room, Big Time Rush, and Doug which was met with heavy backlash from fans, critics, actors, and creators alike.
