= Turnstone (company) =

- Type: Subsidiary
- Industry: Furniture
- Founded: 1993; 33 years ago
- Headquarters: Grand Rapids, Michigan, United States
- Areas served: North America
- Products: Office furniture, modular furniture
- Services: Office design consultation
- Parent: Steelcase
- Website: myturnstone.com

Turnstone is an office furniture company based in Grand Rapids, Michigan. It is a division of Steelcase and was founded in 1993. The brand was created with the intention of reaching younger businesses with budgets too small to afford a dedicated facilities manager and offices with a small number of in-office employees. As of January 2006, the company employed 30 people.

== Company overview ==
Turnstone's products are designed to meet the needs of small businesses, startup companies, and entrepreneurs. Initially, turnstone also focused on supplying the home-office market. Between 2002 and 2006, turnstone launched over 40 new products.

One aspect of Turnstone's product development process involves meeting with business leaders and uses observational research from the IIT Institute of Design, IDEO, and the d.school at Stanford University. They also visit co-working spaces to study how workers interact with their products.

Turnstone also researches and studies subjects like startup culture, company culture, and how people work. In 2013, Turnstone partnered with the Wharton School at the University of Pennsylvania to release a list of the 15 top young companies to work for.

James Hackett (businessman) became President of Turnstone in 1993. Kevin Kuske was Turnstone's general manager from 2009 to 2014. Brian Shapland became Turnstone's general manager in the spring of 2014.

== Events ==
Turnstone frequently organizes RV tours, bus tours, and events like the Turnstone Roadshow, a trip that brings a mobile office built in an 18-wheeler around the country to showcase workplace trends and research. The company has also toured using an Airstream RV as a traveling showroom.

== Designer collaborations ==
Turnstone has collaborated with outside designers for some of their products:

- Brian Kane, Jenny Chair
- Charles Perry, Uno Chair
- George Simmons, Crushed Can Stool
- Chuck Anderson, limited edition tabletop for the Campfire Paper Table
- Mark Schoolmeester, Buoy seat

== Awards and recognition ==
Some of Turnstone's products have awards at the NeoCon World's Trade Fair:

| Year | Award | Product |
|---|---|---|
| 2000 | Silver Award in Alternative Office | Crushed Can |
| 2001 | Silver Award in Alternative Office | Smoke Office System |
| 2004 | Silver Award | PET Lounge |
| 2007 | Silver Award in Work Surfaces and Furniture Systems | Tour System |
| 2009 | Gold Award | Campfire Table |
| 2011 | Gold Award | Bivi |
| 2013 | Innovation Award | Buoy |
| 2015 | Product Innovations | Campfire Additions |
| 2016 | Innovation Award | Bassline Tables |
| 2016 | Product Innovations | Bivi |

Other awards and nominations:

- 2004 Good Design Award for their Scoop stool from the Chicago Athenaeum Museum of Architecture and Design
- 2004 Good Design Award for their PET lounge seating from the Chicago Athenaeum Museum of Architecture and Design
- 2009 Good Design Award for their Campfire Big Lamp from the Chicago Athenaeum Museum of Architecture and Design
- 2009 Platinum Award winner in the ADEX Awards for the Tour Workspace
- 2011 Best of Year Award for the Bivi desk from Interior Design
- Their Shortcut chair was nominated for Interior Design's HiP Award in the Education/Institutional Furniture category in 2015
- Their Campfire additions were nominated for Interior Design's HiP Award in the Workplace: Furniture/Systems category in 2015

== Similar companies ==
- Steelcase
- Coalesse
- Izzy+
- Herman Miller
- Haworth
- Knoll
