= Veeker =

- Founded: 2005
- Headquarters: San Francisco, CA & Beijing, China
- Location: United States
- Website: http://www.veeker.com/

Veeker was a mobile-to-Internet video communication service and social networking site.

== History ==
Veeker was founded in September 2005, and was an early innovator in the evolution of mobile communication from audio and text to video. Veeker was headquartered in San Francisco, CA. Veeker was co-founded by Rodger Raderman (a founder of iFilm, a user-video upload site long preceding YouTube, now CEO of NukoToys), Alex Kelly, Marcus Yoder, Raj Singh (founder of ToneThis, one of the earliest ringtone creation software as of 2004). The original prototype was built for Veeker by Bogex, an engineering team headed by Arthur Sulit (co-founder of Snip n' Send, one of the earliest ringtone creation and distribution software and the first to work in-browser as of 2004, and original chief developer behind EasyRingtoneMaker) and Clint Mario Cleetus (founder or Bogex). Subsequent versions were built by a team of engineers headed by Daniel Reynaud (founder of ThumbJive, which initially explored mobile phone games, who worked later on at Google).

Veeker raised approximately $2.6m Series A from Silicon Valley VCs and a variety of angel investors. Several media outfits including NBC leveraged Veeker to power citizen journalism. Veeker commercials was run nationwide on a variety of its customers' media networks.

Veeker was one of the first platforms supporting near-real-time upload and sharing of mobile video, back in 2006, just prior to the arrival of the iPhone. For instance, one of its platform features enabled citizens to upload mobile videos to their profile page from wherever they were at, such as at a sports event, or a news location, and post the video for public viewing within seconds from their cell phone, entirely through specially encoded SMS texting to Veeker's servers from wherever the user is, without needing to log into a web browser.

== Mobile-to-internet video market ==
According to IDC, during the period between 2005 and 2009, 2.4 billion mobile phones equipped with video cameras were projected to enter the global marketplace. Veeker believed that mobile video communication will become pervasive, and was indeed one of a handful which were among the earliest adapters in that space. However, during May 2006, when Veeker's first demo was rolled out, difficulties in rapid-market adaption included potentially, that Internet-enabled smartphones and subscription plans were still highly expensive, small-screened, not user-friendly and unpopular, the primary modes of cellphone messaging being SMS, with few customers paying for MMS enabled plans. However, the website itself, with its Profile pages, and friends-of-friends ability to share selected videos or pictures, on a scrolling window, were considered innovative for its time. Many advanced features of Flash, integrated with then-emergent JavaScript libraries (before the popularity of JQuery today), were used, allowing users to interact intuitively with and organize their uploads or shares.

Veeker's platform supported both SMS and MMS methods to link audio media from users onto web servers. These types of features, and drastically lowered price of smartphone plans, became commonplace only a year or two later, after the iPhone was released on June 29, 2007.

== Notable events using Veeker ==
- Icer Air
- Veek the Vote 2006
