= GetBack (website) =

Social networking and multi-media website

GetBack.com was a social networking and multi-media website based out of Los Angeles, CA that was active between 2007 and 2010. Its aim was to help baby boomers rediscover pop culture from past decades and interact with their peers.

== History ==
In 2007, GetBack.Com was launched by executives from its sister company Shout! Factory along with veterans of IFILM and MTV.

The site collection of cultural media ranged from the 1960s through the 1990s. Users were able to watch music videos, TV clips, and interviews. There were also artist pages that include artist-related media as well as bios, timelines, "then and now" galleries, and comment boards.

Additionally, the site contained traditional social networking features such as profiles, chat, messaging and user-generated content uploads. Widgets and other elements were available, as well as early game classics such as Tetris, Frogger, and Super Mario Bros.

GetBack.com closed down in January 2010, with the intention of relaunching in March of that year. As of 2012, the site remains down, and its domain parked.
