= Gerrard Wendell Haworth =

Gerrard Wendell Haworth (October 11, 1911 – October 25, 2006) was the founder of office furniture manufacturer Haworth.

== Early life and education ==
Born in Nebraska, he moved to Benton Harbor, Michigan in 1926, where he attended high school. After graduating from Western Michigan University, he taught industrial arts at Holland High School in Holland, Michigan. Haworth also studied at the University of Michigan.

== Career ==
Hoping to earn extra money to put his children through college, Haworth started a woodworking shop in his garage in 1945. Three years later, he quit teaching to focus on his new company full-time, which was founded as Modern Products.

In 1975, his company moved to a new facility along M-40. In recognition of the move, the company became Haworth, Inc. In 1993, he was named the "Entrepreneur of the Year" by the University of Michigan Business School. In 2003, he cut back from working five days a week to three.

In 2005, G. W. Haworth retired completely from the company he started.

Haworth died on the morning of October 25, 2006, aged 95.

== Philanthropy ==
G. W. Haworth was a major supporter of many West Michigan causes.

Western Theological Seminary, Hope College, Grand Valley State University his alma mater Western Michigan University and Black River Public School, as well as the Boys and Girls Clubs of Greater Holland have all benefited from Haworth's donations.

== See also ==
Haworth
