= Steelcase =

Furniture company

Steelcase Inc.

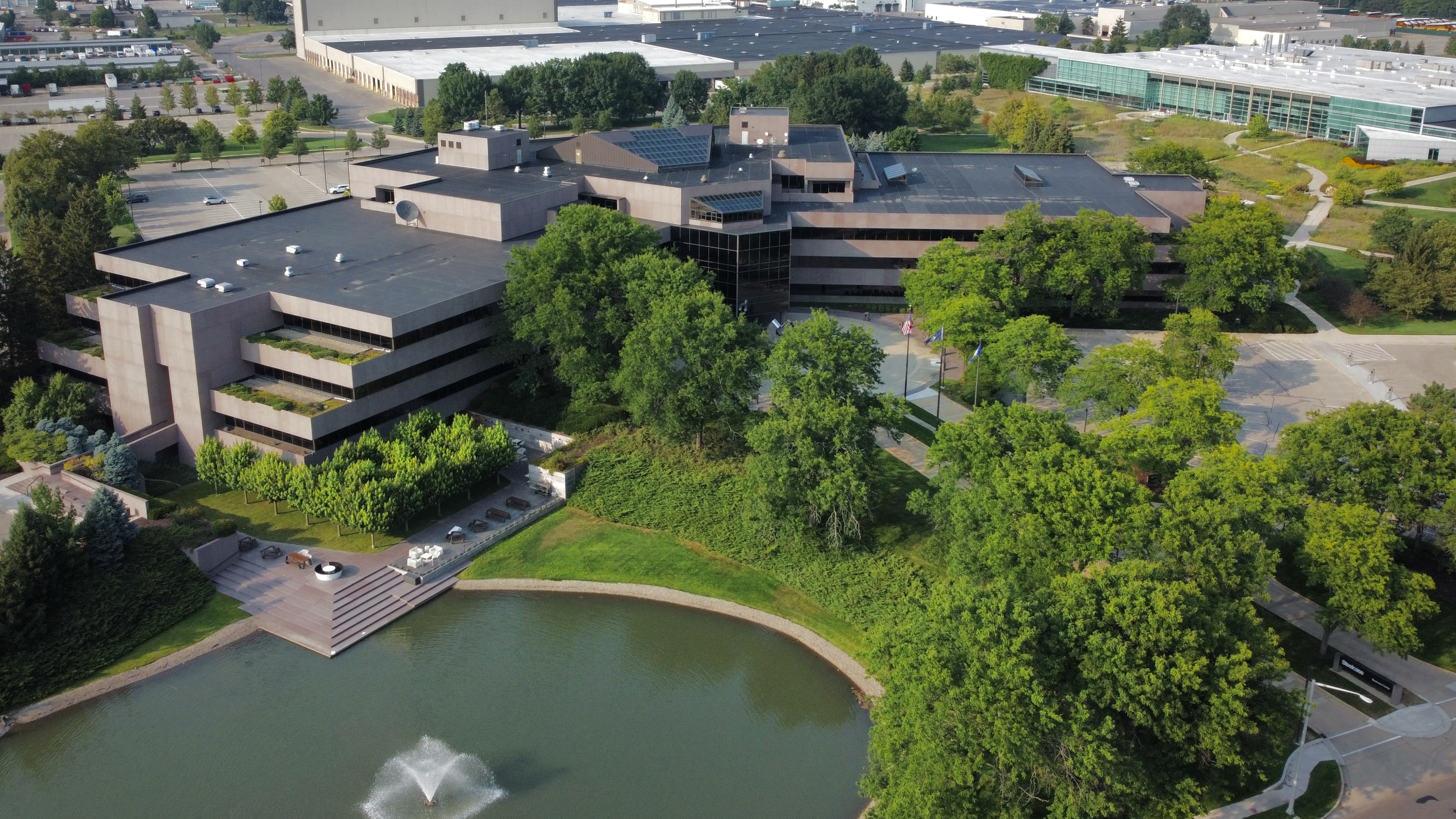
- Global headquarters of Steelcase
- Formerly: Metal Office Furniture
- Industry: Furniture
- Founded: March 16, 1912; 114 years ago in Grand Rapids, Michigan, United States
- Founders: Peter M. Wege; Walter D. Idema; David D. Hunting
- Headquarters: Grand Rapids, Michigan, United States
- Number of locations: 100+ (2026)
- Area served: Worldwide
- Products: Office furniture, architectural and technology for office environments and the education, health care and retail industries
- Owner: HNI Corporation
- Number of employees: 11,300 (2025)
- Website: steelcase.com

Steelcase Inc. is a company that designs, manufactures and sells office and residential furniture. The company also conducts research on workplace design and behavior, which informs the development of its furnishings, architectural systems, and workplace technologies. Its products are distributed primarily through a global network of independent dealers. Founded in 1912, it is headquartered in Grand Rapids, Michigan, United States.

== History ==
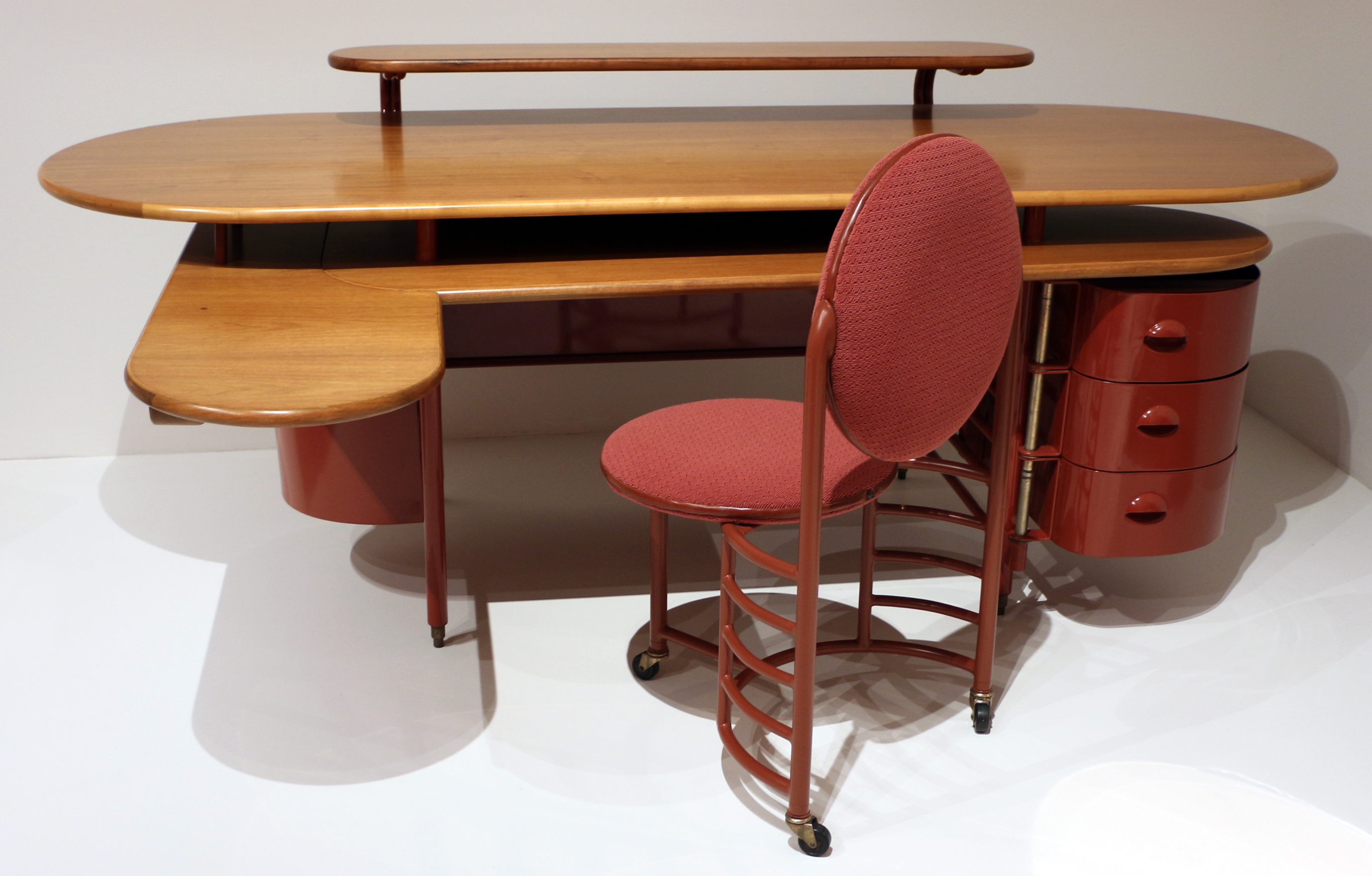
Workstation by Frank Lloyd Wright and Steelcase c. 1937

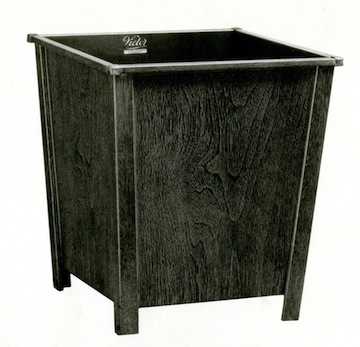
The Victor wastebasket c. 1914

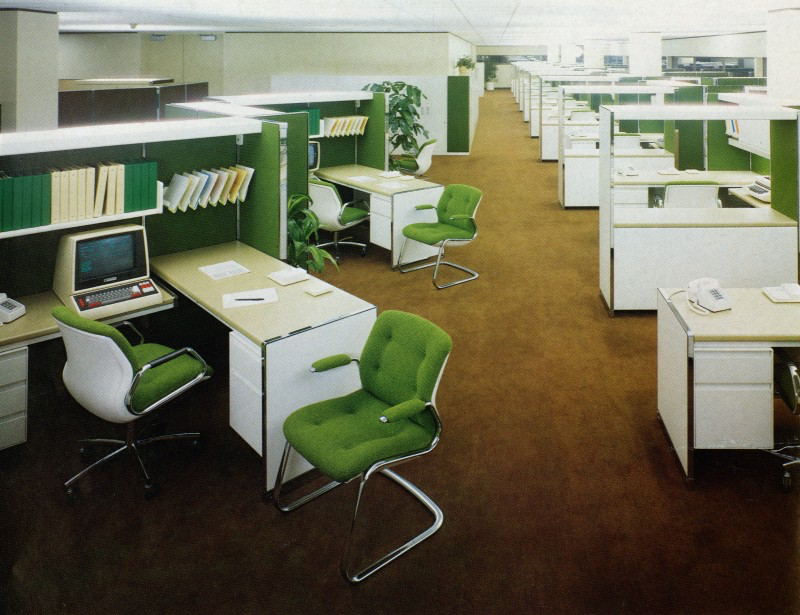
1977 Series 90001

Originally known as the Metal Office Furniture Company, it was founded in 1912 by Peter Martin Wege, who had filed approximately 25 patents related to the sheet metal and fireproofing industries. Its early products included fireproof metal safes and four-drawer metal filing cabinets.

In 1914, the company received its first product patent for "The Victor", a fireproof steel wastebasket. The Victor gained popularity due to its light weight—achieved through a patented process of bending flat steel at right angles to create boxes—and its ability to prevent fires at a time when smoking was common indoors, particularly in the workplace.

In 1915, the company began manufacturing and distributing steel desks after designing and producing 200 for Boston's first skyscraper, the Custom House Tower.

The name Steelcase was a result of an advertising campaign to promote metal office furniture over wood and was trademarked in 1921. The company officially changed its name to Steelcase, Inc. in 1954.

In 1937, the company collaborated with Frank Lloyd Wright on office furniture for the Johnson Wax Headquarters. The partnership lasted two years and resulted in some of the first modern workstations.

After becoming one of the leading companies in the office furniture industry during the previous decade due to its sales volume, it expanded into new markets during the 1970s, including Asia, Europe, and North Africa. In 1973, it debuted the Series 9000 furniture line, a panel-based office system that became a best seller and its flagship brand.

Also in 1973, Steelcase delivered the largest single furniture shipment to the then-new Sears Tower; the delivery included 43,565 pieces of furniture and furnished 44 floors.

In 1996, Steelcase became the majority shareholder of the design firm IDEO, whose CEO, David M. Kelley, was appointed vice president of technical discovery and innovation by the new owner.

Meanwhile, it was found at fault in a patent infringement suit brought against them by Haworth, another furniture company. The Michigan firm was ordered to pay $211.5 million in damages and interest, thus ending a 17-year dispute with Haworth.

Steelcase became a publicly traded company in 1998 under the symbol SCS. During the 2000s, Steelcase reorganized its workforce and began integrating modern technologies in its products. In 2000, the company opened Steelcase University, a center for ongoing employee development and learning.

Steelcase's wood furniture plant in Caledonia, MI earned LEED certification in 2001, becoming the first plant to receive the certification. In 2002, Steelcase partnered with IBM to create BlueSpace, a "smart office" prototype designed using new office technologies.

In 2010, after selling back its shares in IDEO to its managers, in a process initiated three years earlier, Steelcase and its former subsidiary launched new models for higher education classrooms called LearnLabs.

In January 2016, it recalled 12 models of Steelcase "Rocky" style swivel chairs manufactured between 2005 and 2015, due to a fall hazard. In 2025, HNI Corporation announced it would acquire Steelcase for $2.2 billion. The acquisition closed in December 2025.

=== Steelcase Inc. Corporate Development Center ===
In 1989, the company opened the pyramid-shaped Steelcase Inc. Corporate Development Center, containing ten research laboratories and workspaces meant to encourage interdisciplinary collaboration on product development. After being left vacant in 2010, the building was sold to Switch, Inc. six years later.

== Noteworthy products ==
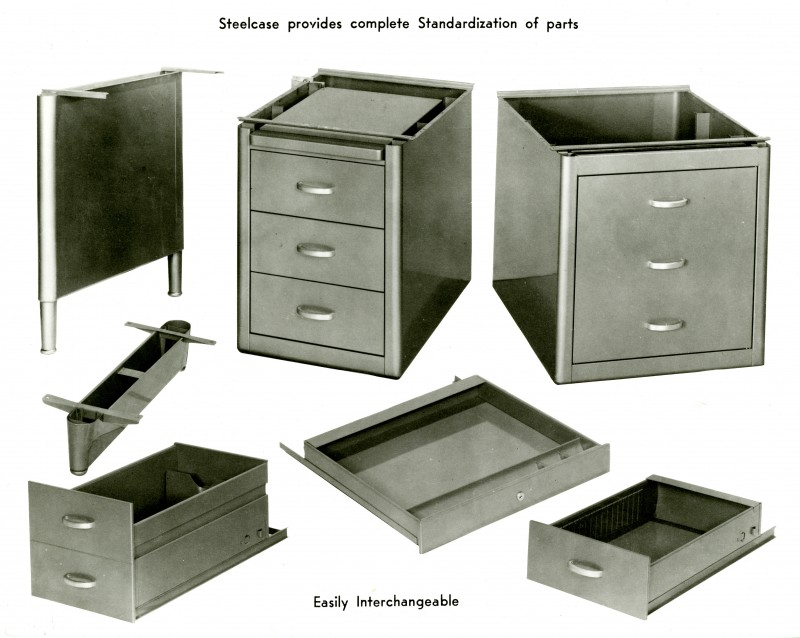
1945 Steelcase Metal Office Furniture

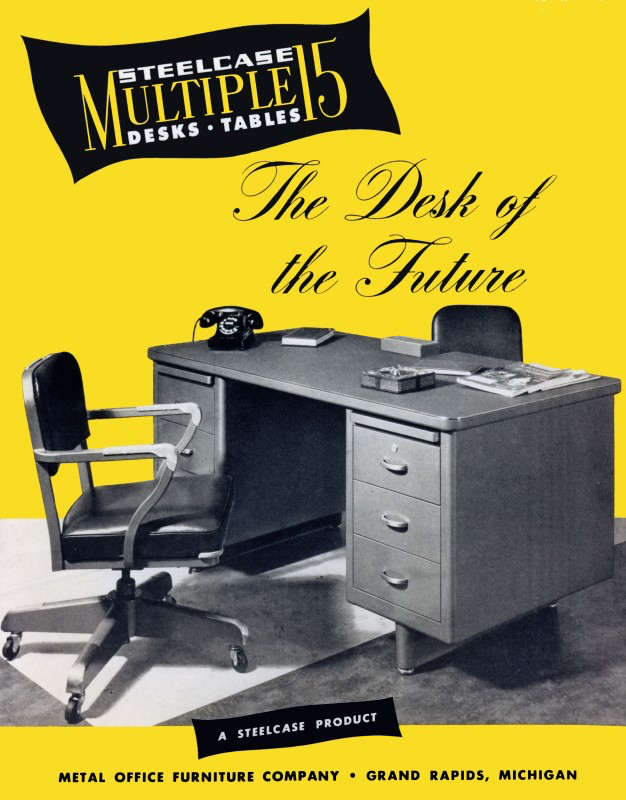
Multiple 15 desk

One of the company's earliest products was "The Victor", a fireproof steel wastebasket introduced in 1914, which became widely used in offices at a time when fire prevention was a significant concern.

In 1945, Steelcase introduced modular metal office furniture systems that allowed for standardized components and flexible configurations. The approach enabled a wide range of desk and table arrangements and supported the repair, replacement, and reuse of individual components over time.

Steelcase released Multiple 15 desks in 1946, which introduced standardized desk sizing and became a universal industry standard.

Series 9000 was released in 1973 and became Steelcase's most popular line of office systems.

The Leap chair, introduced in 1999, sold 5,000 units a week during its first year and became one of the company's most widely known products. The ergonomic office chair was designed with eight adjustable areas for users to control, including chair height, armrest positioning, lumbar support, seat depth, and back positioning. The chair was developed over four years, cost $35 million to design, and resulted in 11 academic studies and 23 patents.

The company released the Gesture chair in 2013, which is designed to support the way workers naturally sit.

== Brands ==
Subsidiaries include AMQ, Coalesse, Halcon, Orangebox, Smith System, and Viccarbe, as well as several other brands such as Steelcase Health and Education. The company established an office accessories brand called Details in 1990. In 1993, Steelcase launched Turnstone, a line of furniture designed for small businesses and home offices. Designtex, which produces interior textiles and upholstery, was acquired in 1988.

Nurture was founded in 2006 to create products for the health care industry, including furniture and interiors for waiting rooms, offices, and clinics, and was rebranded as Steelcase Health in 2014.

Steelcase merged three of its subsidiaries (Brayton International, Metro Furniture and Vecta) to form Coalesse in 2008. Coalesse products are intended for "live/work" environments, reflecting the overlap between home and office in modern working habits.

== Company culture ==
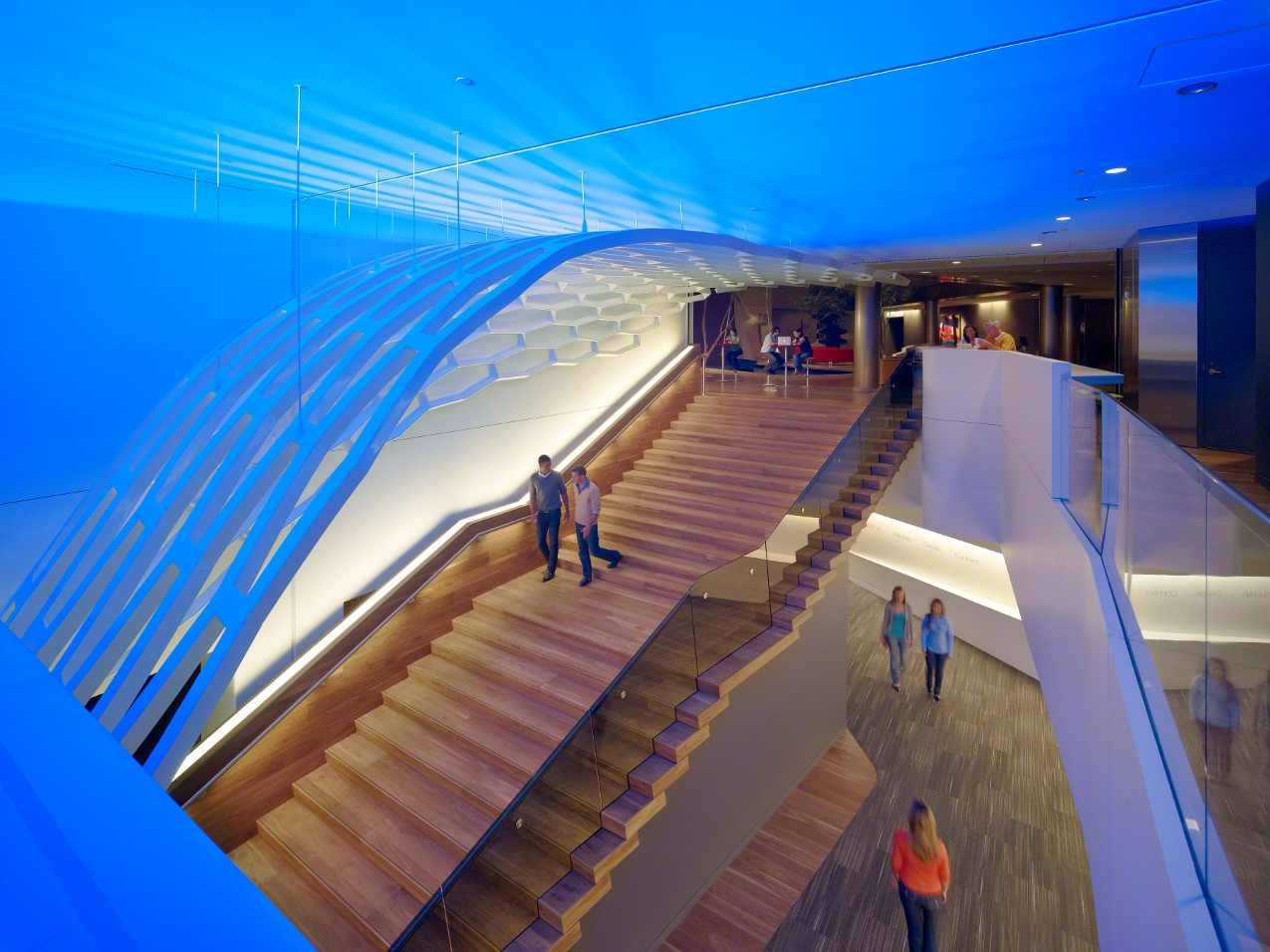
The WorkCafe in Steelcase Corporate Headquarters, Grand Rapids, Michigan

In 1985, Steelcase purchased the Meyer May House designed by Frank Lloyd Wright and restored it, opening it to the public in 1987. A corporate art program has resulted in a collection including pieces by Pablo Picasso, Andy Warhol and Dale Chihuly.

The company employs a research group called WorkSpace Futures to study workplace trends. In 2010, Steelcase underwent a three-year project to update its Grand Rapids headquarters to promote employee productivity and employee well-being, including redesigning a cafeteria into an all-purpose work environment that provides food service and space for meetings, socializing, and independent work.

Steelcase has reported initiatives related to sustainability, including efforts to reduce packaging, use regional facilities to limit shipping distances, and reduce greenhouse gas emissions and water consumption. The company has also set targets related to reducing its environmental footprint. As of 2012, Steelcase reported reductions in waste, emissions, and water use compared with earlier baseline years. The company has also referenced analysis of its supply chain and materials in relation to product sustainability, and has reported involvement with Cradle to Cradle-certified products.

Steelcase announced in 2020 that it had achieved carbon neutrality for its operations and set a goal of becoming Carbon negative by 2030, with targets aligned to climate science initiatives. The company has also emphasized the use of green chemistry and has reduced the use of materials such as Polyvinyl chloride (PVC) in its products.

== Awards ==
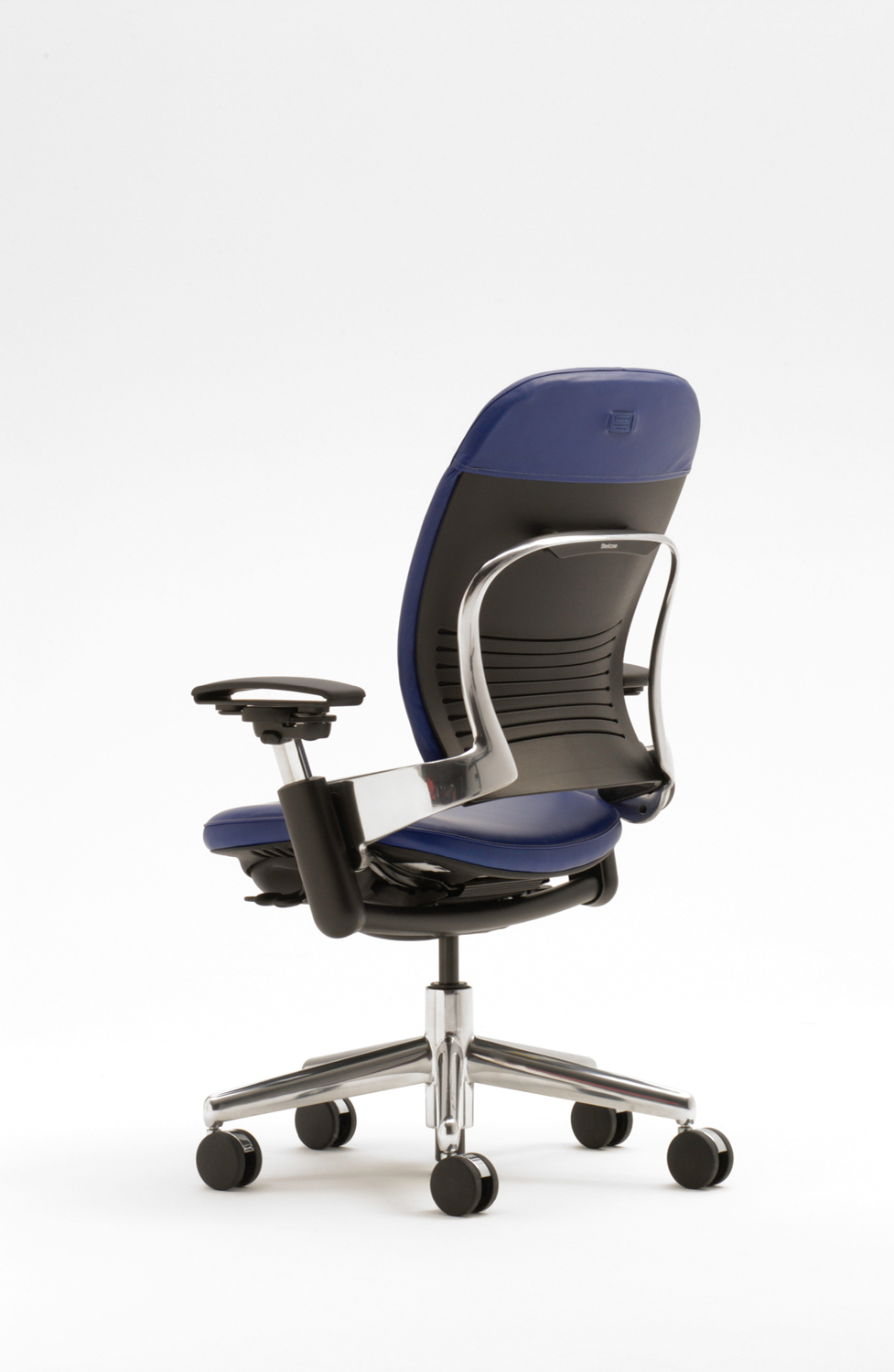
Leap chair

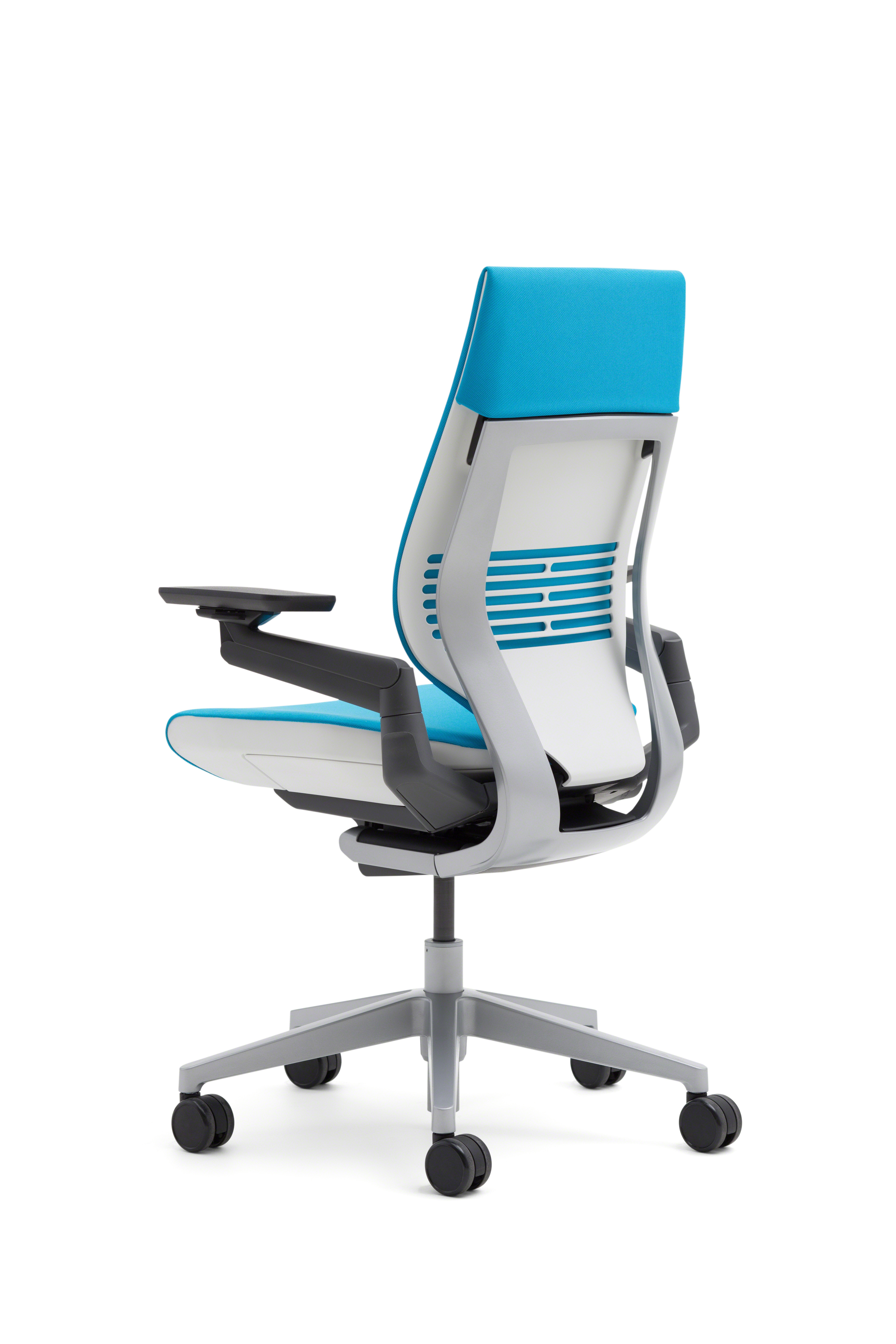
Gesture seating

Steelcase has received industry and design recognition, including awards at NeoCon and the Red Dot Design Award. Recent recognition includes multiple Best of NeoCon awards and honors from design publications such as Interior Design. The company has also been included in Fortune's "World's Most Admired Companies" rankings.
