= VideoSift =

Video aggregation website

- Website type: Video Community
- Owner: Brian Houston
- Creators: Brian Houston and James Roe
- Website: www.videosift.com
- Registration: Free, but with optional Charter Membership
- Launched: February 2006

VideoSift is a video aggregator designed to showcase unique and interesting videos, the name of the site being a direct allusion to the metaphor of sifting wheat from chaff. It was founded by Brian Houston in February 2006, who was joined by James Roe and Rommel Santor as co-creators. Members submit embedded videos from other websites, such as YouTube and Google Video, which are then ranked according to a social-voting system similar to and inspired by Digg. Nicknamed the Sift, VideoSift intends to provide users with online-available quality video content through a consistent and appealing interface, thereby minimising the effort for users to find videos among different sources with different or unintuitive user interfaces.

== Concept ==
Members submit videos from a limited selection of approved hosts, these videos are then entered into a queue where other members may vote them up or down. If a video receives the requisite balance of positive votes it is published to the front page and remains available in the site's archives; if it fails to achieve this within 2 days it is moved to the users profile in a "personal queue". A broad range of videos may be posted; only those with entire episodes of television programs, pornography, fatalities or racism are expressly prohibited.

Following a loose organisation in the founding era of the site, the site founders allowed any user to submit videos, subject to a changing limit depending on the volume of traffic. With the growth of the site's popularity over the course of 2006, upgrades were introduced leading to VideoSift 2.0 and later iterations that required new users to graduate through a "probationary period". This was meant to mitigate sockpuppet (internet) and astroturfing abuses that became more tempting for outsiders considering the site's increasing popularity.

Routine administrative functions such as discarding expired videos are carried out by a bot named Siftbot.

=== No-self links policy and the Siftoff ===
VideoSift has a policy of "no self-links", which means contributing videos that the VideoSift user ("Sifter") created themselves. In addition to functioning as a means to prevent astroturfing, it allows for an extra step of "sifting" - a third party must first approve of the video by selecting it for submission before the original creator can cast a vote for it.

In response to Sifters' desire to showcase their own videos, occasional Siftoffs have been held, with the first in May 2006. Videos in the Siftoff are uploaded to a separate queue where users have a month to decide, through the normal voting mechanisms, which video of this subset group is most worthy. The siftoff has since been removed again.

The ability to permanently ban members who self-link is given to those who have gained "gold star" status within the VideoSift community. Two users must both invoke the *ban command, which will make the system ban the offending member. This is often used for those who spam, or self-link videos to the site and has been known to be used swiftly and effectively by senior members of VideoSift.

In January 2008 an instaban feature was introduced, that allows users with diamond level membership to instantly ban a probationary member without confirmation from another user.

=== Curatorship through seniority ===
The volunteer members of the VideoSift community have the possibility to get de facto administrator powers with a long-term commitment to the website. After accumulating 50 star points, members gain such abilities as discarding posts in violation of guidelines or flagging videos NSFW.

The ability to "downvote" a video was introduced in June 2006, allowing the Sifter with a moderate seniority level - those with a bronze star meaning 25 star points. , to police against videos they consider unworthy or unappealing. Downvoting met with some controversy as users adjusted to the phenomenon, and set informal guidelines on usage.

Members help to improve VideoSift's versatility by suggesting new feature requests and existing feature changes whilst keeping a simple interface.

== Technology ==
VideoSift used to be based on an open source content management system called Pligg, which is in turn a port of software written by Ricardo Galli . His software received much of its inspiration from the popular technology site, Digg.

Prominent and skilled users have been invited to join the original two founders throughout the Sift's history. Rommel Santor became the Development Manager later in 2006, contributing his skills in coding to add extensive new features to the site's codebase.

In Summer 2007 VideoSift 3.0 launched, breaking away from the Pligg system to use its own software. The new program was written by Rommel Santor and is called VaroCMS.

In January 2008 VideoSift 3.1 launched, still using VaroCMS, but bringing many sweeping changes.

=== Accepted video embeds ===
For compatibility reasons VideoSift accepts only videos in the Flash format, and only from the following websites: YouTube, Break.com, Revver, Vimeo, MetaCafe, Google Video, iFilm, Myspace, Onion, VideoJug, Yahoo, Dailymotion, LiveLeak, VSocial, Fora.tv and Grouper.

Comedy Central submissions were banned after Comedy Central's decision to block non US-based viewers for their content (region blocking), but the ban was reversed and is under an ongoing discussion. Members who have achieved a 'gold' status can submit other flash based video content such as CollegeHumor or Adult Swim videos

=== Video organization ===
VideoSift at its core is a video organization site. Videos are organized by their tags and channels, which an inputted but the submitting user and can be changed and/or amended by senior users of the site. Channels are not generated in advance, but created by users when they reach a certain level of membership, diamond or more, which is then sent to the administrators, evaluated and approved/rejected as the case may be. Certain suggestions have been declined on the grounds of duplication; for example, the ‘tech’ channel was considered too similar to ‘science’ and ‘geek’.

As of September 2010 the following 98 channels are available: Animation, Art, Actionpack, Asia, Anatomy, Blues, Books, Bravo, British, Brain, Comedy, Cute, Canada, Catsanddogs, Celtic, Cinema, Comics, Commercial, Conspiracy, Controversy, Cult, Cooking, Downunder, Dance, Dark, Documentaries, Drugs, Debunked, Election08, Electronica, Eia, Equality, Eco, Engineering, Fail, Femme, Fire, Future, Fear, Gay, Geek, Grindhouse, Horrorshow, Happy, Hiphop, Howto, Humanitarian, Health, History, Islam, Jazz, Kids, Latenight, Law, Livemusic, Love, Lies, Music, Mystery, Military, Metal, Money, Magic, Meme, Nature, News, Obscure, Politics, Parody, Philosophy, Religion, Rocknroll, Sexuality, Scifi, Science, Shortfilms, Sports, Standup, Spacy, Teens, Timeshift, Talks, Terrible, Travel, Videogames, Vintage, Viral, Worldaffairs, Waronterror, Woohoo, Wilhelm, Water, Wtf, Wheels, Wildwestshow, Wings, 1sttube and 80s.

==== Earlier organization ====
As soon as a video receives the required number of votes it is published to the front page, which is arranged in reverse chronological order. Videos can be further filtered by the user according to most votes in a year, month, week, 24 hours and all time.

With the launch of VideoSift 2.2 'channels' were added to browse by and filter out videos by their respective categories. Currently these are: Animation, Art, Comedy, Cute, Geek, Music, Nature, Politics, Vintage, and Viral. A video may be in as many channels as are applicable.

Additionally, VideoSift now allows senior users to create collectives of users to sift even more specific niche videos.

=== Decline in quality ===
Following the growth of the site, critics argued the quality of the videos within would inversely decline in quality. The way the voting system works, a video with more votes is considered of higher quality than one with fewer votes, thus equating quality with popularity. Like Wikipedia, there are many high-level users, who work to uphold the quality and integrity of the site, so that things like astroturfing and spam are kept to a minimum. Users are allowed to have their own agendas, political or otherwise, which for an outside viewer may appear as a launchpad for these opinions. The site owners deny the claim whist arguing that the discussion forum "Sift Talk" debates these exact things.
