= Coalesse =

American furniture company

- Formerly: Brayton, Metro, Vecta
- Company type: Subsidiary
- Industry: Furniture
- Founded: 2008
- Headquarters: Grand Rapids, Michigan, United States
- Areas served: Worldwide
- Products: Furniture for workplace and related environments
- Parent: Steelcase
- Website: www.coalesse.com

Coalesse is a United States–based furniture company founded in 2008. It is a division of Steelcase and designs furniture for workplace and related environments. The company is headquartered in Grand Rapids, Michigan, with design operations in San Francisco.

== History and operations ==
Coalesse launched in June 2008 at the NeoCon World's Trade Fair in Chicago. It was formed through the combination of Steelcase's Brayton, Metro, and Vecta brands, and has collaborated with manufacturers including Carl Hansen & Son, Walter Knoll AG & Co., Viccarbe, and PP Møbler.

The brand initially focused on furniture designed for both residential and workplace settings, often described as "live/work" environments, and later shifted toward greater emphasis on workplace applications.

In 2012, the company announced plans to expand its business operations into Europe.

Coalesse operates as part of Steelcase's portfolio of brands focused on workplace design.
