= Haworth Inc. =

Office furniture company

- Type: Private
- Industry: Office furniture
- Predecessor: Modern Products; Modern Partitions
- Founded: 1948; 78 years ago, in Holland, Michigan, United States
- Founder: Gerrard Wendell "G. W." Haworth
- Headquarters: Holland, Michigan, United States
- Number of locations: 75
- Area served: Worldwide
- Key people: Matthew R. Haworth (chairman); Franco Bianchi (president & CEO)
- Products: Compose; Fern chair; Enclose Walls; Openest Lounge; Haworth Collection
- Revenue: US$1.96 Billion (2021)
- Number of employees: 7,500
- Divisions: North America; Europe; Asia/Pacific
- Website: haworth.com

Haworth Inc. is a privately held, family-owned office furniture manufacturer headquartered in Holland, Michigan, United States. Founded in 1948 by G. W. Haworth, the company designs and manufactures seating, tables, movable walls, panels, storage, and wood casegoods. Haworth's furniture pieces, combined with interior design and technology, are intended to create a focus on "organic workspaces that help people perform their best." Haworth employs 7,500 workers and has 650 dealerships in more than 120 countries. 2021 global sales reached $1.96 billion, a 6.2-percent increase from 2020.

== History ==
=== 1940s–70s ===
During the 1940s, while teaching Industrial Arts at Holland High School, G.W. Haworth started a woodworking shop as a hobby in his garage. His intention was to increase the income for his children's future college education by producing and selling special-order wood products. As his reputation and orders grew, he expanded to a 4,800-square-foot plant in Holland, Michigan and decided to turn his sideline into a full-time business, launching Modern Products in 1948. In the 1950s, the focus of Modern Products shifted toward office environments in response to the development of modular office partitions, and the company changed its name to Modern Partitions.

In 1976, G.W.'s son, Dick Haworth, took over as president and CEO. Under Dick's leadership, the company's name changed to Haworth and focused exclusively on contract office furniture. Dick invented the first cubicle wall panels with internal wiring. These panels could be snapped together and eliminated the client's need to pay electricians to wire office spaces. In 1977, Haworth International Inc. was formed to set up foreign licenses for the manufacture and marketing of office interior systems. A year later, Haworth opened a national showroom in Chicago's Merchandise Mart.

=== 1980–2000 ===
During the next two decades, Haworth developed and patented a number of industry innovations, including panel-to-panel cabling systems. In the early 1980s, the company moved its headquarters to One Haworth Center in Holland, while showrooms were open or renovated in 18 North American cities and four international locations. Office seating was also added to the Haworth product offering being built in Holland, Michigan. By 1986, Haworth had become the third-largest office furniture manufacturer in the U.S., with sales topping $300 million and a workforce of 2,600 employees.

In 1988, Haworth became a global company after undertaking a strategic expansion. The business acquired 15 companies in Europe and North America, then built in Asia to expand its sales and dealer network. In 1995, the company's Ideation Group formed, applying user-based research to concepts and products. In 1996, competitor Steelcase was found at fault in a patent infringement suit brought by Haworth in 1985. Steelcase was ordered to pay $211.5 million in damages and interest.

=== 2000 to present ===
In 2000, Haworth passed the $2 billion mark in annual revenues. In 2008, Haworth's new corporate headquarters, a LEED-NC Gold-certified facility, opened to serve as a living lab. In 2009, Haworth became the first company in the industry to achieve zero waste to landfill in all U.S. manufacturing facilities. That same year, Dick Haworth stepped aside and his son, Matthew, then 40, became chairman.

The company purchased Italian furniture group Poltrona Frau in 2014, gaining a majority stake in several Italian design brands including Cappellini, Cassina, and Poltrona Frau. In 2013, Bluescape was launched to support virtual work and visual collaboration. "We recognized that our deep insight into the physical workplace could be translated into user experience in a virtual workspace," Dick Haworth said. The company purchased outdoor furniture company JANUS et Cie for an undisclosed amount in 2016. In 2017, the company's headquarters was given a design refresh by Patricia Urquiola and Haworth Collection, which partnered with Pablo Designs and GAN rugs.

== Structure ==
Haworth's brand portfolio includes Italian design brands Poltrona Frau, Cassina, and Cappellini; technology software Bluescape; and outdoor furniture maker JANUS et Cie. The Haworth Health Environments brand offers healthcare furniture. Haworth also owns shares in BuzziSpace, a Belgium-based company focusing on acoustic and collaborative workspace.

Franco Bianchi has served as CEO and president of the company since 2005. In 2009, Dick Haworth stepped aside and his son, Matthew, became chairman of the family-owned business. The company's founder, G.W. Haworth, died in 2006 at age 95.

== Company culture ==
Haworth issued special bonuses to workers totaling more than $5 million for the company's 70th anniversary in 2018.

Haworth became the first in the contract furniture industry to achieve zero waste to landfill in all U.S. manufacturing facilities in 2009. The company also donated 42 acres of wetland for restoration to Outdoor Discovery Center-Macatawa Greenway's Project Clarity, an organized effort to improve the water quality of Holland's Lake Macatawa.

Haworth maintains research partnerships with several global partners, including Fraunhofer-Gesellschaft in Germany, University of Michigan, Western Michigan University and London's Royal College of Art. The company's Human Performance Lab studies the impact of visual distractions on workplace performance.

== Noteworthy products/projects ==
Popular Haworth products include its research-backed ergonomic office chairs Fern, Zody, and Very, and Planes Height-Adjustable tables.

Haworth has partnered with numerous designers, including Patricia Urquiola, a Spanish architect and designer who has been a Haworth collaborator since 2013. Studio Urquiola designed Haworth's Chicago showroom for NeoCon 2013, 2014, and 2015, and gave the company's corporate headquarters a refresh in 2017.

Spectrum Health, West Michigan's largest healthcare provider, tapped Haworth to furnish their idea for a new kind of doctor's office, with the Strive health care office opening in downtown Grand Rapids in 2017. The facility functions as a learning lab for Spectrum to test new ideas and develop a deeper understanding of consumer needs.

In June 2021, a nearly 2-year project to renovate the Haworth Hotel in Holland was completed. The renovation, funded jointly by Hope College and the Haworth family, was led by designer Patricia Urquiola. The newly remodeled building is intended to "foster interactions between Hope College staff and students, community members and Haworth guests."

The headquarters site includes a 15-acre prairie restoration project (6.1 ha).
