= Bluescape =

Technology company in Silicon Valley, California

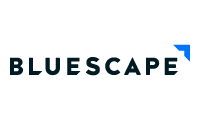
- Type: Private
- Industry: Software
- Founded: San Francisco, California, United States (2012)
- Headquarters: San Carlos, California, United States
- Area served: United States
- Products: Visual Collaboration Software
- Services: Visual Collaboration
- Number of employees: 230+
- Website: www.bluescape.com

Bluescape is a software-as-a-service (SaaS) company based in San Carlos, California. It develops a visual collaboration platform that supports remote collaboration.
