= IFilm =

Defunct video sharing website

iFilm
- Website type: Video hosting service
- Headquarters: San Francisco, California, U.S.
- Owner: Defy Media
- Creators: Raphael Raphael – Founder; Rodger Raderman – Founder; J. Patrick Forden – Co-Founder; Luke McDonough – Co-Founder; Kevin Wendle – Co-Founder
- Industry: Internet
- Commercial: Yes
- Registration: Not required
- Launched: 1997; 29 years ago
- Current status: Closed in 2008

iFilm is a discontinued U.S.-based video-sharing website on which users could upload, share and view videos. It was founded by filmmaker Raphael Raphael in 1997. It was later acquired by iFilm.net, a popular online interactive film and media archive, originally specializing in independent films. Ifilm.net was founded in 1998 by new media entrepreneurs Roger Raderman, J. Patrick Forden, and Luke McDonough. Percepticon Corporation engineered and built the website and content publishing system. Greg Deocampo, the founding CTO, developed the core engineering team, encoding network, presentation engine, and ad serving network. Its URL is now owned by Defy Media.

== Company history ==
iFilm was founded in 1997 by filmmaker Raphael Raphael as a thinktank for artists and technicians about future directions of film. Raphael sold the domain to Rodger Raderman, founder of iFilm.net. The original intent of iFilm was to make short, independent films available online. It rejected home movies and pornography, but was open to all other film types. By August 1999, the site had over 450 movies, offices in New York, Los Angeles, and San Francisco, and employed 40+ people. Also during the summer of 1999, film editor Andrew Hindes and former sales and marketing head of Variety (magazine) Coco Jones joined the iFilm team. "If the consumer thinks about 'films', then we want them to come to iFilm as their first point of entry," said founder Rodger Raderman. "We see ourselves as the portal – the first stop on the web for all things film-related."

iFilm had many high-profile investors, such as Axiom Ventures, Inc., Eastman Kodak, Liberty Digital, Rainbow Media (Now AMC Networks), Sony Pictures Entertainment, Vulcan Inc., and Yahoo!.

iFilm suffered serious losses in 2000 as a result of the dot-com bubble bust. It reorganized under CEO Kevin Wendel in 2001 and rebounded with a new focus on viral video. Prior to 2005, when YouTube was founded, iFilm was one of the primary destinations for viral videos on the internet.

=== Acquisition ===
On October 15, 2005, under CEO Blair Harrison iFilm was purchased by Viacom for $49 million, with the hopes of creating their own user-generated YouTube rival. Instead, in December 2006, iFilm was bundled with MTV Networks' entertainment group. iFilm had a brief life with MTV Networks. On January 13, 2006, a television series presented as a collaboration between iFilm and VH1 titled Web Junk 20 debuted on VH1. The show was marginally popular, airing for 3 seasons.

=== Rebranding ===
Erik Flannigan, MTV Networks' VP of digital media, suggested that the core audience of iFilm, who were primarily young males, aligned perfectly with Viacom's Spike. During the first quarter of 2008, the two brands were merged. The iFilm brand was no more and re-branded and re-purposed as Spike.com. The content of Spike.com was set to be composed of Spike programming, Comedy Central clips, GameTrailers and MTV videos. When Defy Media bought the URL from Viacom in 2014, it changed it so it redirects to Defy property Screen Junkies.

== Investors ==
iFilm had many high-profile investors, such as Axiom Ventures, Inc., Eastman Kodak, Liberty Digital, Rainbow Media (now AMC Networks), Sony Pictures Entertainment, Vulcan Inc., and Yahoo!.

== Content ==
Triumph the Insult Comic Dog first became a "viral video" at iFilm.

== See also ==
- YouTube
- Google Video
- Metacafe
- Revver
- vMix
- blip.tv
- Videosift
