= Studio 28 =

Former movie theater in Wyoming, Michigan, United States

Coordinates: 42.91241°N 85.69918°W

- Interactive map of Studio 28
- Address: 1350 28th Street SW; Wyoming, Michigan
- Owner: Jack Loeks Theatres, Inc.
- Capacity: 6,145
- Type: Multiplex movie theater
- Screen: 20

Construction
- Opened: December 25, 1965
- Closed: November 23, 2008
- Demolished: March 25, 2014

Website
- Archived website

Studio 28 was a cinema multiplex located on 28th Street in Wyoming, Michigan from 1965 to 2008. Opened by movie theater pioneer Jack Loeks, it expanded from originally having one screen to having over 20 screens, the most in the United States, and was the largest multi-screen cinema complex in the world by area. By 1996, Studio 28 had about 1.7 million annual visitors. A decline in moviegoers and competition from other cineplexes in the metro area lead to Studio 28 closing in 2008. The Loeks family's entertainment legacy continued with his other Celebration Cinema locations operating throughout Michigan following the closure of Studio 28.

== History ==
=== Beltline Drive-in ===
A 1982 photograph of the Beltline Drive-In in Wyoming, Michigan, by John Margolies

In the 1940s, movie theater pioneer Jack Loeks, began to build a chain of movie theaters in the Grand Rapids metropolitan area, purchasing an abandoned gravel pit on 28th Street, then also known as the "South Beltline", in Wyoming, Michigan. At the 28th Street property, Loeks opened the area's first drive-in theater in 1948, named the Beltline Drive-in, which featured a 90 ft (27 m)-tall screen for visitors to view films from their vehicles in a parking lot with about 600 spots. The complex was constructed on what was then a dirt road at a cost of $100,000 in 1948, the equivalent to $1,404,918 in 2024. The first film shown at the Beltline Drive-in was The Red Stallion on the opening day of July 10, 1948.

The Beltline Drive-in expanded through its history to a total of three drive-in screens and a capacity of 850 vehicles. Its main screen featured neon lighting and two large images of Bugs Bunny and Goofy. In the 1950s, the drive-in also featured rides for children, a miniature golf course and a driving range.

As the drive-in was not always operating, a flea market began to operate in the car lots in May 1970. A trampoline park was also temporarily located near the Beltline Drive-in.

=== Opening of Studio 28 ===
Studio 28 opened on Christmas Day 1965 with a single 1,000-seat theater. In 1967, Loeks expanded into what was originally going to be retail space, adding a second screen dubbed the "Little Studio", making the location the first multiplex in the eastern half of the United States. The second screen commonly showed features for children when the big screen was showing a feature for older audiences, or a film with a niche audience while the main screen showed a more commercial feature.

=== Multiplex expansions ===
The complex expanded to six screens in 1976, enabling it to accommodate extended runs of the popular blockbusters of the era, while still having screens for new releases.

Studio 28 expanded in 1984 to twelve screens with a 4,000 seat capacity, initiated a computer ticket system and created a policy to always have at once G-rated movie playing at all times for children. The expansion cost an estimated $1.5 million, the equivalent to $4,529,308 in 2024, and made the multiplex the largest in the Midwestern United States.

The Beltline Drive-in closed in August 1987 as Studio 28 began a new expansion. In December 1988, Studio 28 completed its expansion to twenty screens, the most in the United States, with a final seating capacity of 6,145 in a 125,000 sq ft (11,600 m^{2}) complex. The update also introduced THX audio to the theaters. As the largest multiplex movie theater in the world by area, Studio 28 was described as "the crown jewel of the company" by Barrie Loeks in 1989, then vice president of Jack Loeks Theatres Inc.

The complex broke a single day attendance record on November 29, 1990, serving 16,000 guests, a record which still remains unbroken (Home Alone and Dances with Wolves were in their opening weeks at the time). Citing the success of the multiplex at the time, Jack Loeks shared aspirations in 1994 to expand Studio 28 to a total of twenty-eight screens, to match the name of the complex, which was originally chosen for the street name. That year, about 1.5 million visitors attended films at Studio 28. On May 17, 1995, AMC Grand 24 overtook Studio 28 as the largest movie theater in the United States, with vice president of Jack Loeks Theatres Inc., Ron VanTimmeran, saying "We knew this day was coming, and it has been a nice run," while acknowledging that Studio 28 was still larger in seating capacity and square footage.

In 1996, Studio 28 had its peak attendance record of 1.7 million annual visitors. At the time, VanTimmeran noted that movie rentals were beginning to take away business from theaters, noting that it was more convenient for families to view films from within the comfort of their homes. Renovations in 1999 resulted with all theaters having stadium seating, except for the 1,000 seat Theater One.

=== Decline and closing ===
Into the 2000s, Studio 28 saw a sharp decline in attendance. Loeks opened several other cinemas in other parts of the metro area, including Celebration Cinema North and Celebration Cinema South. Cinemark built new multiplexes at nearby RiverTown Crossings Mall and Woodland Mall, oversaturating the market. The opening of RiverTown Crossings also drew shoppers away from Wyoming, which was once the center of retail in the Grand Rapids metro area, leading to less attendance to Studio 28.

In February 2004, Loeks died, leaving behind his legacy of purchasing an abandoned gravel pit and building it into the largest movie theater in the nation. By 2006, only 550,000 people visited the multiplex. In an attempt to revive ticket sales, Studio 28 obtained a liquor license in 2007 and announced that it would close a theater to convert into a banquet hall. However, attendance at Studio 28 decreased to around 25% of what it was twelve years earlier, with about 400,000 annual visitors that same year. On November 23, 2008, Studio 28 closed, with its final film being presented being Madagascar: Escape 2 Africa.

The City of Wyoming condemned the building on December 23, 2013 citing an unstable roof and other hazards. On March 25, 2014, the building was demolished. On July 28, 2019, the 28th Street Flea Market ended its operations after nearly 50 years of being located in Studio 28's former parking lot after plans were made to redevelop the area. The City of Wyoming initially promoted the vacant lot as being redeveloped into a new retail corridor known as 28 West, though the location ultimately was replaced by apartment complexes. Bricks from Studio 28, as well as the "Studio" sign from the theater, were later incorporated into the Studio C theater in downtown Grand Rapids, Michigan.

== Attractions ==
External videos
- A 1995 video providing a tour of Studio 28 on YouTube
- A 2001 Studio 28 advertisement, showing features of the multiplex on YouTube

Studio 28 featured an arcade game area and a simulator ride using Showscan technology, with the ride including four films; the Street Luge, Devil's Mine Ride, Cosmic Pinball and Street Fighter II Ride.

Records
| Preceded by Universal CityWalk Hollywood; 18 Screens | Largest movie theater in the United States; Studio 28; 1988–1995; 20 screens | Succeeded by AMC Grand 24; 24 Screens |
