= Rapid Central Station =

Bus station in Grand Rapids, Michigan, United States

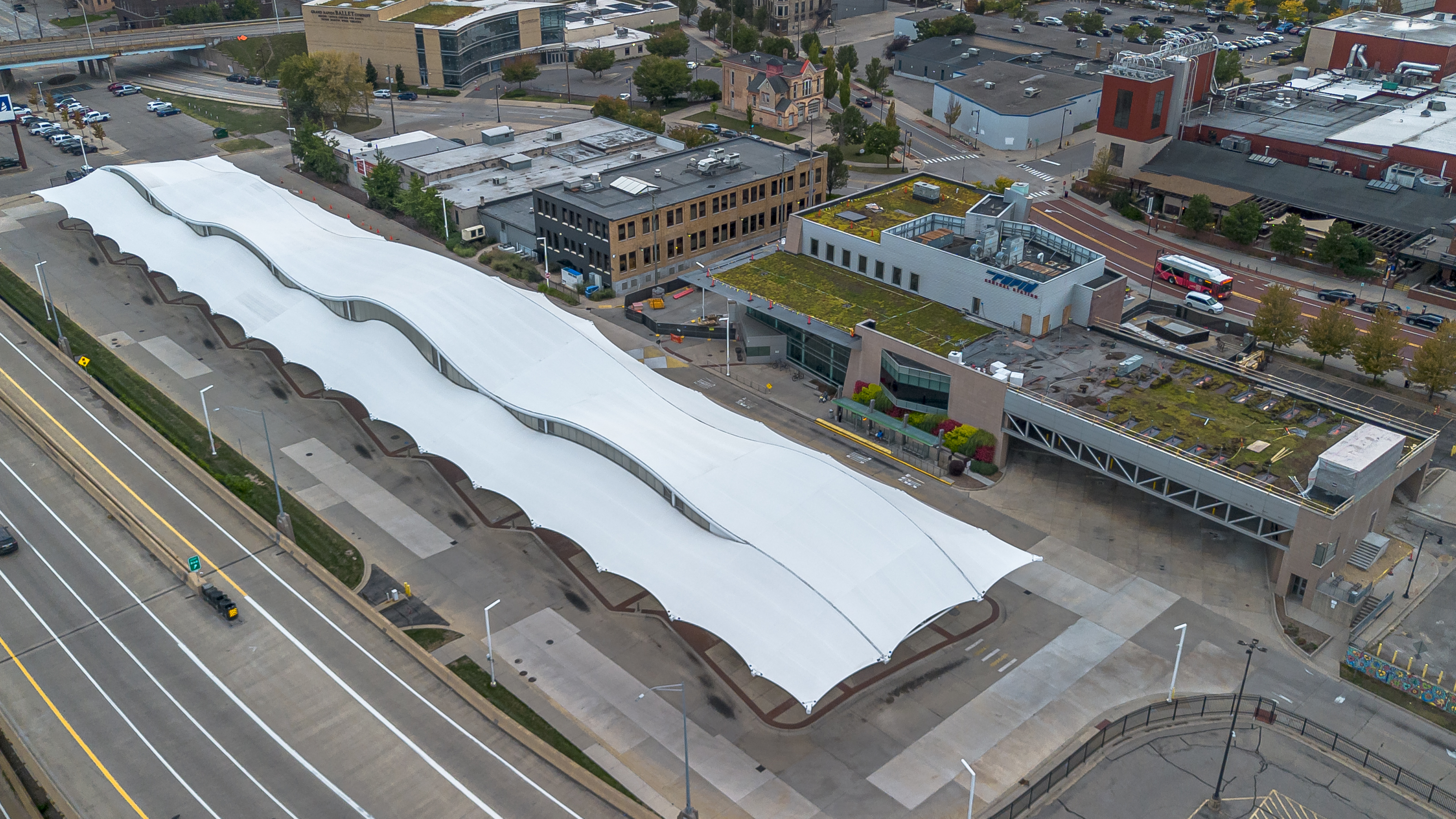

General information
- Location: 250 Grandville Ave SW, Grand Rapids; Michigan, United States
- Coordinates: 42°57′29″N 85°40′21″W
- Owner: The Rapid
- Bus stands: 16 city bus, 4 coach, 1 BRT
- Bus operators: The Rapid, Indian Trails
- Connections: Vernon J. Ehlers Station (Amtrak)

Construction
- Structure type: Ground level
- Accessible: yes

History
- Opened: 2004

Services
Preceding station	Amtrak	Following station
Out-of-system interchange
Holland toward Chicago	Pere Marquette transfer at Grand Rapids	Terminus
Location

Rapid Central Station (also known as the Transit Center) is an intermodal transit station in downtown Grand Rapids, Michigan. It is operated by The Rapid and serves as Grand Rapids' main city bus station as well as a station on the Silver Line bus rapid transit. It is located on Grandville Avenue between Cherry Street and Wealthy Street, and is the BRT's northern terminus. It is just yards north of the city's intercity rail station, the Vernon J. Ehlers Station, on Century Avenue.

== History ==
The station was built in 2004 at the cost of $22 million to serve as both a new bus station and a terminus for intercity coach routes such as Greyhound and Indian Trails. Greyhound moved its operations from 190 Wealthy Street SW on the corner of Grandville Avenue to be part of the intermodal station. It was the first transportation center in the US to receive LEED certification.

The year 2014 saw two major additions to the station. The Silver Line was completed in August adding a platform to the space between the building's eastern entrance and the coach bays. Just two months later, the city's Amtrak station opened at its new location 100 yards (91 m) south of the bus station.

As Grand Rapids' major bus transfer point, the station features sixteen bays for city buses. Most bus transfers are made on the central platform, while access to the BRT and the Indian Trails coaches is from the station building to the west.

An information desk and ticket counter for the Rapid is located inside the station building, along with similar facilities for Indian Trails services. There are also vending machines. Outside of information desk hours, ticket machines on the central platform allow riders to reload fare cards.

Central Station is no longer served by Greyhound, which currently operates from a curbside stop adjacent to a Burger King restaurant at 410 Pearl St NW.

== Local service ==
Service operates based on a mass arrival and departure system known locally as the "line-up". The regular routes 1-16 and 18 all operate around the framework of quarter-hourly arrivals and departures. On weekdays, major routes depart at :15 and :45, while others depart at :00 and :30 during the day before reverting to :15 or :45 timings in the evenings. Incoming buses are scheduled to arrive around 7–10 minutes prior to their scheduled departure.

The final "line-up", or departure, of the day is delayed until all participating buses have arrived and any transferring passengers have reached their desired vehicle.

Rapid bus routes serving Central Station (as of August 29, 2016)
			Frequency			
Number	Route	Destination	M-F	Sat	Sun	Notes
SL	Silver Line	60th Street Park N' Ride	10-30	30	60	Local service (Wealthy-54th) provided by Route 1.
1	Division	54th Street Meijer	30	30	30	
2	Kalamazoo	Kentwood City Hall	15-30	30-60	30	15-minute service only to 28th Street Meijer; Interlined with Route 9 on Saturdays
3	Madison	Hope Network	30-60	60	none	
4	Eastern	Gaines Twp Meijer	15-30	30-60	60	15-minute service only to 28th Street; Interlined with Route 6 on Saturdays and Route 9 on Sundays
5	Wealthy/Woodland	Woodland Mall (Kentwood Station); Peak extension to 33rd/Patterson	15-60	60	none	15-minute service only to Breton Village; Interlined with Route 15 on Saturdays
6	Eastown/Woodland	Woodland Mall (Kentwood Station)	15-30	30-60	60	Interlined with Route 4 on Saturdays
7	West Leonard	Meijer (Standale)	15-60	60	60	Interlined with Route 15 on weekdays
8	Grandville/Rivertown Crossings	Rivertown Mall/Meijer	15-60	60	60	15-minute service only to Goodwill
9	Alpine	Alpine Walmart	15-30	30-60	60	15-minute service only to Greenridge Mall
10	Clyde Park	54th St. Meijer	30-60	60	60	Interlined with Route 16 on Sundays
11	Plainfield	Plainfield/Elmdale	15-30	60	60	
12	West Fulton	Standale Meijer	30-60	60	none	Interlined with Route 13 during Weekday mid-day
13	Michigan/North Fuller	Michigan Veterans Facility	30-60	60	none	Interlined with Route 12
14	East Fulton	Leonard/Ball	30-60	60	none	
15	East Leonard	Knapp's Corner	15-60	60	60	Interlined with Route 7 on weekdays and Route 5 on Saturdays
16	Wyoming/MetroHealth	MetroHealth	30-60	60	60	Interlined with Route 8 on Saturdays and Route 10 on Sundays
18	Westside	Lake Michigan at Covell	30-60	60	none	
100	Ferris State Express	Ferris State University	4 trips	none	none	No schedule when no college classes

== Inter-city service ==
Long distance routes serving Grand Rapids at Central Station
Service	Number	Cities from	Cities to	Notes
Amtrak	370	Chicago IL, St. Joseph/Benton Harbor, Bangor, Holland		
Amtrak	371		Holland, Bangor, St. Joseph/Benton Harbor, Chicago IL	
Greyhound	4588	Detroit, Southfield, E. Lansing, Lansing	Muskegon	
Greyhound	4590	Detroit, Southfield, Ann Arbor, Jackson, E. Lansing, Lansing	Muskegon	
Greyhound	4591		Lansing, E. Lansing, Southfield, Detroit	
Greyhound	4592	Detroit, Southfield, E. Lansing, Lansing		
Greyhound	4593	Muskegon	Lansing, E. Lansing, Southfield, Detroit	
Greyhound	4595	Muskegon	Lansing, E. Lansing, Jackson, Ann Arbor, Southfield, Detroit	
Indian Trails	24	Chicago IL, Gary IN, Benton Harbor	Lansing, E. Lansing, MSU, Perry Jct, Flint, Saginaw	
Indian Trails	31	Lansing		offers timed transfer from Bay City, Saginaw, Flint, Owosso
Indian Trails	33	Flint, Perry Jct, E. Lansing, Lansing	Kalamazoo, WMU, Benton Harbor, Gary IN, Chicago IL	Amtrak Thruway route 8555 from St. Ignace, Mackinaw City, Cheboygan, Alpena, Tawas City, Bay City, Saginaw transfers at Flint
Indian Trails	80/82	(82) Kalamazoo	(80) Rockford, Cedar Springs, Howard City, Morley, Stanwood, Big Rapids, Reed City, Cadillac, Manton, Kingsley, Traverse City, Charlevoix, Petoskey, Alanson, Pellston, Mackinaw City, Sault Ste. Marie	Amtrak Thruway 8364
Indian Trails	81/83	(81) Sault Ste. Marie, Mackinaw City, Pellston, Alanson, Petoskey, Charlevoix, Traverse City, Kingsley, Manton, Cadillac, Reed City, Big Rapids, Stanwood, Morley, Howard City, Cedar Springs, Rockford	(83) Kalamazoo	Amtrak Thruway 8365
Indian Trails	86		Kalamazoo	
Indian Trails	87	Kalamazoo		Amtrak Thruway 8465
Indian Trails	93		Holland, South Haven, Benton Harbor	
Indian Trails	94	Benton Harbor, Holland		
Indian Trails	95		Holland, South Haven, Benton Harbor	

Amtrak schedules:
Indian Trails schedules:
Greyhound schedules:
