= Shops at CenterPoint =

- Location: Grand Rapids, Michigan, United States
- Coordinates: 42.91528°N 85.57835°W
- Opened: 1967; 59 years ago
- Developer: Eastern Shopping Centers, Inc.
- Manager: Stonemar Properties
- Owner: Stonemar Properties
- Num. of stores: 80+
- Num. of anchor tenants: 5
- Floor area: 575,000 sq ft (53,400 m^{2})
- Floors: 1
- Public transit: The Rapid
- Website: shopsatcenterpoint.com

Shops at CenterPoint is a large, open-air power center in Grand Rapids, Michigan, located at the busy intersection of 28th Street and East Beltline Avenue, across from Woodland Mall. Originally an enclosed mall called Eastbrook Mall, it was renovated into its current outdoor format, featuring a mix of major retailers like Nordstrom, Best Buy, TJ Maxx, HomeGoods, Old Navy, and Bath & Body Works.

== History ==
Eastbrook Mall opened in 1967. At the time, it featured approximately 50 stores, with three anchor stores: discount department store chain Woolco anchored the eastern end, while local department stores Wurzburg's and Steketee's anchored the western and northern ends, respectively. Woolco closed in 1982, later becoming Burlington Coat Factory.

In the 1980s and 1990s, many inline tenants closed, including two of its anchors: Witmark in 1997, followed by Steketee's three years later. Lormax Stern acquired the mall from Visser Brothers in 2000, renovating the center and renaming it Centerpointe Mall. Steve & Barry's was added in 2001, followed by several other inline stores such as Lane Bryant. Also, Burlington Coat Factory re-located outside the mall, with its space being converted to Linens 'n Things. A skate park called Modern Skate & Surf opened in the former Witmark, while Steketee's was demolished for Nordstrom Rack and two new mall entrances. Throughout 2004 and 2005, Old Navy, DSW Shoe Warehouse, and David's Bridal (an out parcel) opened as well, taking up space formerly occupied by smaller tenants.

== Redevelopment ==
Although several new stores were added under Lormax Stern's ownership, most of the smaller inline spaces remained vacant. Because of its low occupancy rate, the mall was slated in mid-2007 to be re-developed as a new shopping center with outdoor, pedestrian-friendly structures. Nordstrom Rack, Menards, Steve & Barry's and Dunham's Sports would have remained in their existing locations under these plans. while remaining stores would have received new locations within the center. Redevelopment was to have been completed in 2009. These plans were later canceled, however. In mid-2008, Klingman's relocated to a property in the nearby city of Wyoming, while Linens 'n Things closed its Centerpointe Mall store along with eight other Michigan locations in May, and was converted to a Jo-Ann Fabrics superstore in 2009. Steve & Barry's closed in late 2008 and became a clothing store called Wear District. Also in 2008, the mall's developers indicated interest in opening office tenants in the mall to fill vacancy. Modern Skate and Surf closed in November, 2011.

In late 2011, Lormax Stern announced plans to begin a de-malling project and converting into a strip mall. Work began in March 2012.

New tenants included HomeGoods and TJ Maxx which were built as a combined store where the Klingman's was demolished, Rue 21, Ulta (in the former Modern Skate & Surf), and The Vitamin Shoppe. The existing David's Bridal, Men's Wearhouse, TJ Maxx, and DSW stores were relocated. Menards closed its store at the mall in March 2013. A year later, a portion of its former location became Planet Fitness. This location is the second-largest in the chain. In 2014, Centerpointe Mall was renamed The Shops at CenterPointe.
