= Lincoln Park Shopping Center =

Early shopping center - 1957 Detroit

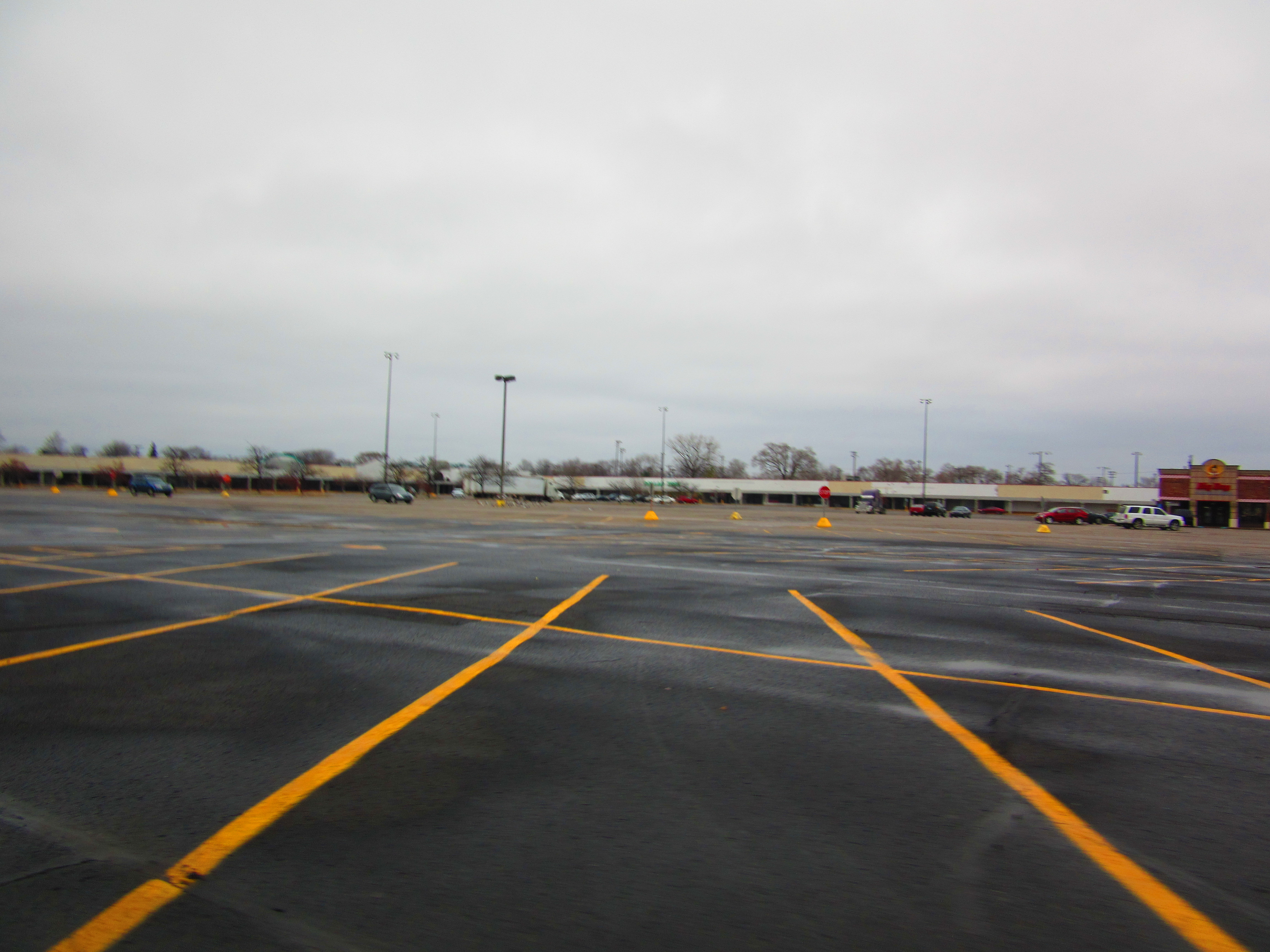
- Vacant stores overlooking empty parking lots at the Lincoln Park Shopping Center, December 2014
- Location: Allen Park and Lincoln Park, Michigan, United States
- Coordinates: 42.2575°N 83.1937°W
- Address: Southfield Road and Dix Highway
- Opened: 1956; 70 years ago
- Closed: January 6, 2019; 7 years ago
- Num. of stores: 35 at peak
- Num. of anchor tenants: 1
- Floors: 1 (2 in Sears)
- Public transit: SMART

Lincoln Park Shopping Center (also referred to as Sears Shopping Center) was a shopping center located at the corner of Southfield Road and Dix Highway, mostly in Lincoln Park, Michigan, though a portion containing a former Farmer Jack supermarket and a former Wendy's restaurant (now a Del Taco location) lay in neighboring Allen Park. Anchored by Sears and completed by 1957, it was one of the first large-scale strip complexes in the Downriver Detroit suburbs prior to the 1970 opening of Southland Center.

After Fairlane Green opened in Allen Park in 2005, the Lincoln Park Shopping Center would lose many of its tenants to the newer complex, while losing others to retailer bankruptcies during the Great Recession and the retail apocalypse, which culminated in Sears' closure in 2019.

== History ==
=== Construction, opening and heyday ===
The city of Lincoln Park already had a large-scale strip development within its boundaries, Lincoln Park Plaza, which opened in 1955 at Fort Street and Emmons Boulevard. However, it was the Lincoln Park Shopping Center that prominently placed Lincoln Park in a position of serving the community for many years to come.

Construction began in 1955 and the first store, Sears, opened in 1956. This was followed shortly thereafter by a Kroger supermarket. In early 1957, the strip mall itself held its official grand opening with a parade of elephants on Dix Highway. Among other original tenants were a Kresge dime store and a Cunningham drug store.

In 1958, WXYZ radio erected a remote broadcasting booth along Dix Highway. During the 1960s, the center's Sears store was cited as the chain's highest-grossing store, so much to the point that an addition to the store's Auto Center would be built. Up until closure, the Lincoln Park Shopping Center location was one of the largest stores in the Sears chain.

In 1965, Harold Stulberg became the manager of the Lincoln Park Shopping Center and between 1983 and 1995 embarked on a multi-year renovation project, based on customer surveys taken in 1980, which resulted in Dunham's Sports, Pier 1 Imports, Winkelman's ladies apparel, So-Fro Fabrics and Harmony House, the latter displacing a Big Boy restaurant that moved to a separate building along Dix Highway, all opening stores in the center. This included a major expansion in 1988, which saw the openings of the Jack Loeks Star Theatres Lincoln Park 8 movie theater in May and of F&M Distributors on August 1. By this point, Kroger had already moved to a newer store further south on Dix Highway, which would be replaced by other supermarkets beginning after a union strike in 1984 prompted Kroger to close many of their Michigan locations. By 1997, Kroger would return to the vicinity by opening the current store across Southfield Road.

=== Decline ===
As the decline of neighboring Detroit intensified in the early 1990s, these problems began spreading into Lincoln Park itself, resulting in declining property values in the immediate vicinity of the Lincoln Park Shopping Center. In the mid-1990s, several independent stores that were in the center were shuttered and when F&M Distributors went out of business, its store was also shuttered. Harmony House's location closed with the chain in 2002 and the Star Lincoln Park 8 showed its final films and shut down a year later in 2003, citing competition from new megaplexes at the Southgate Shopping Center and Fairlane Town Center, the latter of which Star had also owned at the time.

The center's death knell came in 2005 when the Fairlane Green ("The Hill") and Independence Marketplace power centers opened about a mile north in northern Allen Park. Many Lincoln Park Shopping Center tenants, including Dunham's Sports, Old Navy and Dress Barn, moved to newer locations at both centers. Those that remained at the center, including President Tux, Hallmark Gold Crown, KB Toy Works, GameStop, GNC, Payless Shoe Source and Famous Footwear, would eventually leave as well, either relocating to "The Hill" or to other area locations or due to corporate bankruptcies, especially as the Great Recession began taking tolls both on the retail industry and on property values around the complex. The Lincoln Park Shopping Center was the site of two failed Walmart Supercenter proposals in 2007 and 2012, both of which have resulted in disputes with Sears. In early 2012, plans were announced to demolish the entire center except for the Sears building.

In 2015, Sears Holdings spun off 235 of its properties, including the Sears at Lincoln Park Shopping Center, into Seritage Growth Properties. It, along with Dollar Tree, were the only remaining inline tenants left at the complex by that year. Additionally, two buildings existed in the outlot along Dix Highway, consisting of a Big Boy restaurant and a Bank of America branch, and a third outlot building on Southfield Road in Allen Park that formerly housed a Wendy's restaurant before it moved to a location across Dix Highway in December 2014. By June 2017, Dollar Tree would relocate to a former Walgreens store a block southeast on Southfield Road, which left Sears as the only tenant of the large-size strip complex. All connected buildings, except Sears, were torn down by March 2018. Despite the Sears anchor continuing to rank among the chain's highest-grossing stores, on October 15, 2018, Sears announced that its Lincoln Park Shopping Center location would close as part of a plan to close 142 stores nationwide after filing for Chapter 11 bankruptcy. The store closed on January 6, 2019. By June 2019, the former Wendy's building on Southfield Road reopened as a Del Taco location.

== See also ==
- Retail apocalypse
