= Fairlane Green =

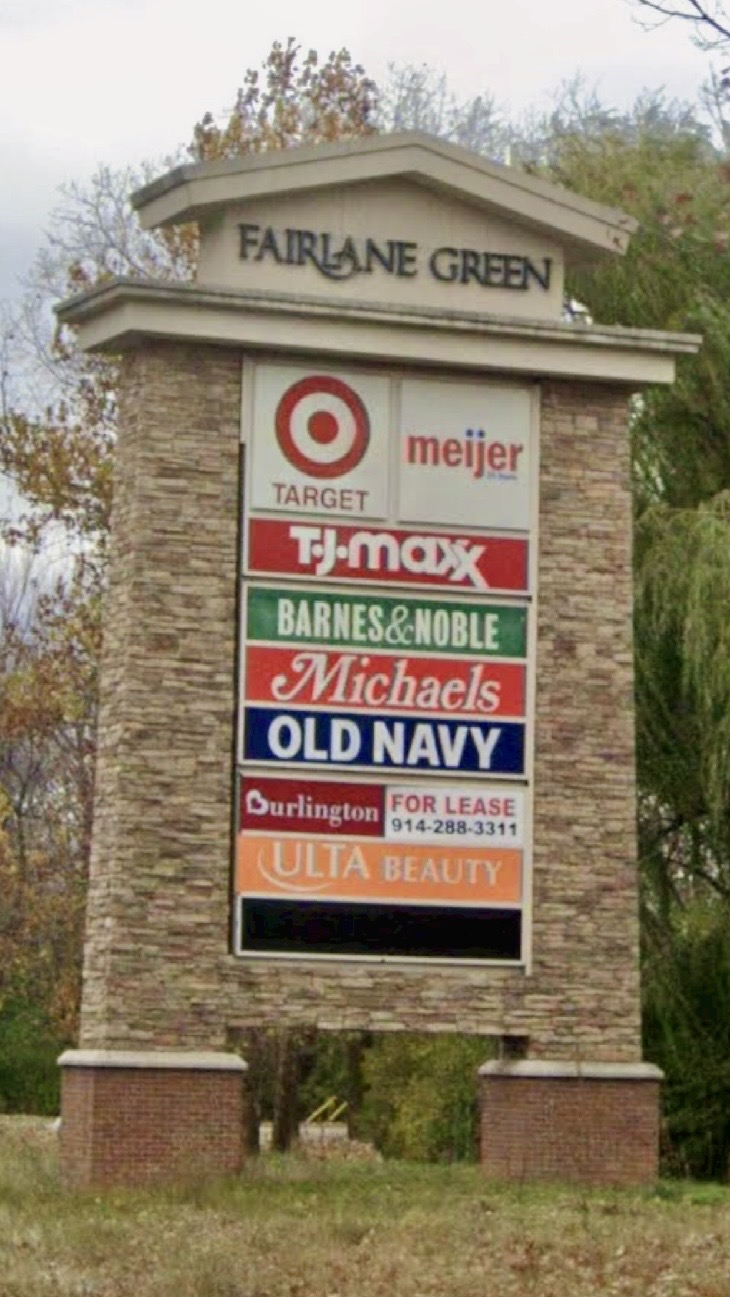
- Shopping center directory as of 2023
- Location: Allen Park, Michigan, United States
- Coordinates: 42.2682°N 83.2013°W
- Address: Fairlane Drive
- Opened: 2005-2028 (in "Phases")
- Developer: Ford Land Development
- Floors: 1
- Public transit: SMART: 140

Fairlane Green, also known as "The Hill" to locals, is a power center in the United States city of Allen Park, Michigan, which is part of the "Downriver" Detroit community. It is built on top of a former landfill and was opened to the public in phases starting in late 2005.

The elevation of Fairlane Green is high enough to allow one to see most of the skyline of Downtown Detroit from the northern end of the complex, as well as the Gordie Howe International Bridge and Ambassador Bridge, weather permitting.

== History ==
Prior to the construction of Fairlane Green, there was only one large shopping development within the city of Allen Park outside of the downtown area, the Lincoln Park Shopping Center, which was anchored by Sears. Even then, only a very small portion was actually within Allen Park. The vast majority of it lay in adjacent Lincoln Park.

Development of what became Fairlane Green began in December 2002, when Ford Land Development, the real-estate division of the Ford Motor Company, received a special use permit to redevelop a former clay mine that extended from Outer Drive and Snow Avenue to Oakwood Boulevard and ran parallel to M-39 and Interstate 94. The original proposal, which also included recreational facilities, was approved in August 2003. Ford Land had intended the complex to anchor the southern gateway to the Fairlane corridor through Allen Park and Dearborn, including the Fairlane Town Center mall.

In May 2004, the portion of the complex site that included the former site of the Allen Park Veterans Administration Medical Center was sold to Lormax Stern and REDICO, which became Independence Marketplace. Construction began on both centers a few months later.

== Phase I ==
Target was the first to open on October 9, 2005 within "Fairlane Green I", joined by several other tenants, including those that relocated from the Lincoln Park Shopping Center.

Cost Plus World Market closed in 2010 and was replaced by Five Below, which was later downsized to accommodate Dollar Tree.

Pier 1 Imports and Bed, Bath & Beyond closed following their respective bankruptcies in the early 2020s and were replaced by Rally House and Burlington.

The center's TCF Bank branch was rebranded as Huntington Bank in 2021.

As of May 2026, there are two unleased spaces in Phase I.

== Phase II ==
The second phase, "Fairlane Green II", which initially included Meijer, Best Buy, LA Fitness, and The Home Depot, opened in 2007. The recreational elements of the second phase, however, were never built.

Best Buy closed on March 4, 2023, and Flagstar Bank closed its Fairlane Green branch in 2025, Dearborn-based credit union DFCU Financial took over the building in December of that year, replacing a branch that was located at M-39 and Oakwood Boulevard. Around that time, the first Michigan branch of Navy Federal Credit Union opened in a space in front of The Home Depot.

On October 8, 2020, Electrify America announced that a DC Fast charging station was to be constructed within the Meijer parking lot. However, this was ultimately canceled with no public announcement. This would have been the first public DC fast charger in the "Downriver" area at that time. Meijer does offer four J1772 3kW chargers for use while shopping.

At the southernmost end, there is a planned 2.384 acre pad in the early planning stages.

As of May 2026, there are two unleased spaces in Phase II, not including the aforementioned pad development.

== Phase III ==
As of May 2026, the third phase, "Fairlane Green III", is under construction in the northwestern end of the property. This will bring the total number of entrances/exits to four. Traffic has long been a major point of frustration for visitors to Fairlane Green, especially during the busy holiday season.

== Phase IV ==
Located on the northeast end of the property, the fourth phase, "Fairlane Green IV", does not yet have any confirmed tenants. However, the original plans call for a nearly 100,000 square foot "big box" store with a gas station, and three additional business spaces. The latest plans have been modified to two buildings, one being 36,000 square and the other at 62,500 square foot, along with multiple smaller retail and drive thru buildings.

The main entrance/exit along Oakwood Boulevard will be expanded to include an additional exit lane, which will accommodate the increased traffic due to this development.

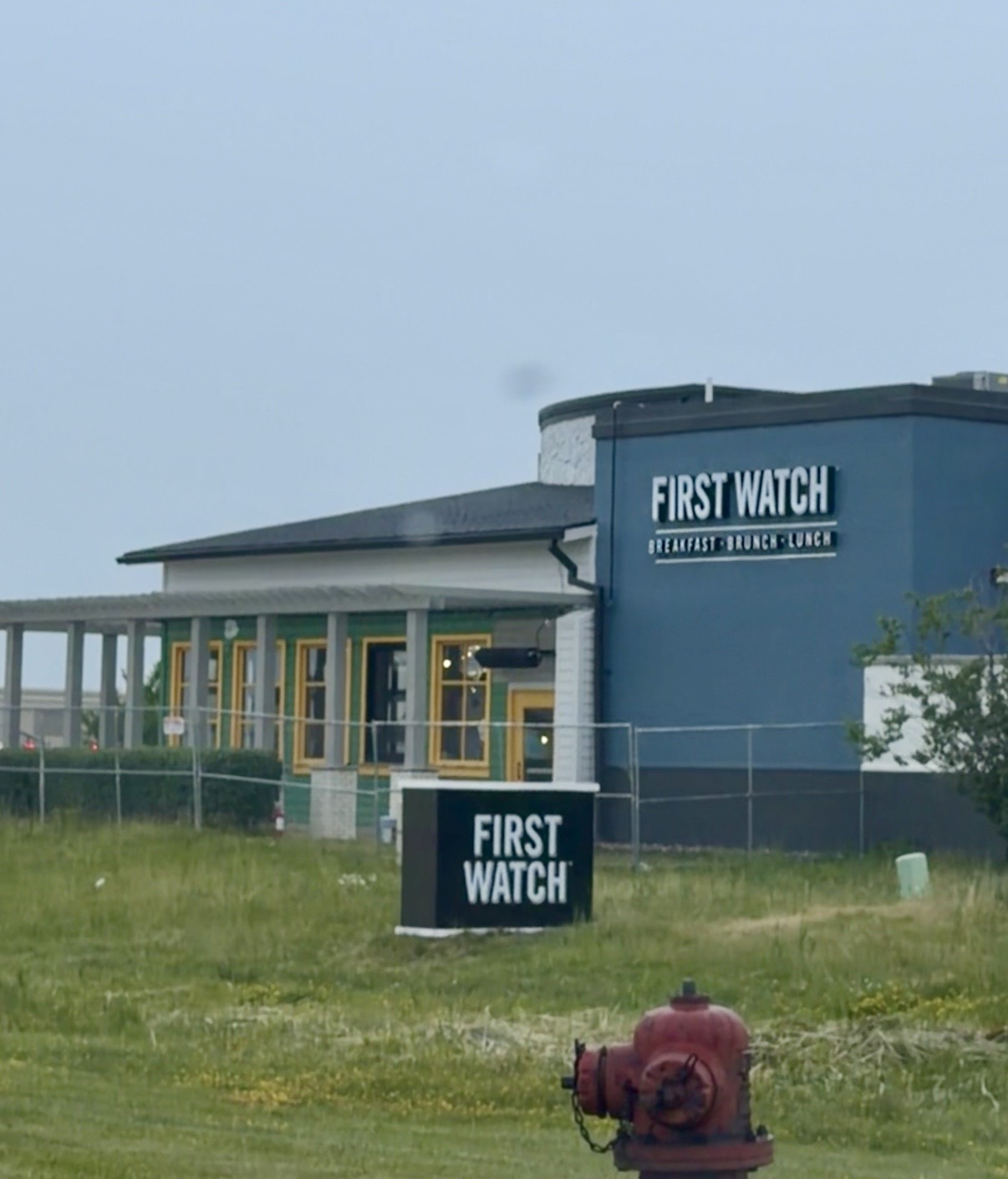
First Watch Allen Park Entrance June 2026
