= Celebration Cinema =

Movie theater in Western Michigan

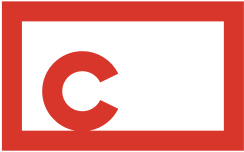
- Type: Private
- Founded: November 1, 1944; 81 years ago
- Founder: Jack Loeks
- Headquarters: 2121 Celebration Drive NE Grand Rapids, Michigan 49525
- Website: www.celebrationcinema.com

Celebration Cinema is an American movie theater chain owned and operated by Studio C (formerly known as Loeks Theatres, Inc.) with headquarters in Grand Rapids, Michigan. Its theaters serve the cities and surrounding areas of Grand Rapids, Lansing, Muskegon, Benton Harbor/St. Joseph, Portage/Kalamazoo, and Mount Pleasant. An average of 5.5 million customers see movies annually through Studio C's Celebration Cinemas locations. The Grand Rapids North and Portage locations have IMAX theaters, while the Lansing location has the chain's C Premium XL large-format auditorium.

== History ==
On November 1, 1944, Jack Loeks opened Foto News Theatre at the Midtown Theater at 123 Pearl Street in Grand Rapids, Michigan. In 1948, the Foto News Theatre was renamed to Midtown Theatre and Loeks opened the Beltline Drive-in in Wyoming, Michigan on 28th Street, a drive-in theater featuring a 90 ft (27 m)-tall screen.

A 1982 photograph of the Beltline Drive-In in Wyoming, Michigan, by John Margolies

Loeks opened the theater Studio 28, which was one of the first multiplex theaters, in 1965 on property adjacent to the Beltline Drive-in. In 1988, the Beltline Drive-in was demolished as Studio 28 expanded, becoming the largest multiplex in the United States, with 20 screens and 6,000 seats.

In 2007, Loeks Theatres, Inc. purchased two theaters from Plano, Texas-based Cinemark. The theaters are located in RiverTown Crossings in Grandville and the Woodland Mall in Kentwood. The 20-screen theater has been renamed Celebration Rivertown and the 14-screen theater has been renamed Celebration Woodland after their respective malls. The purchase was an effort of Loeks Theatres to continue expansion in the West Michigan area.

On November 14, 2008, Celebration Cinema announced that Studio 28 would close on November 23. At one point the theater brought in 1.7 million visitors per year. Before its closing, it had been about 25% of that amount.

In December 2012 the 6-screen Studio C! opened in Okemos. The theater features reserved seating, along with made-to-order food and drinks (including beer and wine) ordered and served from patron's seats. Celebration Cinema continued its expansion with the addition of enhanced food and beverage options at their Benton Harbor, Muskegon, Kalamazoo and Grand Rapids locations.

In 2018, Loeks Theatres, Inc changed their company name to Studio C. The name change is an effort to create a central brand name for all of its operations. The name is a homage to the former Studio 28 theater.

Studio C has constructed a new complex in downtown Grand Rapids called Studio Park. The complex features a 9-screen theater, parking garage, apartments and a shopping plaza. Studio Park broke ground in April 2018, with expected completion originally planned for Fall 2019. In reality, it was completed mid-2020.

In March 2020, Celebration Cinema closed its theaters temporarily due to the COVID-19 pandemic. In May 2020, it was announced Celebration Woodland would not reopen, citing declining traffic prior to the shutdown protocol. The Woodland location was later acquired by Phoenix Theatres.

In March 2025, Celebration Cinema announced that it would spend $5.8 million to renovate their RiverTown Crossings location, being the last remaining location in the Grand Rapids area to be renovated. Phase one of the renovation was completed in early July 2025, which included new 4K resolution laser projectors, Dolby Atmos speakers and heated recliner chairs in the auditorium, as well as updated decor in the hallways and bathrooms.

== Locations ==
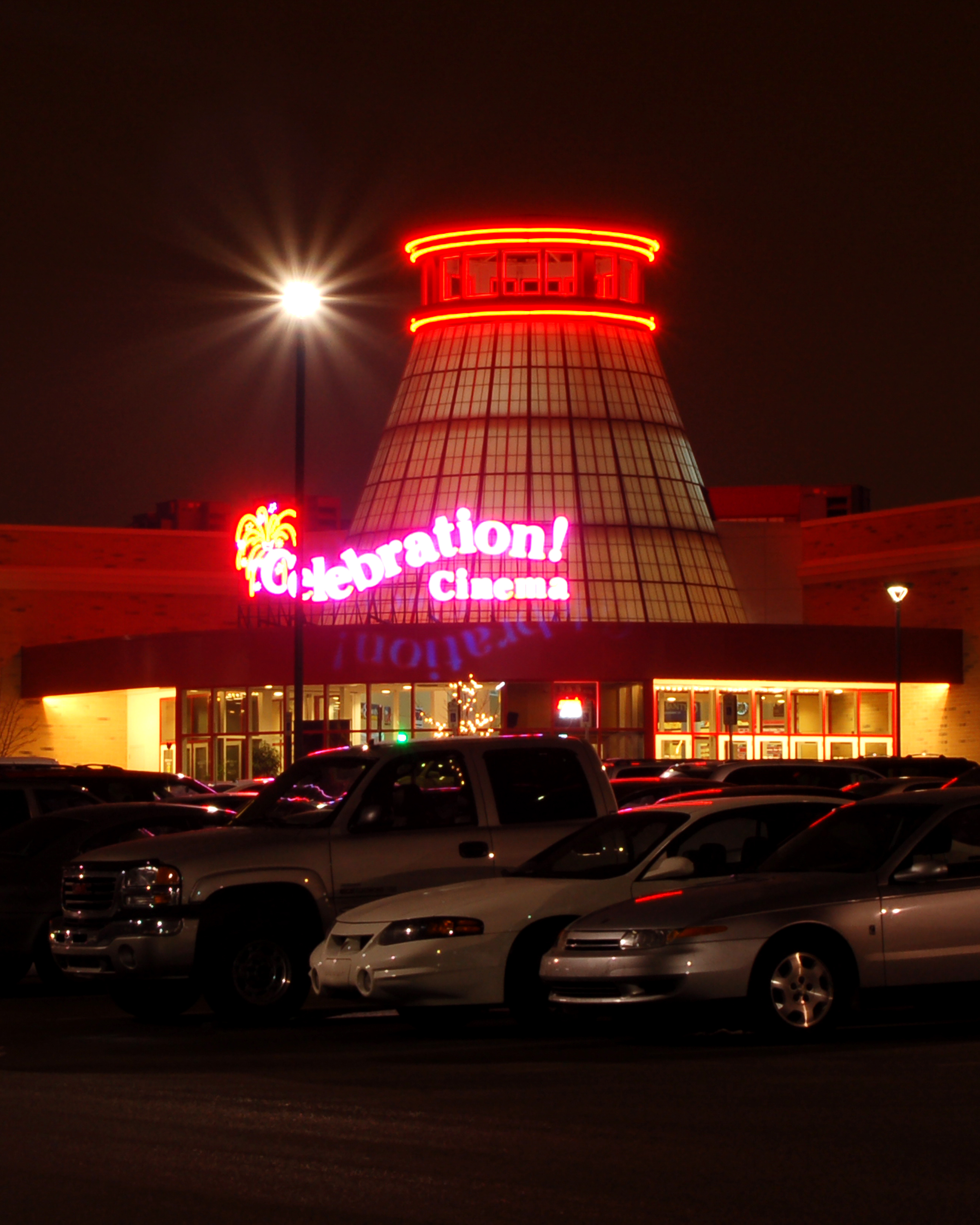
Celebration! Cinema South

As of 2026, Celebration Cinema operates 10 multiplex theaters and one drive-in theater.

Locations include:

- Benton Harbor, Michigan – 1 theater
- Grand Rapids, Michigan – 3 theaters
- Grandville, Michigan – 1 theater
- Lansing, Michigan – 1 theater
- Mount Pleasant, Michigan – 1 theater
- Muskegon, Michigan – 1 theater and 1 drive-in theater
- Okemos, Michigan – 1 theater
- Portage, Michigan – 1 theater

Studio C's corporate building is located in the Celebration North theater based in Grand Rapids, where three other Celebration theaters are also operated. RiverTown Crossings and Lansing feature MOPIX Rear Window Technology for the deaf and hard of hearing, and most locations feature DLP Digital cinema by Christie.

Celebration theaters in Grand Rapids and Portage have been fitted with IMAX theaters, with the Celebration North theater also being fitted with an IMAX 70mm film projector. The Lansing location has been fitted with the chain's C Premium XL large-format auditorium.
