= DFCU =

DFCU may refer to:

- DFCU Group, a Ugandan financial services company involved in retail banking, mortgage lending, development finance, leasing, as well as commercial real estate investments
- DFCU Bank, a commercial bank in Uganda; a subsidiary of DFCU Group
- Digital Federal Credit Union, a credit union in Massachusetts
- DFCU Financial, a credit union in Michigan
