= NASCAR Silicon Motor Speedway =

Mall of America
- Status: Closed
- Cost: $7.50 USD (1997)
- Opening date: September 3, 1997

Ride statistics
- Attraction type: Full motion sim racing
- Designer: LBE Technologies Inc.
- Riders per vehicle: 2
- Duration: 20 minutes
- Height restriction: 52 in (132 cm)

NASCAR Silicon Motor Speedway was a sim racing attraction based on a full motion platform that was designed by LBE Technologies Inc. and licensed by NASCAR. It was introduced in September 1997 at the Mall of America in Bloomington, Minnesota. In March 2010, the final owner of the then-named Silicon Motor Speedway filed for bankruptcy.

== History ==
=== Design and development ===
An idea of a simulated NASCAR experience happened when the sport was one of the fastest growing in popularity during the 1990s. The concept of the attraction was inspired by Planet Hollywood and Official All Star Café, with the idea of having celebrity endorsements to promote the experience.

The final design comprised a network of multiple replica NASCAR stock car models at 75% scale positioned on a full motion hydraulic frames – which simulated acceleration, driving on banked curves and collisions – that were lined in front of three screens that displayed a 3D simulation provided by projectors, providing a 130-degree view for drivers. The 3D graphics provided in the simulation were supplied by 3dfx's 3D Blaster Voodoo 2. Drivers could also modify the performance of their cars prior to each race as well, including simulated adjustments to tire pressure, weight distribution and other changes. Inside the cars, multi-channel 3D audio was provided to occupants by Creative Labs' Sound Blaster sound card as part of the 3D Blaster Voodoo 2 system, while virtual video mirrors provided sideview and rearview visual guidance for drivers. For operation, regular-sized gas, brake and shift pedals were used with a four-speed simulated transmission and occupants were required to used seatbelts. The steering wheel also included an interactive feedback system.

Each simulator cost $70,000, the equivalent to $136,793 in 2024. NASCAR racers provided some technical assistance with the simulation experience and some, including Jeff Gordon, became shareholders in LBE Technologies Inc. As for the target demographic, LBE Technologies Inc. focused on adults, with customers needing to be at least 52 inches tall to enter the attraction.

=== Introduction ===
On September 3, 1997, NASCAR Silicon Motor Speedway opened to the public at Mall of America in Bloomington, Minnesota. A total of 30 drivers, 12 human and 18 computer-controlled, were involved in a networked race. The price for one session, which lasted about 20 minutes, was $7.50, the equivalent to $15 in 2024. At the grand opening, NASCAR celebrities including Rusty Wallace, then-recent Indianapolis 500 winner Arie Luyendyk and Dale Earnhardt Jr., with the latter being unrecognized by many visitors. Earnhardt Jr. attended the event in place of his father Dale Earnhardt, who had recently had an unexplained medical event while racing in the 1997 Mountain Dew Southern 500 days earlier.

=== Expansion ===
External videos
- Promotional video of NASCAR Silicon Motor Speedway on YouTube

Shortly after its launch, weekend wait times for the attraction at Mall of America amounted to eight hours, operated at 85% of its capacity for two months and had over one million people visiting in one year. Following its success at the Mall of America, management suggested visitors to use a reservation system, with wait times at all locations dropping to three hours within a year. By 1998, five locations were open and an additional twelve locations were projected to open in both 1999 and 2000. NASCAR Silicon Motor Speedway was marketed as a way to have people spend more time at host locations and was targeted towards being installed in shopping malls, with the attraction be able to fit into a 6,000 sq ft (560 m^{2}) retail space. The attraction's popularity also included tournaments between racers that pooled up to $30,000 in prize cash, with the pro class champion winning $5,000, the veteran class prize being $2,500 and the rookie class prize being $1,250.

Opening date	Location	City	Notes
1997	Mall of America	Bloomington, Minnesota	
1998	Woodfield Mall	Schaumburg, Illinois	
1998	Galleria Dallas	Dallas, Texas	
1998	Irvine Spectrum Center	Irvine, California	
1998	Palisades Cente	West Nyack, New York	
1999	Arbor Place	Douglasville, Georgia	
1999	Concord Mills	Concord, North Carolina	
1999	Carousel Center Mall	Syracuse, New York	
1999	Katy Mills	Katy, Texas	
1999	Mall of Georgia	Buford, Georgia	
1999	RiverTown Crossings	Grandville, Michigan	
1999	Walden Galleria	Cheektowaga, New York	
2000	Crossgates Mall	Guilderland, New York	
2000	Opry Mills	Nashville, Tennessee	
2000	Peabody Place	Memphis, Tennessee	
2000	Riverchase Galleria	Hoover, Alabama	
2000	Universal Studios Hollywood	Universal City, California	
2003	NASCAR Speedpark Smoky Mountains	Sevierville, Tennessee	
2001	Daytona USA	Daytona Beach, Florida	
2003	Myrtle Beach Pavilion	Myrtle Beach, South Carolina	
2004	The Nextel Experience	Mobile trailers	
2004	Paul Bunyan's	Wisconsin Dells, Wisconsin	

=== Decline ===
By 2001, NASCAR Silicon Motor Speedway was located in only 12 locations compared to the 28 locations projected to open by 2000. LBE Technologies reported continuous annual loses of $2.6 million in 1997, $5.2 million in 1998 and $11.5 million. By March 2001, the locations at Arbor Place, Galleria Dallas, Irvine Spectrum Center and Walden Galleria closed. In April 2001, Silicon Entertainment Inc., who had acquired NASCAR Silicon Motor Speedway, filed for bankruptcy and its locations were closed. In September 2001, nine NASCAR Silicon Motor Speedway locations were acquired by Perfect Line LLC and reopened. A year later, Interactive Motorsports & Entertainment Corporation (IME) acquired Perfect Line in August 2002. In March 2010, Interactive Motorsports and Entertainment Corp., the final owner of Silicon Motor Speedway, filed for Chapter 11 Bankruptcy.

== Reception ==
Following the launch of NASCAR Silicon Motor Speedway, The Chicago Sun Times wrote it was "a rush...the next best thing to real NASCAR racing." Discussing the motion effects, Sports Illustrated said "Hit the wall or another car and the resulting spinout is genuinely harrowing" while Popular Science wrote "You feel every banked turn, hard shift and concrete wall you meet."
