= Star Theatres =

Star Theatres was an American movie theatre chain, initially owned and operated by Loeks Star Partners and Loews Cineplex Entertainment, and later by AMC Theatres.

Star Theatres was founded as a partnership between the sons of Jack Loeks, Jim and Barrie Loeks, and Columbia Pictures Entertainment, Inc., the company that owned Loews Theatres in the 1980s. The Loeks, who were based in Michigan before becoming co-CEOs of Sony Loews Theatres in 1992, designed and operated the Star Theatres chain. Based solely in Michigan, Star was known for having exceptional service, extravagant interior designs, many screens, and in some cases, stadium-style seating. The chain made the Summer 1990 Entertainment Weekly Honor Roll for movie theaters with the late Detroit Free Press critic Kathy Huffhines declaring, "IT'S FRIENDLY, kicky, and cute and looks like a bright red-and-white jukebox from the outside.". The slogan was "Love*Laugh*Live" and "Larger than Life".

The chain came to prominence in the late 1980s and early 1990s as more audiences chose to view films at a megaplex. Over time, some locations shut down or moved, while others thrived. The Southfield, Michigan and Auburn Hills, Michigan locations were considered the flagships of the chain and remained very popular with local movie-goers. The Loeks sold their 50% interest in the chain to Loews Cineplex Entertainment in 2002. The chain was subsequently sold to AMC Theatres in 2006 when Loews was purchased by AMC. The theaters were rebranded as AMC theatres in 2018. The Southfield location permanently closed in 2020, and the Fairlane Town Center location closed in 2022.

== Locations ==
=== Open ===
As of July 2026, the following theaters still operate following their acquisition:

- AMC Star Gratiot 15 - Clinton Township (opened May 1990, expanded to 21 screens by 1998 [as Star Gratiot 21], downsized to 15 screens 2018)
- AMC Holland 8 - Holland (opened 1989)
- AMC Grand Rapids 18 - Grand Rapids (opened 1992 as Star Grand Rapids 18)
- AMC Star Great Lakes 25 - Great Lakes Crossing Outlets, Auburn Hills (opened April 1999)
- Emagine Rochester Hills 10 - Rochester Hills (opened October 1989, closed and sold 2010, remodeled into a location of an Emagine theatre)
- AMC John R 15 - Madison Heights (opened December 1989 as Star John R 15)

=== Closed ===
- AMC Star Southfield 20 - Southfield (opened June 1997, closed 2020)
- Star Lincoln Park 8 - Lincoln Park Shopping Center, Lincoln Park (opened May 1988, closed 2003, demolished 2018)
- AMC Fairlane 21 - Fairlane Town Center, Dearborn (opened May 2000 as Star Fairlane 21, closed 2022)
- Star Taylor 10 - Taylor (opened October 1989, closed 2009, reopened 2010 as Spotlight Theaters Taylor 10, Spotlight Theaters Taylor 10 closed 2012)
- Star Winchester - Winchester Mall, Rochester Hills (opened 1985, closed 1999, rebuilt into a strip mall)
