= Silver Line (Grand Rapids) =

Bus rapid transit route in Grand Rapids, Michigan, United States

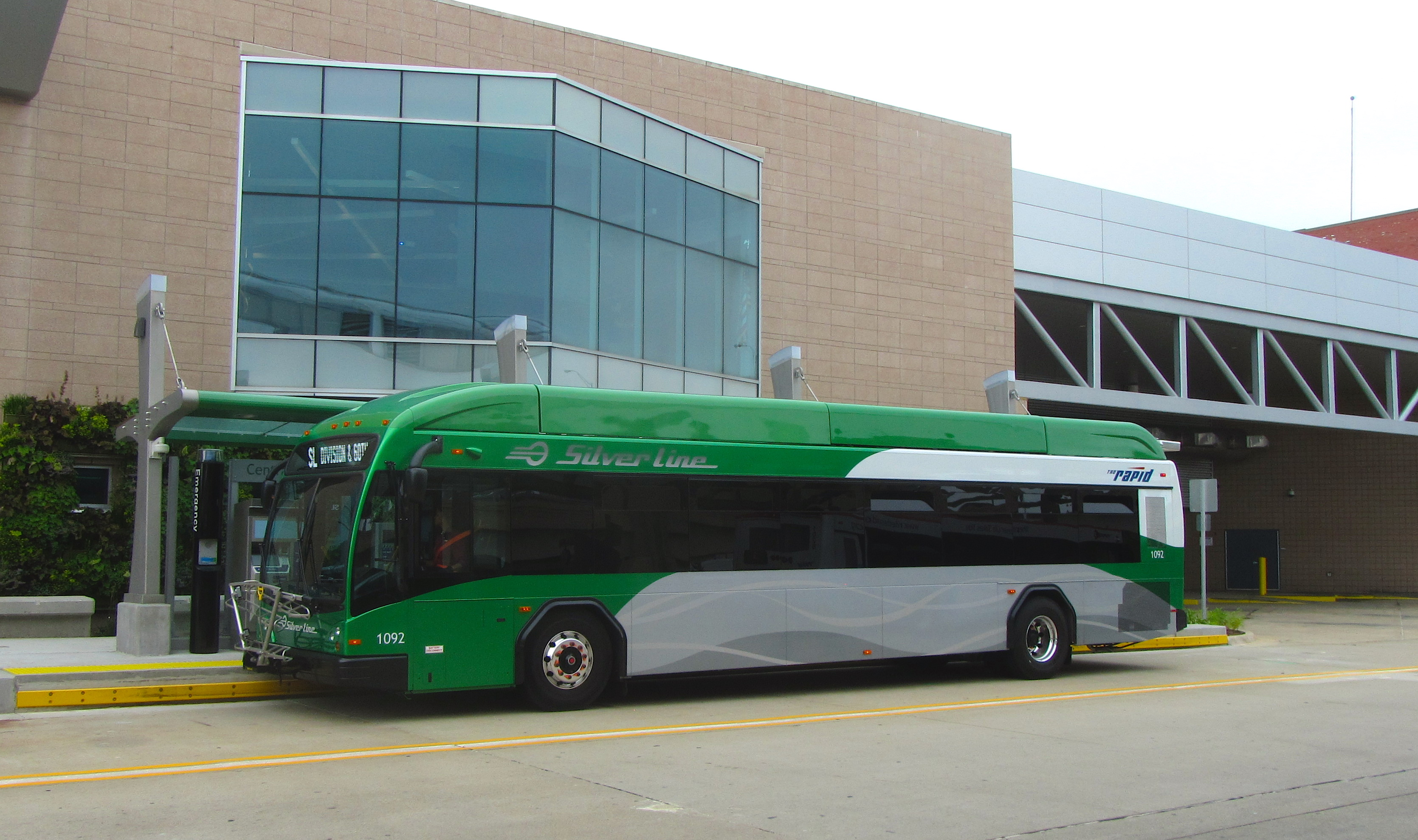
- Silver Line bus at Rapid Central Station, the northern terminus

Overview
- Operator: The Rapid
- Status: Operating
- Began service: August 25, 2014

Route
- Route type: Bus rapid transit
- Locale: Grand Rapids, Michigan
- Start: 60th Street Station
- End: Rapid Central Station
- Length: 9.6 mi (15 km)
- Stations: 34
- Annual patronage: 421,150 (with Laker Line)

The Silver Line is a bus rapid transit line operated by The Rapid in Grand Rapids, Michigan, United States. The line runs along Division Avenue on the Wyoming-Kentwood border into downtown Grand Rapids, where it loops around before terminating at Rapid Central Station. It began operation on August 25, 2014.

The route is part of The Rapid transit network in the Grand Rapids metro area. It is the first BRT service in the state of Michigan.

There are 34 stations including the terminus platform at Central Station. Each station is equipped with 24-hour lighting, an emergency phone, and a snow melt system under the platform. An illuminated text display informs passengers of expected arrival times. All stations have raised platforms that align with the floor of the rapid transit vehicle, making for easy boarding and alighting.

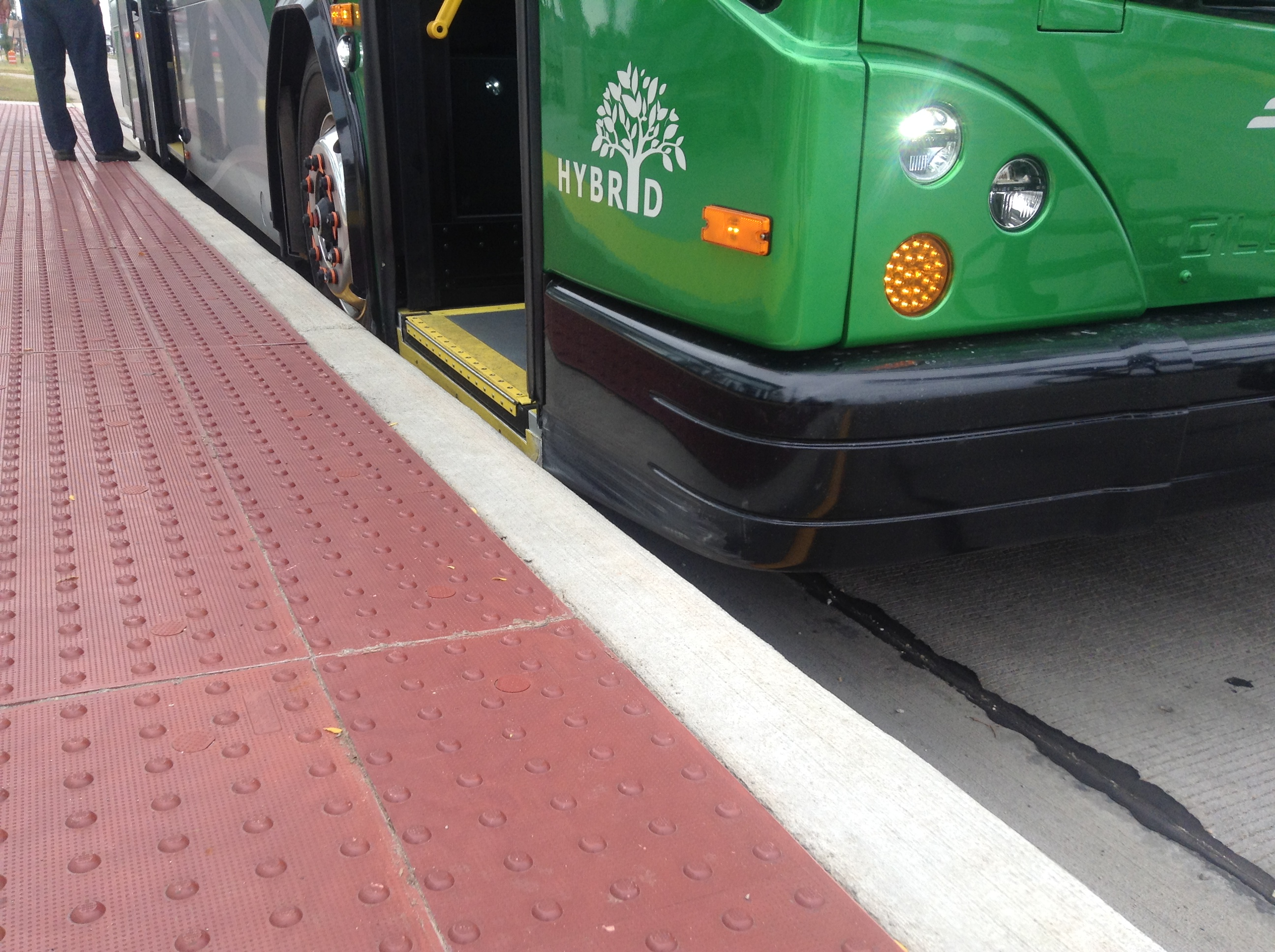
Level boarding of bus rapid transit demonstrated

== Route ==
The Silver Line route travels 9.6 miles (15 km), mostly along Division Avenue from 60th Street on the Wyoming-Kentwood border, crossing into the City of Grand Rapids at 28th Street, and after Wealthy Street loops around the downtown area to Central Station in Grand Rapids.

Between 28th Street and Wealthy Street, Division Avenue has two sign-designated "bus only" lanes which are reserved during weekday peak hours, reducing delays due to conflicts with general traffic during busy times. There are also bus lanes on Monroe Avenue.

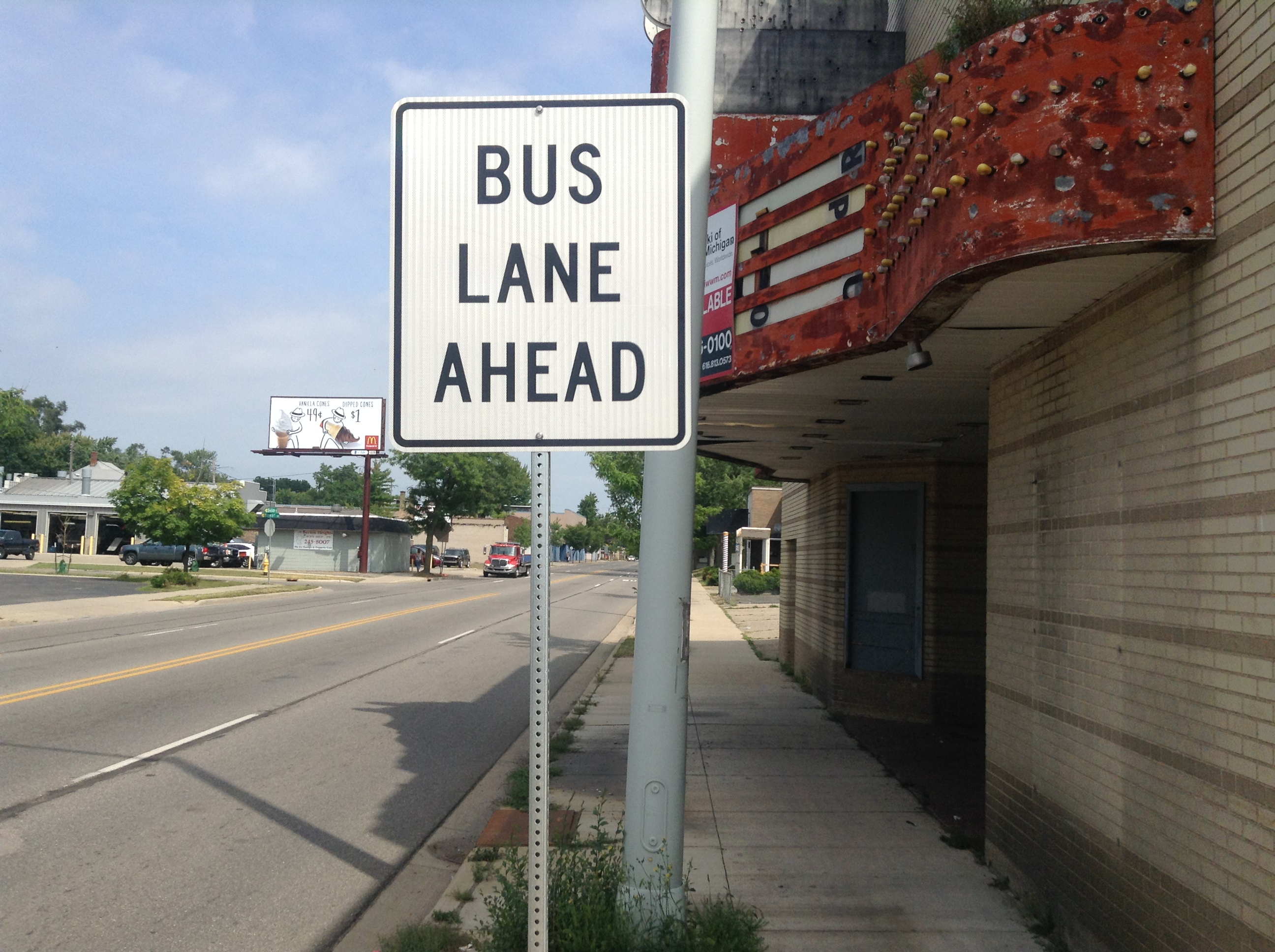
Bus Lane Ahead sign on Division Avenue

The route also necessitated the introduction of the city's first transit-only traffic signal, at the intersection of Fulton Street and Ransom Avenue. This light assists the southbound Silver Line bus to turn left from its right lane position. Regular traffic is funneled into a single lane regardless of which direction they wish to turn.

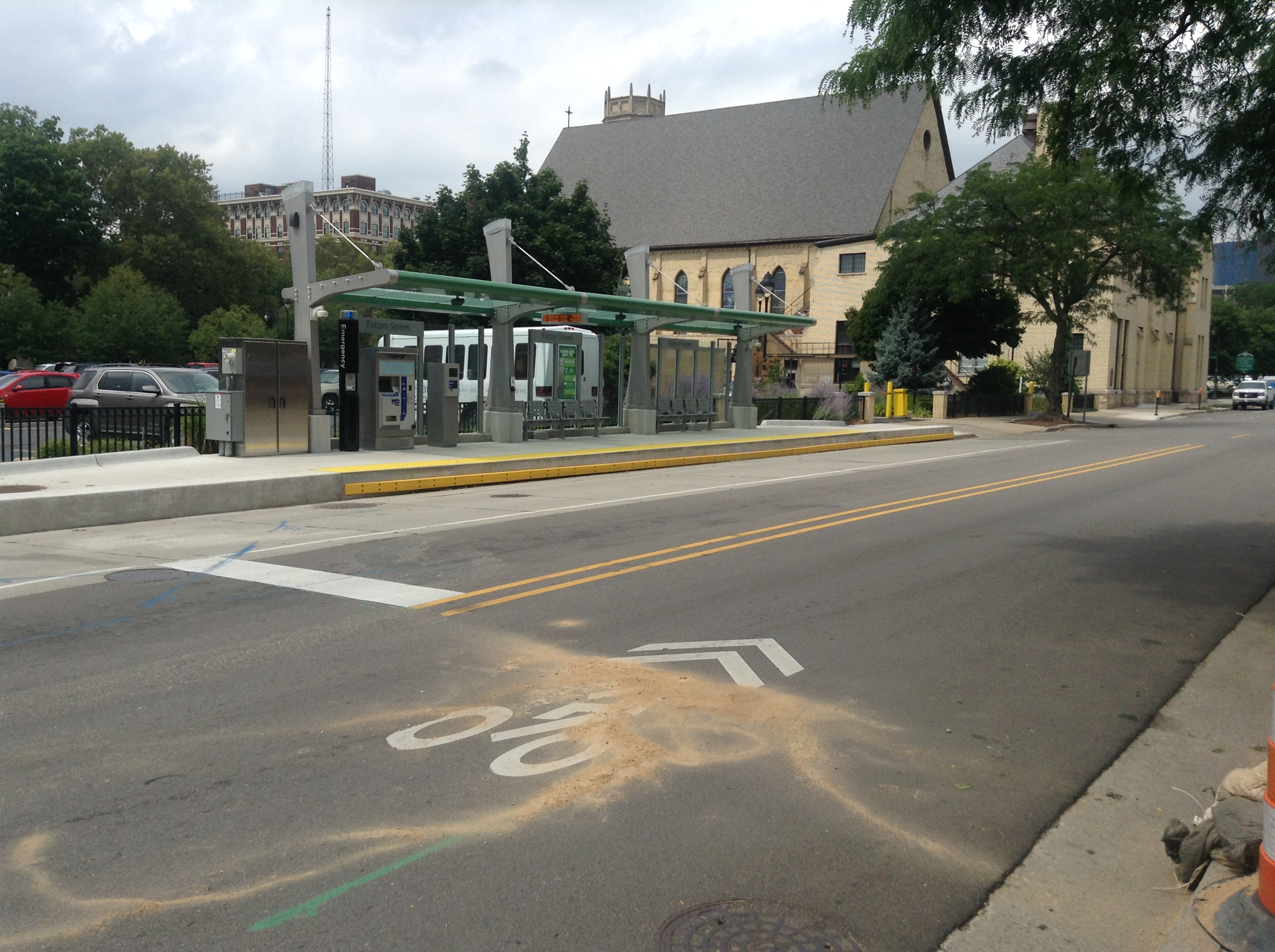
View of the southbound station, located on Ransom Avenue. The bus turns left from the right lane with the aid of a dedicated signal. General traffic uses the left lane to turn right or left.

A parking lot was created at the southern terminus at 60th Street and Division, and acts as a Park'n'Ride facility. Parking at the facility is free.

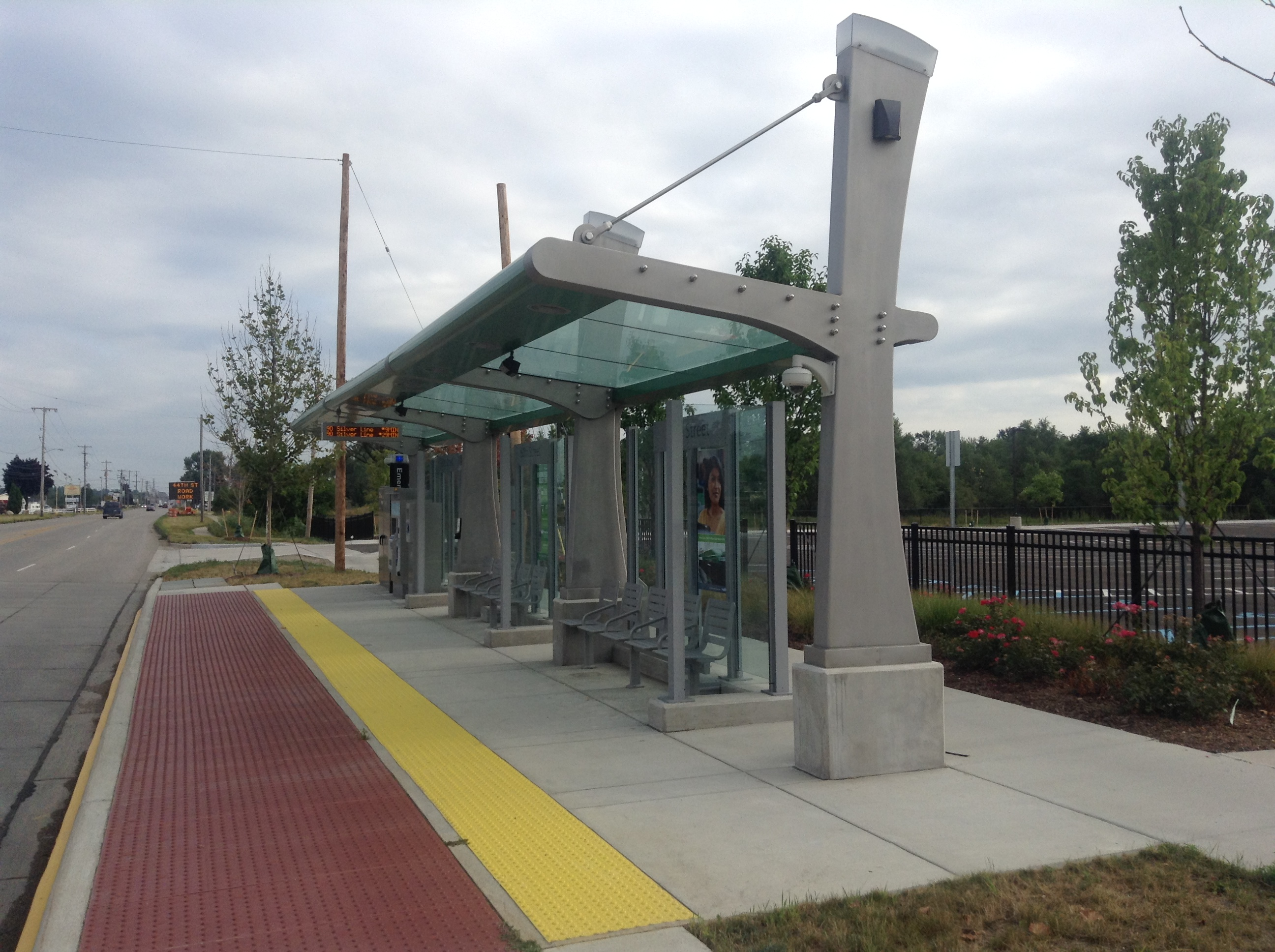
Park'n'Ride lot visible to the right.

== Fares ==
The fare structure is integrated with the rest of the Rapid bus network. A single fare costs $1.75, with a daily cap of $5.25. Weekly and monthly passes as well as 10-ride passes are available. Unlike on the regular bus services, fares were paid or validated prior to boarding. Off-board fare payment was discontinued in 2022.

On September 1, 2016, the service was made fare-free in the downtown area between Central Station and Wealthy Street. Rides originating or with destination south of Wealthy Street were subject to payment. The “fare-free zone” was discontinued on August 1, 2020.

== Schedule ==
The Silver Line provides service 7 days a week, during similar hours to the rest of the Rapid network.

Weekdays (Monday–Friday)
Northbound		Southbound	
5:32 AM–6:21 AM	Every 20–30 minutes	5:40 AM–6:40 PM	Every 15 minutes
6:21 AM–6:50 PM	Every 15 minutes	5:40 AM–6:40 PM	Every 15 minutes
6:50 PM–9:50 PM	Every 30 minutes	6:40 PM–10:10 PM	Every 30 minutes
Saturdays
Northbound		Southbound	
5:38 AM–9:10 PM	Every 30 minutes	6:00 AM–9:30 PM	Every 30 minutes
Sundays
Northbound		Southbound	
6:10 AM–6:10 PM	Every 30 minutes	7:00 AM–6:30 PM	Every 30 minutes

== Map ==
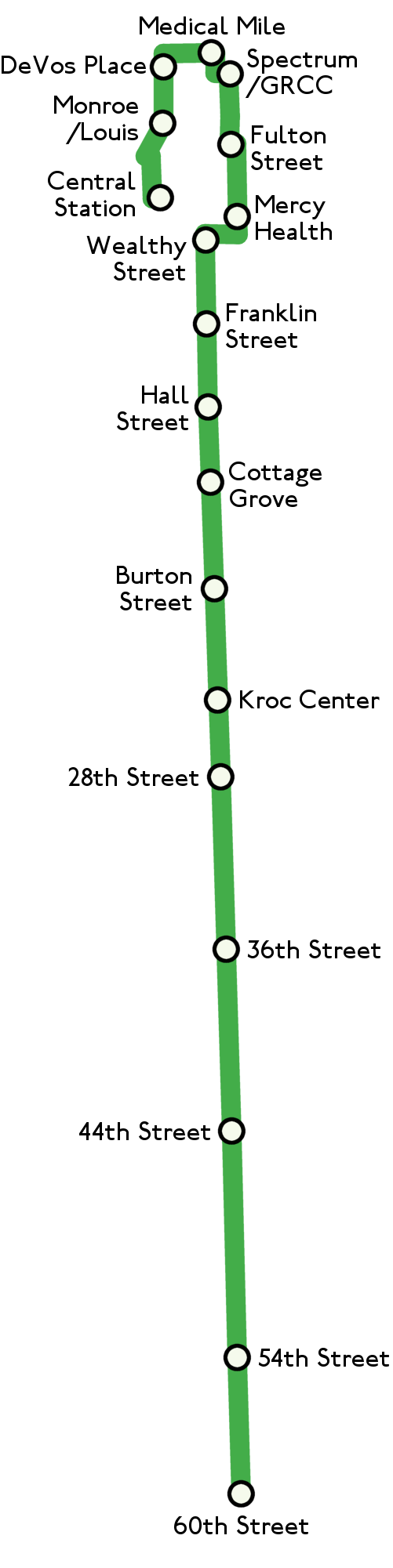
Geographically accurate map of the Silver Line

== See also ==
- The Rapid
- Laker Line
- List of bus rapid transit systems
