= Kahunaville =

Defunct tiki-themed restaurant chain

- Industry: Restaurants
- Founded: 1996, Wilmington, Delaware
- Founder: David Tuttleman
- Defunct: 2008; 18 years ago (South Korea); 2016; 10 years ago (United States)
- Number of locations: 12 in the United States, 3 in South Korea (2003)
- Area served: South Korea; United States
- Revenue: $48 million (2001)
- Number of employees: 3,000 (2001)
- Parent: Adventure Dining Inc.
- Website: kahunaville.com (archived)

Kahunaville was a tropical themed restaurant chain founded in 1996 by David Tuttleman in Wilmington, Delaware and owned by Adventure Dining Inc. In the late 1990s, the chain became established in shopping malls throughout the United States and by 2002, it employed 3,000 employees, had an annual revenue of $48 million, the equivalent to $90,390,731 in 2024 and expanded internationally to South Korea. In November 2006, the original Kahunaville was closed suddenly by Tuttleman following the death of his father and two years later, its locations in South Korea shuttered. The final Kahunaville location in Las Vegas was closed in 2016. Since its closing, reunion events have been organized and held by Tuttleman to commemorate the history of Kahunaville.

== History ==
=== Big Kahuna ===
The Daniel S. Frawley Stadium, then the Legends Stadium, opened in 1993 as part of a revitalization effort of the Riverfront neighborhood of Wilmington, Delaware. As part of this effort, David Tuttleman, the son of Philadelphia-based clothing maker Stanley Tuttleman, opened the Big Kahuna club in 1994 in a 35,000-square-foot (3,300 m^{2}) abandoned warehouse at 500 South Madison Street. The theme for Big Kahuna was based from Tuttleman's travel with his family to tropical locations such as Hong Kong, Sri Lanka and the South Pacific, with the club's interior featuring huts, palm trees, surfboards and waterfalls. The club targeted demographics aged between 21 and 30, quickly becoming popular in the area.

=== Restaurants ===
In an effort to expand customer demographics, Kahunaville, a restaurant that could seat 220 people and featured a deck overlooking the Christina River, opened in 1996. A 65-foot (20 m) volcano sculpture constructed from foam over a steel body stood outside Kahunaville, emitting smoke that had its visual presentation enhanced by light fixtures. During the day, the location was family-friendly and featured billiards and arcade games, though at night the restaurant became more adult-themed and occasionally had women dancing on the bars. Tuttleman described the original Wilmington location that held 6,000 people as "the biggest, baddest nightclub in the Mid-Atlantic region", with Kahunaville featuring numerous musical acts such as Aaron Carter, Bob Dylan, George Thorogood, Green Day, KC and the Sunshine Band, Kanye West, the Moody Blues, REO Speedwagon, Sugar Ray, Third Eye Blind, Uncle Kracker, Vertical Horizon and Wide Spread Panic.

In 1997, Kahunaville opened its second location in Langhorne Borough, Pennsylvania at the Oxford Valley Mall. The Oxford Valley project happened after a failed initiative in Harrisburg, Pennsylvania to build a large restaurant and entertainment facility on City Island. Two more locations opened at the Eastwood Mall in Niles, Ohio and the Carousel Center (now known as Destiny USA) in Syracuse, New York in 1998. An additional three locations were opened in 1999 at Holyoke Mall in Holyoke, Massachusetts, Walden Galleria in Buffalo, New York and RiverTown Crossings in Grandville, Michigan. The Walden Galleria location in Buffalo had an estimated investment cost of $5 million, equivalent to $9,415,701 in 2024.

In August 2001, Kahunaville opened at Treasure Island Hotel and Casino in Las Vegas and a month later, a location opened at the International Plaza and Bay Street in Tampa, Florida on September 14, 2001 with little traffic at the mall following the recent September 11 attacks. A location was opened in February 2002 at Jersey Gardens Mall in Elizabeth, New Jersey. Other locations were at the Kalahari Resort in Wisconsin Dells, Wisconsin. A Kahunaville location was planned to open in 2002 with the new Festival Bay Mall in Orlando, Florida, though this did not occur.

Kahunaville expanded internationally in 2002, opening a location in Seoul, South Korea at the Savoy Hotel in September and a second location later that year. A third location in Seoul opened in 2003.

=== Closing ===
By the mid 2000s, Tuttleman was a caretaker for his father, who had prostate cancer. In 2004, Kahunaville closed its locations in Buffalo, Holyoke, Grandville and Tampa. The Syracuse location closed in 2005. In November 2006, following the death of his father, Tuttleman closed the original Kahunaville location in Wilmington, Delaware. The Eastwood Mall Kahunaville closed in March 2007.

The Korea Times said that the restaurant was the eighth most popular family restaurant chain in South Korea, competing with Bennigan's, Hooters, Outback Steakhouse, Sizzler, TGI Fridays and Tony Roma's. In 2008, Kahunaville ceased operations in South Korea.

In 2013, the location in Wisconsin Dells closed. The last Kahunaville at Treasure Island Hotel and Casino in Las Vegas closed in 2016, hosting one last party for Super Bowl 50.

=== Reunion events ===
The first reunion event for the original Kahunaville occurred in 2013 in Prices Corner, Delaware. In April 2018, Tuttleman and Sam Adams, a promoter, hosted a Kahunaville reunion event, commemorating Michael Carroll, a graphic artist for Kahunaville who died in February that year. Adams said that he and Carroll pushed the idea of a reunion to Tuttleman in order to encourage him to enter into the entertainment business once more. Tuttleman, who has his own foundation, responded saying "This sounds really corny, but we all have a certain amount of time on this earth and you make the best of it, ... In my time, I chose to spend it creating great entertainment. But I had my chance at the wheel and it was amazing." The event raised over $10,000, the equivalent to $18,831 in 2024, for charities in the Wilmington community.

== Reception ==
Following its closure, Kahunaville was listed in multiple articles where it had locations, with individuals reported missing the restaurant and wishing for its return.

In 2016, The Post-Standard listed Kahunaville in the article "Syracuse restaurants we wish we had back". The restaurant was listed in "The Saddest Restaurant Closings in Las Vegas in 2016" article by Eater. In the 2018 MassLive article "Massachusetts restaurants we miss", Kahunaville was "remembered for cheesy atmosphere and birthday songs." New Jersey radio station WPST listed Kahunaville in its "10 Local Restaurants We Miss The Most" article in 2019. Grand Rapids radio station WLHT-FM had Kahunaville present on its list of restaurants locals wanted to see return.

=== Awards ===
- 1998: Nation's Restaurant News' Hot Concept of the Year Award
- 2000: Restaurant Hospitality's Rising Star Award
- 2001: Restaurant Hospitality's Richard Melman Concepts of Tomorrow Award

== See also ==
- Rainforest Cafe
