= The Rapid =

Public transit system in Grand Rapids, Michigan, United States

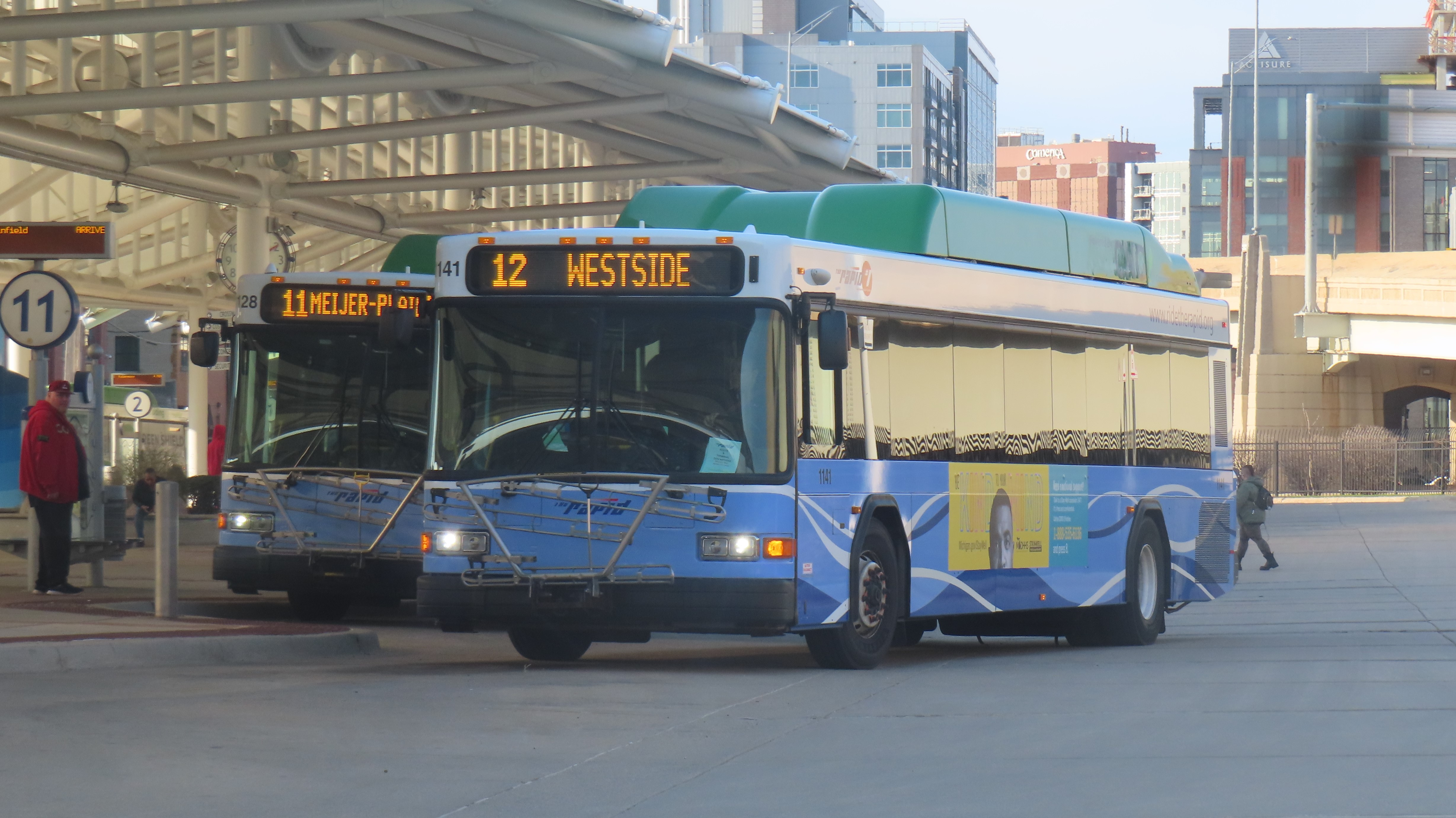
- The Rapid buses at Rapid Central Station
- Founded: 1963; 2000 (as The Rapid)
- Headquarters: 300 Ellsworth Avenue SW
- Locale: Grand Rapids, Michigan
- Service type: Bus service Bus rapid transit (BRT); Paratransit
- Routes: 23
- Hubs: Rapid Central Station; Woodland Mall
- Fleet: 166
- Daily ridership: 24,200 (weekdays, Q1 2026)
- Annual ridership: 6,538,100 (2025)
- Fuel type: Diesel; CNG
- Chief executive: Deborah Prato
- Website: ridetherapid.org

The Rapid is the public transit operator serving Grand Rapids, Michigan and its surrounding suburbs. The Rapid operates local bus service in urban areas in Kent County, and regional service to Ferris State University and Grand Valley State University in Mecosta and Ottawa Counties, respectively.

The Rapid is the marketing name of the Interurban Transit Partnership, a special district that covers 6 cities in Kent County. The Interurban Transit Partnership collects property taxes in the 6 member cities to fund its core services, and maintains contracts with 3 additional municipalities and 2 universities for additional services. The Rapid operates 23 bus routes, and also provides paratransit and carpool coordination services. In 2025, the system had a ridership of 6,538,100, or about 24,200 per weekday.

== History ==
=== GRTA ===
Formed by the City of Grand Rapids in 1963 as the Grand Rapids Transit Authority, the system became a regional authority in July 1978 and was renamed the Grand Rapids Area Transit Authority (GRATA).

=== As The Rapid ===
In January 2000, GRATA reorganized as the Interurban Transit Partnership, an organization formed by the City of Grand Rapids and five suburban communities; the agency soon adopted "The Rapid" as its branding.

The Rapid Central Station, the system's main transit center in downtown Grand Rapids, opened in June 2004. The station, whose main platform incorporates a Teflon fabric roof, was the first LEED-certified transit facility in the United States. That year, the system received the "Outstanding Public Transportation System" award from the American Public Transportation Association. It would go on to win the award again in 2013.

The Rapid ended the sale of paper tickets and passes online, at Rapid Central Station, and on buses in November 2019.

In August 2022, Byron Township ended its service agreement with The Rapid. Following the contract's termination, all stops in Byron Township were discontinued, with route 10 running nonstop through Byron Township to its destination in Gaines Township. The following October, Transdev began to operate The Rapid's paratransit services under contract.

In August 2023, after failed negotiations between Cascade Township and The Rapid, service on Route 29 was cancelled. Route 28 was extended to cover a small part of the service area of Route 29 within the city of Kentwood.

==== BRT projects ====
In May 2009, voters in The Rapid's member communities rejected a millage increase, which included early plans for a bus rapid transit line on Division Avenue, to be called the Silver Line. A similar increase was approved, by a narrow margin of 136 votes, in May 2011. The BRT project, Michigan's first, had a $40 million budget, of which $32 million was covered by federal grants; the rest was to be funded by MDOT. Work commenced in April 2013, and was completed in mid-2014, $3 million under budget. The completed Silver Line opened for service on August 25, 2014.

While the Silver Line was under construction, The Rapid commissioned a study in 2013 to explore the feasibility of a second BRT line, connecting the downtown Grand Rapids campus of Grand Valley State University with its main campus in Allendale. This BRT line was a long-term goal of The Rapid management; the study was prompted, however, by overcrowding on route 50, an existing route serving GVSU. Route 50 later changed its routing in August 2015 to follow the path of the proposed BRT corridor. $57 million in federal grant funding was approved for the line in 2016, with MDOT covering the remaining $14 million. Construction began in 2019, and the Laker Line began passenger service on August 24, 2020.

== Service area ==
The Rapid's main service area consists of its six member cities, whose property taxes fund the system: Grand Rapids, East Grand Rapids, Grandville, Kentwood, Walker, and Wyoming. Select routes also service Alpine Township, Cascade Township, Gaines Township, Grand Valley State University, and Ferris State University, which fund said services under contract with The Rapid.

== Services ==
=== Bus rapid transit ===
The Rapid operates Michigan's only two bus rapid transit (BRT) lines: the Silver Line and Laker Line.

==== Silver Line ====
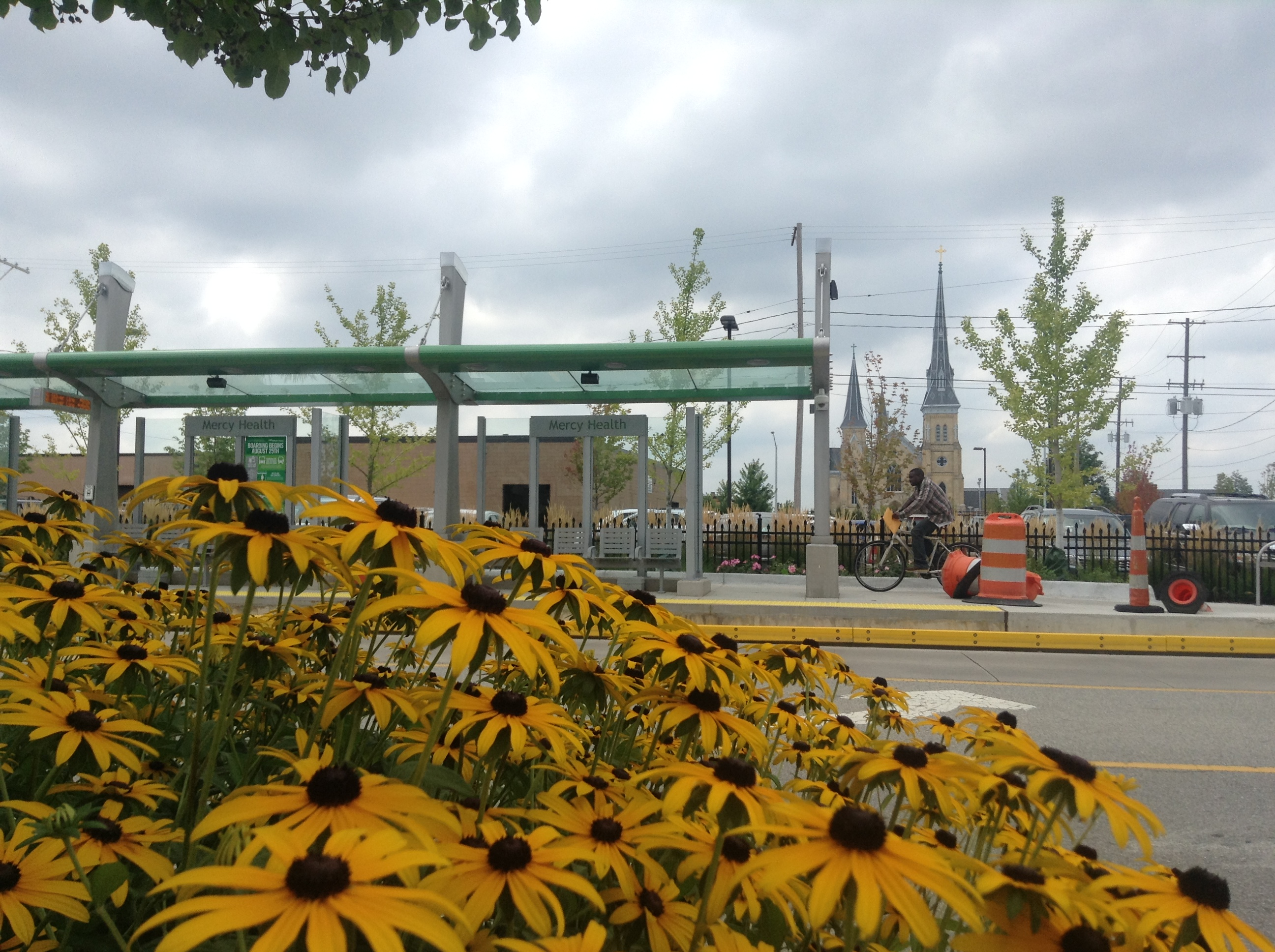
View of southbound Mercy Health Silver Line station across Jefferson Avenue, with Cathedral of St Andrew in the background.

The Silver Line is a 9.1-mile (14.6 km) BRT line along Division Avenue, connecting downtown Grand Rapids with Wyoming and Kentwood. The line, which runs every 15 minutes on weekdays and every 30 minutes on weekends, is operated with a fleet of ten diesel-electric hybrid Gillig BRT buses. It previously had ticket machines and farecard readers on station platforms, before off-board fare collection was discontinued on the line in 2022.

==== Laker Line ====
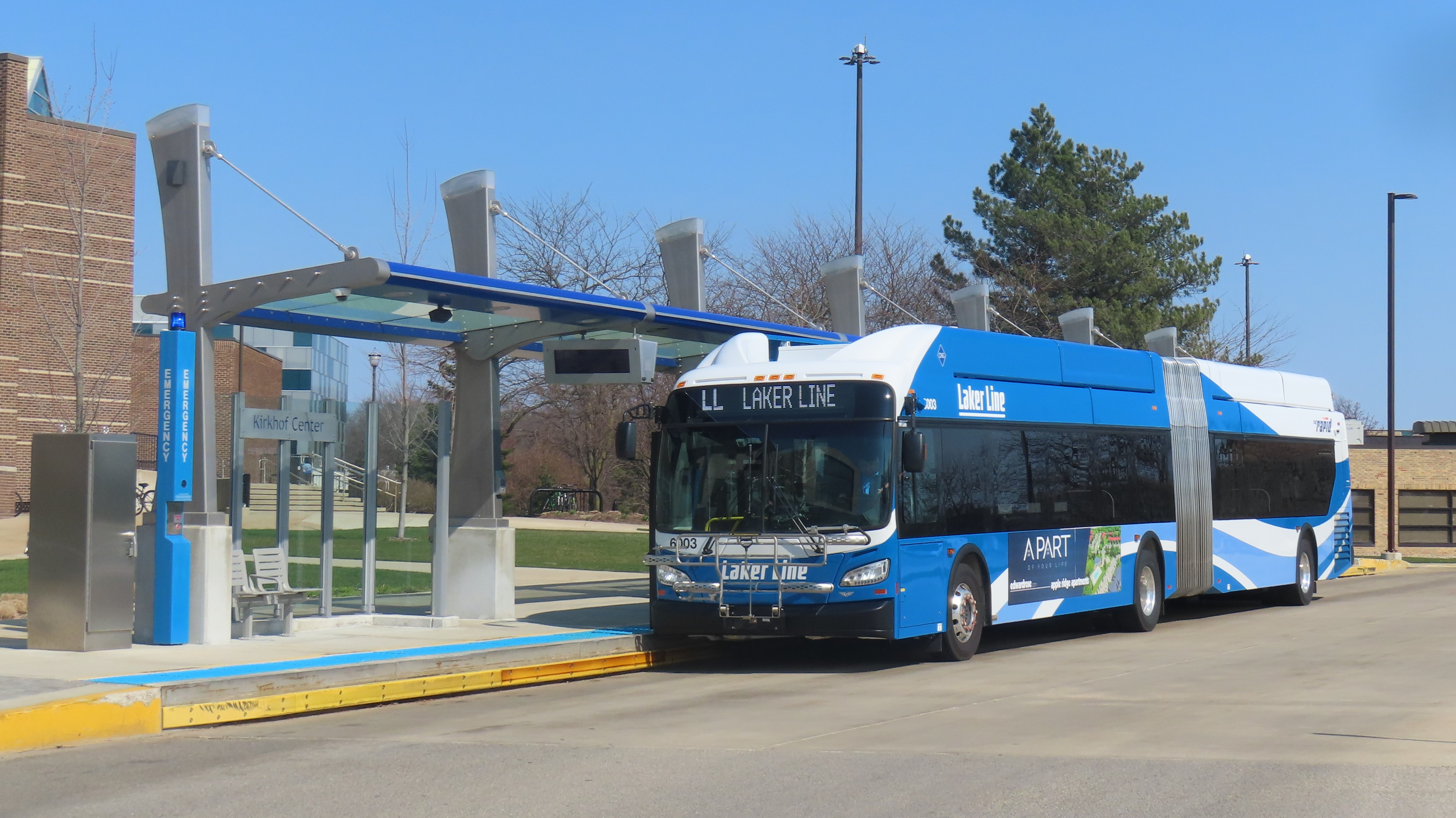
Laker Line at Grand Valley State University

The Laker Line is a 13.1-mile (21.1 km) BRT line connecting downtown Grand Rapids with the main campus of Grand Valley State University in Allendale. The line, which primarily runs along Lake Michigan Drive, has 12 stops in Grand Rapids and Walker and two at GVSU; no stops are made between GVSU's campus and the Kent-Ottawa county line. The route serves GVSU's Pew campus in downtown Grand Rapids, the Medical Mile, and the John Ball Zoological Garden. Inbound buses stop at Pew Campus before proceeding into downtown, then double back to terminate at Pew.

With 10-minute headways on weekdays during the fall and spring semesters (during the summer, it runs every 15 minutes), the Laker Line is the most frequent route in The Rapid's network; it is also the only route operated using articulated buses, with a fleet of sixteen CNG-powered New Flyer XN60 vehicles. Ticket machines and farecard readers are located on each station's platform.

=== Conventional buses ===
The Rapid operates 23 fixed bus routes, and special services for Grand Valley State University, Grand Rapids Community College and Ferris State University (see below).

Routes 1 through 15, along with the Silver Line BRT, begin at Rapid Central Station.

Most buses operate seven days a week. Routes 3, 5, 13, 14, and 24 do not operate on Sundays. Routes 27 and 33 only run on weekdays, Weekday service is from around 4.30-6am until after 11pm or midnight. Saturday service is between around 6 a.m. - 9 p.m., Sundays are between around 7 a.m. - 6 p.m.

To aid scheduling, some routes "interline". This means that a specific vehicle will serve multiple routes as part of its scheduled run by that driver. For example, on weekdays, route 7 arrives at Central Station and continues as the 15.

The Rapid bus routes (as of April 2023)
				Frequency (min)			
#	Route	Termini		Mon-Fri	Sat	Sun	Notes
LL	Laker Line	Grand Valley State University	Grand Valley State University Pew Campus	10	30	30	Internally route 45.
SL	Silver Line	60th Street Park & Ride	Central Station	15-30	30	30	Local service (Wealthy-54th) provided by Route 1. Internally route 90.
1	Division/Madison	54th St. Meijer	Central Station	30	30	30	
2	Kalamazoo	Kentwood City Hall	Central Station	15-30	30-60	30	15-minute service only to 28th Street Meijer; Interlined with Route 9 on Saturdays
3	Wyoming/Rivertown	Hope Network	Central Station	30-60	60	-	
4	Eastern	Gaines Township Meijer	Central Station	15-30	30-60	60	15-minute service only to 28th Street; Interlined with Route 6 on Saturdays and Route 9 on Sundays
5	Wealthy	Woodland Mall (Kentwood Station); Peak extension to 33rd/Patterson	Central Station	15-60	60	-	15-minute service only to Breton Village; Interlined with Routes 7 & 15 on Saturdays
6	Eastown	Woodland Mall (Kentwood Station)	Central Station	15-30	30-60	60	Interlined with Route 44 on weekdays, and 4 on Saturdays
7	West Leonard	Standale Meijer	Central Station	15-60	60	60	Interlined with Route 15 on weekdays, and 15 & 5 on Saturdays
8	Prairie/Rivertown	RiverTown Meijer	Central Station	15-60	60	60	15-minute service only to Goodwill
9	Alpine	Alpine Walmart	Central Station	15-30	30-60	60	15-minute service only to Greenridge Mall. Interlined with Route 2 on Saturdays and Route 4 on Sundays.
10	Clyde Park	54th St. Meijer	Central Station	30-60	60	60	
11	Plainfield	Plainfield/Elmdale	Central Station	15-30	60	60	
12	West Fulton	Standale Meijer	Central Station	30-60	60	60	Interlined with Route 13 during Weekday mid-day
13	Michigan/Fuller	Michigan Veterans Facility	Central Station	30-60	60	-	Shares 15-minute peak service along Michigan with route 19; Interlined occasionally with Route 12
14	East Fulton	Leonard/Ball	Central Station	30-60	60	-	
15	East Leonard	Knapp's Corner	Central Station	15-60	60	60	Interlined with Route 7 on weekdays and Routes 5 & 7 on Saturdays
24	Burton	RiverTown Crossings	Woodland Mall (Kentwood Station)	30-60	60	-	Interlined with Route 27 on weekdays
27	Airport Industrial	Woodland Mall (Kentwood Station)	Gerald Ford Airport (Cascade Township)	30-60	-	-	Interlined with Route 24
28	28th	Fairlanes/Visser YMCA	Woodland Mall (Kentwood Station)	18	30-60	60	
33	Walker Industrial	Northridge	Greenridge Mall	60	-	-	Peak hour only
37	GVSU North Campus	Kirkhof Center	48th/Lake Michigan Drive	7	-	-	Runs only when classes are in session; covered by #85 on weekends
44	44th Street	Rivertown Walmart	Woodland Mall (Kentwood Station)	30-60	60	60	
48	GVSU South	Kirkhof Center	48th/Pierce	4	-	-	Runs only when classes are in session; covered by #85 on weekends
51	DASH Clockwise	Loop from Central Station		15			Free
52	DASH Counterclockwise	Loop from Central Station		15			Free
55	DASH Work	Clockwise loop from Pearl + Ottawa		15	-	-	Free
85	GVSU Weekend Connector	Kirkhof Center	Campus West	see #37/48	25	25	Runs only when classes are in session
100	Ferris State Express	Central Station	Ferris State University	4 trips			Runs only when classes are in session

During the school year, additional routes are used to serve students in the Grand Rapids Public School (GRPS) district.

== Contracted services ==
=== DASH ===
Under contract with the City of Grand Rapids, The Rapid operates the Downtown Area Shuttle (DASH) circulator shuttle in downtown Grand Rapids. The routes are free to all passengers, operating every fifteen minutes, Monday through Saturday.

DASH routes were revamped in 2016 and again in 2018. From September 1 the North DASH straightened its route along Monroe, rather than along Ottawa Avenue. The South route was effectively merged into the West DASH, covering the west side DASH lots, Pearl Street, via Division and Fulton to Ionia covering the Arena South lots, and then south to the Downtown Market and Wealthy Street Silver Line station. Service to the Cook-DeVos Center previously provided by the Hill DASH has long since been replaced by the rerouting route 50 along the planned Laker Line route. Service frequency was also reduced from 8 minutes to 15 minutes, and service on Sunday was eliminated.

DASH was reconfigured again in May 2023. The two previous 'north' and 'west' routes were replaced with a single loop encircling downtown, routed to serve the previous routes' destinations, plus Central Station and the Grand Rapids Public Library. Service is now run in both directions, with route 51 following the loop clockwise, and 52 running counterclockwise. Monday and Tuesday service was eliminated, though Sunday service was brought back. A temporary route, DASH WORK, was introduced to service commuter lots, running during weekday peak hours only.

=== Grand Rapids Community College ===
Grand Rapids Community College provides route number 60, a shuttle bus connecting the school's main campus with the nearby DeVos campus. Stops are located in front of Sneden Hall at the DeVos campus, and at Fountain and Bostwick at the main campus. The bus is free for GRCC students and employees, and runs Monday through Thursday during the Fall and Winter semesters.

=== Ferris State University ===
Ferris State University contracts with The Rapid to provide shuttle bus service from Grand Rapids to the University's main campus in Big Rapids. Originating at Central Station, the route includes stops near Kendall College of Art and Design in Grand Rapids, and the Cedar Springs Meijer. Standard Rapid tickets are not valid on this route; special fares apply.

== Fares ==
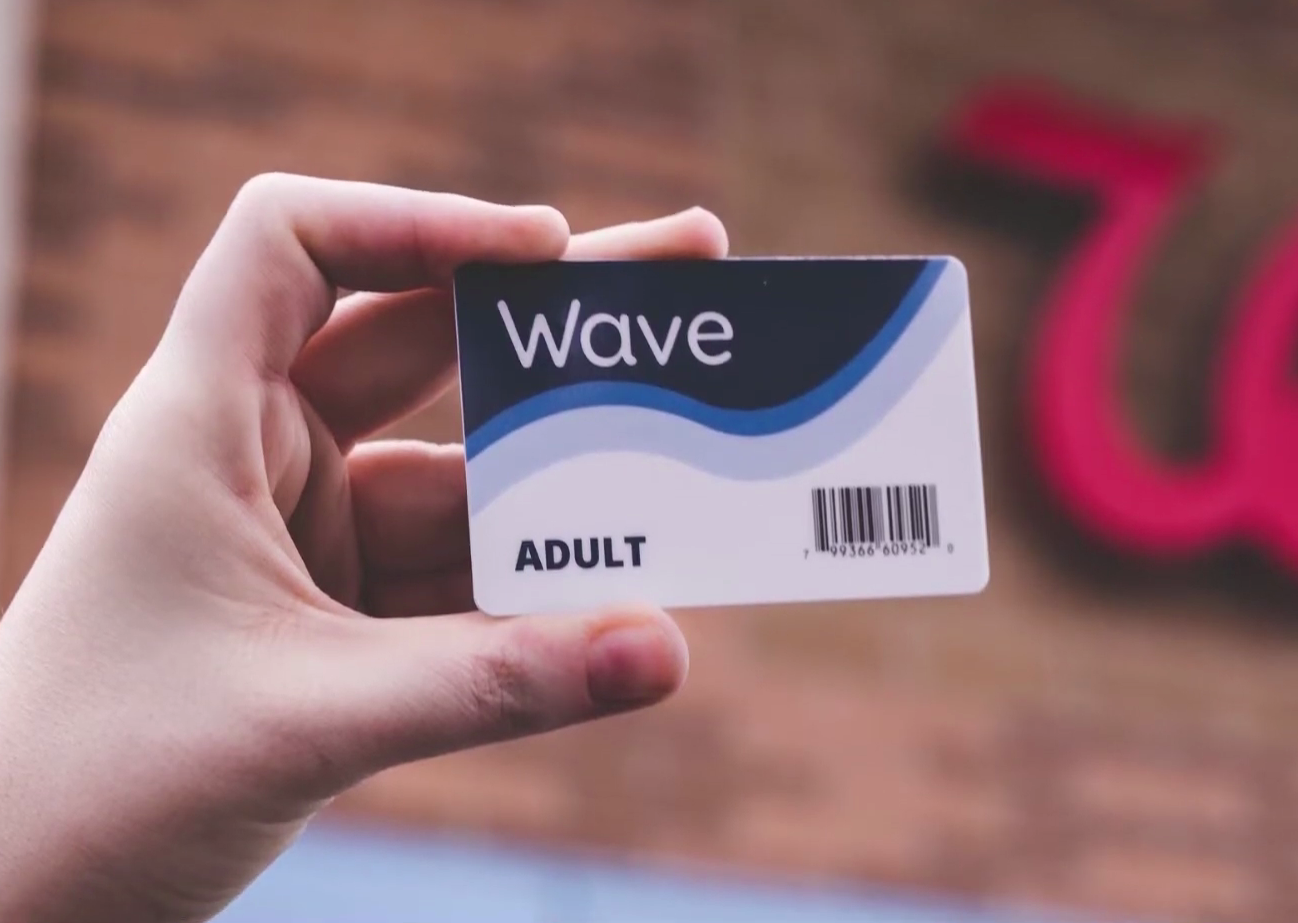
Promotional image of a Wave card, introduced in 2018

The Rapid's standard fare is $1.75. Passengers can pay their fare in cash or by using the system's reloadable Wave smart card. When paid with the Wave card, the fare includes unlimited rides for 105 minutes. The Wave card also includes a daily fare cap; a rider using the card will not be charged more than $3.50 in fares per day, regardless of how many rides are taken. As of April 1, 2025 fare capping will be $5.25 in fares per day, regardless of how many rides are taken.

Children under 42 inches (1,100 mm) in height do not pay a fare. A yellow stripe on the hand rail by the entrance denotes the height limit.

== Additional services ==
Other services provided by the ITP include:

- Car and Vanpooling Assistance: for carpools, the service matches people who make arrangements based on similar work schedules and travel patterns. For vanpools, employees can use The Rapid minivans to get to work.
- County Connection: provides transportation in all of Kent County, Michigan.
- GO!Bus: provides transportation for those with disabilities.
- PASS: curb-to-curb service. Provides transportation into specific neighborhoods where there is low concentration of bus routes.

== Future services ==
The Rapid has announced a new vision for new services to be in place by the year 2030. Proposed Services include a downtown streetcar system, expanded routes to Byron Center and eastern Ottawa County's Georgetown Township and the city of Hudsonville. A regional express bus service is also under consideration that would provide shuttle service from outlying areas into downtown Grand Rapids.
