= Jack Loeks =

American movie theatre pioneer

John "Jack" Loeks (family name formerly Loekis) (1918 – February 22, 2004) was an American movie theater pioneer, born in Grand Rapids, Michigan. He opened one of the first muliplex theaters, Studio 28.

== Career ==
Loeks opened his first theater, the single screen Foto News Theater, in downtown Grand Rapids, in 1944. In 1948, the theater was renamed to Midtown Theatre.

Loeks opened the theater Studio 28, which was one of the first multiplex theaters, in 1965. By 1988, Studio 28 was the largest multiplex in the world, with 20 screens and 6000 seats.

He also opened several drive-in movie theaters in West Michigan, and also opened a number of other cinemas across Michigan. Loeks also participated in a lawsuit against Hollywood which opened the way for privately owned theaters to show first-run Hollywood movies.

Loeks had two sons, Jim and John Jr. Jim broke off from the Jack Loeks theaters company and started his own movie theater, Star Theatres. John Loeks, Jr. has since become the owner and CEO of Loeks theaters, Inc., which is now known as Celebration! Cinema. Loeks also had 2 daughters, Lannie Loeks and Merie Loeks, who live in New Mexico.

== 1980s ==
During the mid and late 1980s, Loeks maintained a vacation home on Mackinac Island, Michigan. The island had no dedicated movie theater and traveling to the mainland for shows wasn't convenient for the island's residents, so Loeks partnered with a local hotel (named the Mackinac Hotel at the time) whose approximately 500 seat auditorium, complete with balcony, was used for weekly summer screenings.

Loeks would ship the movies from one of his Grand Rapids, Michigan area theaters to the island each week by small aircraft, and the weekly movies were a favorite event among the island's summer residents and visiting tourists. (Mostly the weekly shows operated at a loss, which Loeks himself personally absorbed.) Before each movie, Loeks would walk down the aisle to the front of the auditorium to introduce the week's picture and talk about the next week's show, always to thunderous applause and raucous cheers from appreciative island movie fans.
