= RiverTown Crossings =

Super Regional Mall in Western Michigan

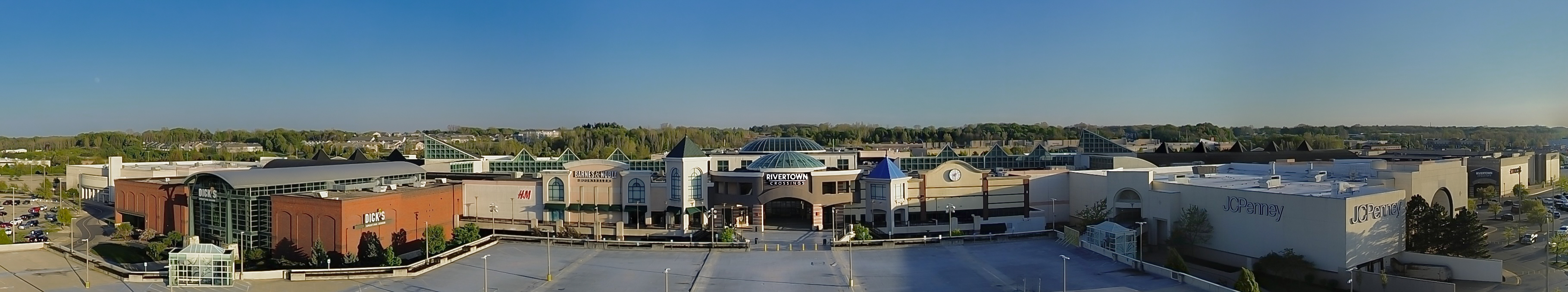
- RiverTown Crossings in 2025
- Location: Grandville, Michigan, United States
- Coordinates: 42.87945°N 85.75598°W
- Address: 3700 RiverTown Parkway
- Opened: November 3, 1999; 27 years ago
- Developer: General Growth Properties
- Manager: JLL Properties
- Owner: Poag Development Group
- Num. of stores: 100+
- Num. of anchor tenants: 8 (5 open, 2 part vacant, 1 vacant)
- Floor area: 1,267,272 sq ft (117,733.4 m^{2})
- Floors: 2 (3rd floor staff mezzanine in Dick's Sporting Goods and former Macy's, and public mezzanine in Celebration Cinema)
- Parking: Surrounding sectional; 7,033 free spaces
- Public transit: The Rapid
- Website: rivertowncrossings.com

RiverTown Crossings is a two-story enclosed super-regional shopping mall in Grandville, Michigan, the largest in West Michigan. It has five occupied anchors: Kohl's, JCPenney, Dick's Sporting Goods, Celebration Cinema, and Soar N Bounce. It has two partially vacant anchors last occupied by Macy's and Younkers, along with one fully vacant anchor formerly occupied by Sears. The mall has a capacity for 110 inline tenants and has 77% of its space occupied, higher than most average shopping malls.

== History ==
=== Planning ===
The area occupied by the mall was initially the site for Shoemaker Airfield, which was constructed in the 1960s. Plans for a commercial development in Grandville began in 1980 when citizens narrowly approved to rezone 100 acres of land near Rivertown Parkway and Wilson Avenue in an election following a petition initiative. A year later, General Growth Properties (GGP) purchased 99 acres of land on what is now Rivertown Parkway.

In 1990, Homart Development Company, a subsidiary of Sears, had begun eyeing a development of a new mall near the intersection of 44th Street and Ivanrest and met with the city for approval. In November 1990, Homart Development Co. originally proposed a 1 million square foot, 120-store indoor mall on 94 acres of land near the intersection, seeking for the land to be rezoned from high-tech industrial to commercial. GGP pushed against Homart's rezoning plan, saying that they sought to build their own mall, though city officials heard little from GGP regarding their plans. The City of Grandville turned down the plans in January 1991, stating that a 99-acre lot on Rivertown Parkway, which was adjacent to the property sought by Homart, was already zoned for commercial usage and was owned by GGP. Homart's plan for a mall was then put on hold after its director, Roy Vice, left the company and Homart Development Company was put up for sale in 1994, later being sold to GGP in 1995.

In October 1994 after waiting for the economy to strengthen, GGP vice president John Bergstrom proposed a 150-store mall with 4 anchor stores, stating that the project could be completed by Spring 1997. This plan was also declined on October 12, 1994, with Grandville Mayor James Buck stating that more commercial was not needed in the city.

In January 1996, GGP proposed the use of a 425 Agreement between Grandville and the neighboring city of Wyoming in order to obtain 80 acres of land in the latter city. The proposal suggested that Grandville provide permits, public services and utilities while Wyoming granted access to the land and received tax revenue. GGP then proposed to acquire more land adjacent to the site within Grandville in August 1996, with a new proposed mall site totaling 138 acres. GGP and the City of Grandville made a deal in October 1996 after GGP promised in August that the mall would only remain in Grandville and not span into Wyoming, with Grandville Mayor James Buck stating, "The construction of this mall has been anticipated for years. ... Our goal will be to provide the finest shopping mall in Michigan".

In 1997, a petition initiative began so that GGP could rezone 16 acres to improve drainage on their property. The project faced some opposition from local citizens and businesses. Taubman Company, then the owner Woodland Mall, pushed back on the plan. Some believed that constructing the mall would result in areas where street gangs could congregate. Others raised environmental concerns about the mall's construction in wetlands, though these arguments were turned down in court. With elections approaching and a proposal of rezoning land towards the mall on the ballot, GGP spent $41,534 ($81,165 in 2024) in support of the initiative while Taubman paid $13,378 ($26,143 in 2024) in advertisements opposing rezoning. Opponents of the mall said that city council member Ken Bouma was paid by GGP and questioned his objectivity. Bouma had previously pushed for Grandville to annex the land in Wyoming instead of using a 425 Agreement. Voters in Grandville ultimately voted in favor of the mall's construction, prompting Woodland Mall to spend millions of dollars to renovate its interior.

=== Construction and design ===
A revised plan for the mall was approved in May 1997 which reduced the size of the mall and provided the name for the center; RiverTown Crossings. Construction for the mall broke ground on December 6, 1997 with about 344 workers being present on site daily and a total number of 1,000 workers involved in building the shopping center. For construction materials, about 400 loads from concrete transport trucks, 5,000 different cans of paint, 200,000 floor tiles and 7,600,000 pounds (3,400,000 kg) of steel. On the interior, glass and brass fixtures were used as materials while images of the Great Lakes were displayed. Murals painted by Chicago-based artist Thomas Melvin in 1999 were featured in the mall's interior space. Outside, about 7,000 parking spaces were placed. At the main entrance, neon lighting was utilized to welcome visitors. For landscaping, nearly 10,000 plants were installed, including 3,000 shrubs and 1,600 trees.

Fearing the growth of online retailers and their convenience, GGP Properties designed RiverTown Crossings to have "clusters" of similar, competing retailers located in certain wings of the mall in order to lower shopping times for customers, with the shopping center serving as the first model for this concept.

The construction of RiverTown Crossings occurred over a period of 498 days, with the cost amounting to about $160 million, the equivalent to $301,302,437 in 2024. Overall, the mall, located on 116 acres of land, has the capacity for just over 130 stores and has about 1,249,697 square feet (116,100.7 m^{2}) of retail space available.

=== Grand opening ===
External videos
- Coverage of the mall's grand opening by WZZM on YouTube

RiverTown Crossings opened on November 3, 1999 just prior to the holiday season with five original anchors: Sears, Hudson's, Kohl's, Younkers and JCPenney with Barnes & Noble, Pottery Barn and Restoration Hardware featured as junior anchors. A 40-rider carousel was a central feature located at the center of the second floor, costing $1 for a two-minute ride. Surrounding the carousel was a food court with six restaurants operating during the opening and the seating capacity for 1,000 diners. South of the food court was a 20 screen Cinemark movie theater. Kahunaville, a tropical themed restaurant, was also located in the mall and one of the only restaurants being able to serve alcohol.

In the morning, shoppers waited in lines up to about two hours prior to entering the mall, queuing outdoors in temperatures hovering near 35 °F (2 °C) and a wind chill between 15 °F (−9 °C) and 25 °F (−4 °C) accompanied by some snow flurries. Local news station WZZM was present, interviewing visitors throughout the day. Tens of thousands of shoppers visited during the grand opening of RiverTown Crossings and in the subsequent week, over 200,000 shoppers were projected to visit RiverTown. Around 345,000 people visited the mall in its first five days, beating GGP's projections by large margins. At the time of RiverTown Crossings' opening in the holiday season of 1999, local malls were using promotions to attract shoppers in an effort to counteract growing competition from online retailers.

The mall was one of the first developments in the area and following its construction, many other restaurants and stores opened around it. Now the area is well developed and a major shopping district for the West Side of Grand Rapids including the Holland Area.

=== 2000s ===
By late 2000, the restaurant Tumbleweed, a Disney Store, the sporting goods store Galyan's and clothing retailer Old Navy opened, with Old Navy becoming another junior anchor and Galyan's becoming the mall's sixth anchor tenant. At its grand opening on October 6, 2000, Galyan's, with an area of 90,000 sq ft (8,400 m^{2}), hosted various sports celebrities and Olympians to sign autographs and featured a 45 ft (14 m) tall rock climbing wall. A NASCAR Silicon Motor Speedway racing center was present at the mall shortly after its opening. In June 2000, Rivertown Crossings became the first mall in Michigan to promote online shopping and coupons for shoppers, using the Mallibu.com website.

In 2001, Hudson's was renamed Marshall Field's. That year, NASCAR Silicon Motor Speedway Racing Center was closed after Silicon Entertainment, Inc., its creator, ceased operations.

On March 26, 2002, a Meijer store opened adjacent to the mall. In 2003, the former Tumbleweed was converted into Chili's. In 2004, Kahunaville closed and a replacement was being sought out. Also in 2004, Galyan's was renamed after being acquired by Dick's Sporting Goods.

In September 2005, UBU Home Furnishings replaced Kahunaville. Marshall Field's was renamed Macy's in 2006. The Cinemark theater was acquired by local movie theater company Celebration Cinema, and held its grand opening on June 27, 2007.

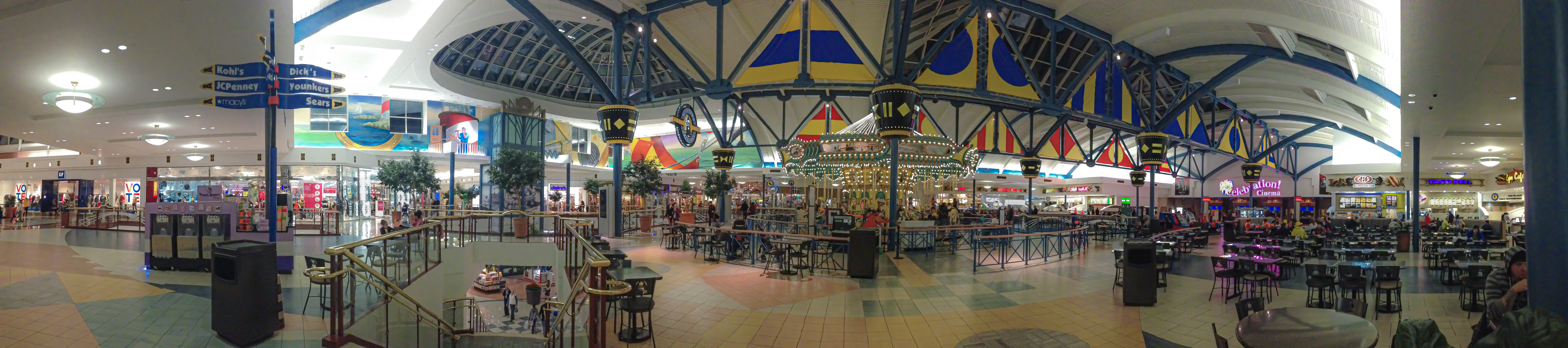
Panoramic photo of the RiverTown Crossings Mall food court and carousel, showing the mall's original decor

=== 2010s ===
Duluth Trading Company opened on the mall's property on November 16, 2017.

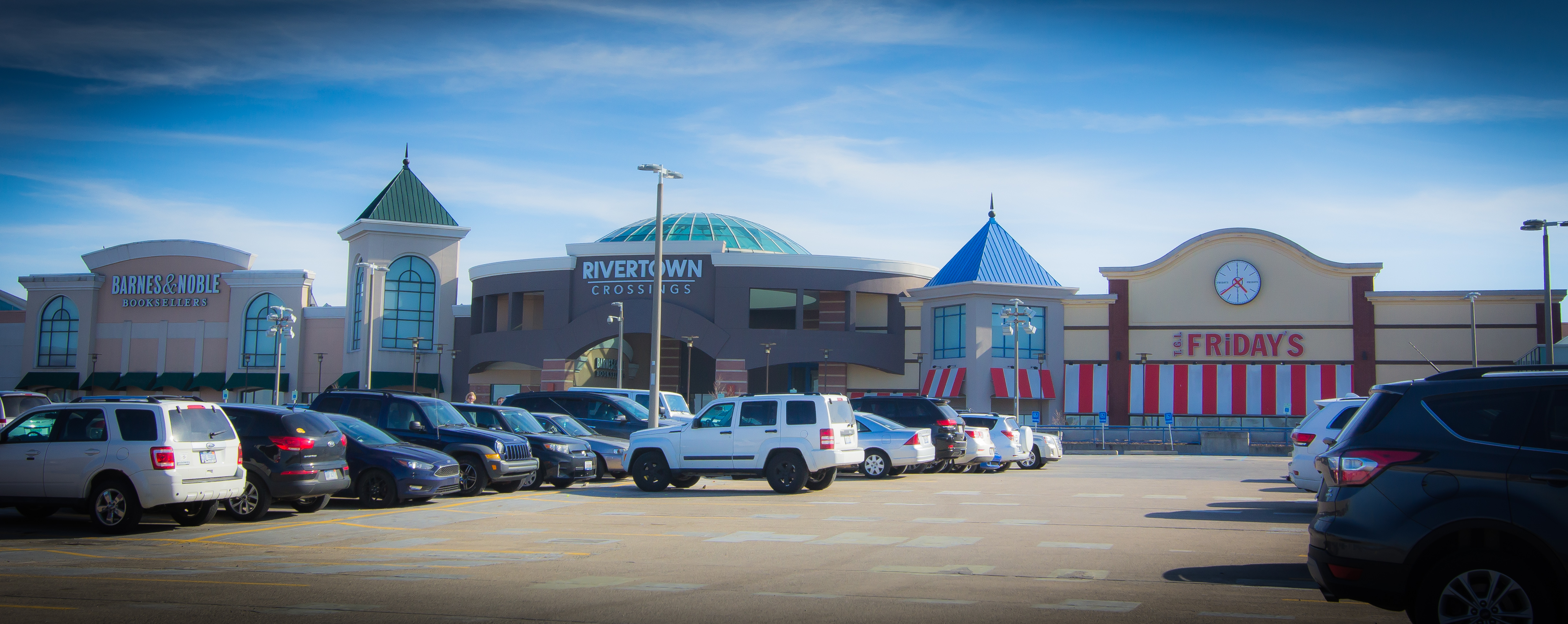
Exterior of RiverTown Crossings in 2019

In 2018, original developer General Growth Properties was acquired by the Brookfield Property Partners and ownership of RiverTown Crossings was transferred. During Brookfield's ownership, the mall experienced a lack of investment, with maintenance and structural quality deteriorating, affecting the satisfaction of visitors with the space.

On April 18, 2018, it was announced that Younkers would be closing its doors due to its parent company, The Bon-Ton Stores, being unable to find a buyer forcing the chain to go out of business. The store closed on August 29, 2018.

=== 2020s ===
Sears announced on November 9, 2020 that it would be closing as part of a plan to close 7 stores nationwide, with the store closing on January 24, 2021. In early 2021, H&M became a junior anchor when it opened in a large section of the mall on the second floor.

On August 30, 2024, Poag Development Group bought Rivertown Crossings from Brookfield Properties for an undisclosed price and shared a plan to work with Jones Lang LaSalle to revitalize and to keep the mall up to date. Poag shared visions of bringing a hotel, more adjacent retail space and even residential properties. Soar N Bounce, the largest trampoline park in West Michigan by square footage, opened on December 14, 2024, on the upper floor of the vacant Younkers space.

It was announced on January 13, 2025 that the parking deck, which was closed off for some time, would be demolished. Future plans are to replace it with surface parking and two new parcels for future tenants. Also in March 2025, Celebration Cinema announced that it would spend $5.8 million to renovate their RiverTown location, being the last remaining location in the Grand Rapids area to be renovated. Phase one of the renovation was completed in early July 2025, which included new 4K resolution laser projectors, Dolby Atmos speakers and heated recliner chairs in the auditorium, as well as updated decor in the hallways and bathrooms.

On October 1, 2025, it was announced that Inspire Marketplace would replace the old Harrison's West. Also in October 2025, the Grandville City Planning Commission approved plans to replace the Sears Auto Center with a Raising Cane's, what would be its second location in West Michigan. Construction of the restaurant was expected to begin in February 2026 starting with demolishing the building, and the store opened in October 2026.

Macy's announced on January 8, 2026, that it would be closing as part of a plan to close 14 stores by the end of Q1 2026. Jonathon Bryant, owner of the mall anchor location, said that he knew of the closing since purchasing the location in 2024, that exterior renovations were performed anticipating the closure, and that he was already in discussions about the entrance of new tenants when Macy's lease ended. Macy's closed in March 2026.

Days after the announcement of Macy's closure, Celebration Cinema announced the commencement of phase two of its renovations, which were completed in April 2026. Renovations completed included a redesigned lobby and a new restaurant, which is the only establishment in the mall with a liquor license.

== Features and attractions ==
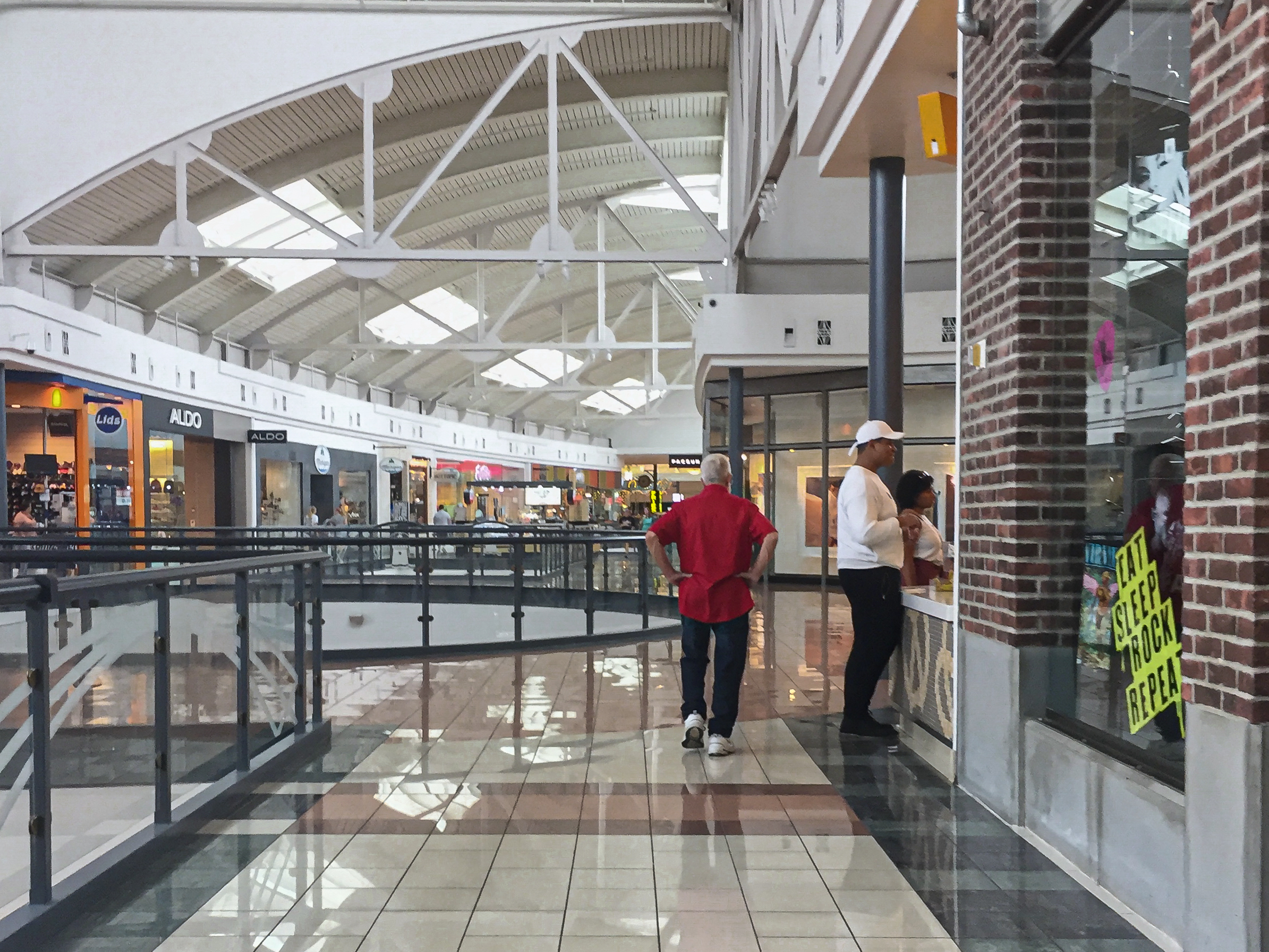
Interior of RiverTown Crossings in 2018

The mall has a capacity for 130 tenants with about 1,249,697 square feet (116,100.7 m^{2}) of retail space available. Food and beverage merchants are located throughout the mall. On the second floor, there is a food court with quick service restaurants and a carousel in the center.

South of the food court, there is a 20-screen Celebration Cinema movie theater, renovated in 2025, that serves as one of the mall's anchor tenants and one of the most popular cinema chains in Michigan, consecutively performing as one of the top 3 theaters in the state.

Across from Dick's Sporting Goods on the second floor, there is a Soar N Bounce Trampoline and Adventure Park, which was their first location and is currently the largest trampoline park in West Michigan.

The mall features murals painted by Chicago-based artist Thomas Melvin in 1999, when the mall first opened. As part of a minor renovation in 2017, the murals in the center court and the two wings were covered, with only those above the anchor stores remaining.

The mall's slogan was Mix it up when General Growth Properties owned the mall. This was one of few major slogans that General Growth Properties used with some of their malls.
