= DFCU Financial =

Credit union in Michigan, United States

- Type: Credit union
- Industry: Financial services
- Founded: 1950
- Headquarters: Dearborn, Michigan, United States
- Key people: Jim Cowper, Chairman of the Board; Ryan Goldberg, President and CEO
- Products: Savings; checking; consumer loans; mortgages; credit cards; online banking
- Total assets: $6.5 billion USD (2021)
- Website: dfcufinancial.com

DFCU Financial is a state-chartered credit union headquartered in Dearborn, Michigan, regulated by Michigan's Department of Licensing and Regulatory Affairs (LARA). DFCU Financial is one of Michigan's largest credit unions. As of October 2021, DFCU Financial had approximately $6 billion in assets, 232,000 members, and 27 branches in Metro Detroit, Ann Arbor, Grand Rapids and Lansing.

Eligibility for membership is extended to anyone who lives, works or worships in the 68 counties of the Lower Peninsula of Michigan. Member deposits up to $250,000 in DFCU Financial are insured through the National Credit Union Share Insurance Fund.

== History ==
Ford Engineering Employees Federal Credit Union was founded by employees of Ford Motor Company Engineering and Styling in February 1950. The Dearborn, Michigan, credit union changed its name to Ford Dearborn Federal Credit Union in 1954 and then to Dearborn Federal Credit Union in 1960. In 2003, the credit union renamed itself DFCU Financial.

== Bank conversion opposition ==
In December 2005, DFCU announced that it was seeking to convert to a mutual savings bank in order to expand geographically. NCUA initially rejected the member ballots that DFCU wanted to use for the conversion vote. In March 2006, the credit union mailed ballots to its members, enticing them to vote with cash prizes of up to $5000. DFCU encountered strong opposition to its conversion plans from its membership and the credit union community. Michigan Governor Jennifer Granholm, herself a member of DFCU, urged the membership to carefully review the credit union's disclosures. DFCU spent $1.2 million in its efforts to convince its membership to vote for the conversion and refused to release minutes from meetings of the Board of Directors to the membership. Members of the credit union formed a group called DFCU Owners United to oppose the conversion. The member group gathered 1762 signatures on a petition to recall the Board of Directors. After receiving the petition, DFCU withdrew its application to convert to a bank. Despite being required by its bylaws to hold a special membership meeting within 30 days of receiving the petition, DFCU refused to do so based on federal law. Members filed a lawsuit against the credit union and a Michigan court ruled in favor of the members in March 2008.

== Recent mergers ==
In 2009, DFCU Financial merged with CapCom Credit Union. CapCom was founded in the 1930s as the Municipal Employees Credit Union by firemen in Lansing to serve municipal employees. The Municipal Employees Credit Union grew through mergers over the years, most recently merging with Citizens Choice, Spartan Stores, Allied Builders & Contractors and Capital Community Credit Union/LSI Financial. The merger was approved by NCUA in November 2008. The merger required approval from DFCU Financial members, since the CapCom state charter was going to be the surviving charter. The vote was approved by the DFCU Financial membership, and on March 1, 2009, the merger was finalized.

An official letter announcing a merger with MidWest Financial Credit Union of Ann Arbor was mailed to members on June 15, 2010. MidWest Financial had been formed to serve employees of the University of Michigan Health System. Members of MidWest Financial approved this merger effective October 1, 2010. The computer system integration was completed on March 28, 2011. With this merger, DFCU Financial gained a presence in Washtenaw County with five branch locations.

In 2023, DFCU Financial expanded to Florida with the acquisition of First Citrus Bank and its six branches in the Tampa and St. Petersburg areas. DFCU continued its Florida expansion in 2024 with the acquisition of branches from MidWestOne in Naples and Fort Myers.

== Operations ==
DFCU Financial operates neighborhood branches and ATMs in several Michigan communities. Southeast Michigan neighborhood locations include: Canton, Commerce Township, Dearborn, Garden City, Livonia, Madison Heights, Novi, Plymouth, Riverview and Ypsilanti. Outside of Southeast Michigan, DFCU Financial has three neighborhood branches in Lansing and four in Grand Rapids that were acquired with the merger of the former CapCom Credit Union. It also operates eight branches in Florida covering the Tampa Bay area as well as St. Petersburg, Naples and Fort Myers.

In addition to neighborhood branch locations, DFCU Financial also operates ATMs in some local workplaces, including hospitals and Ford Motor Company sites in Dearborn.
