= Woodland Mall =

Shopping mall in Kentwood, Michigan, U.S.

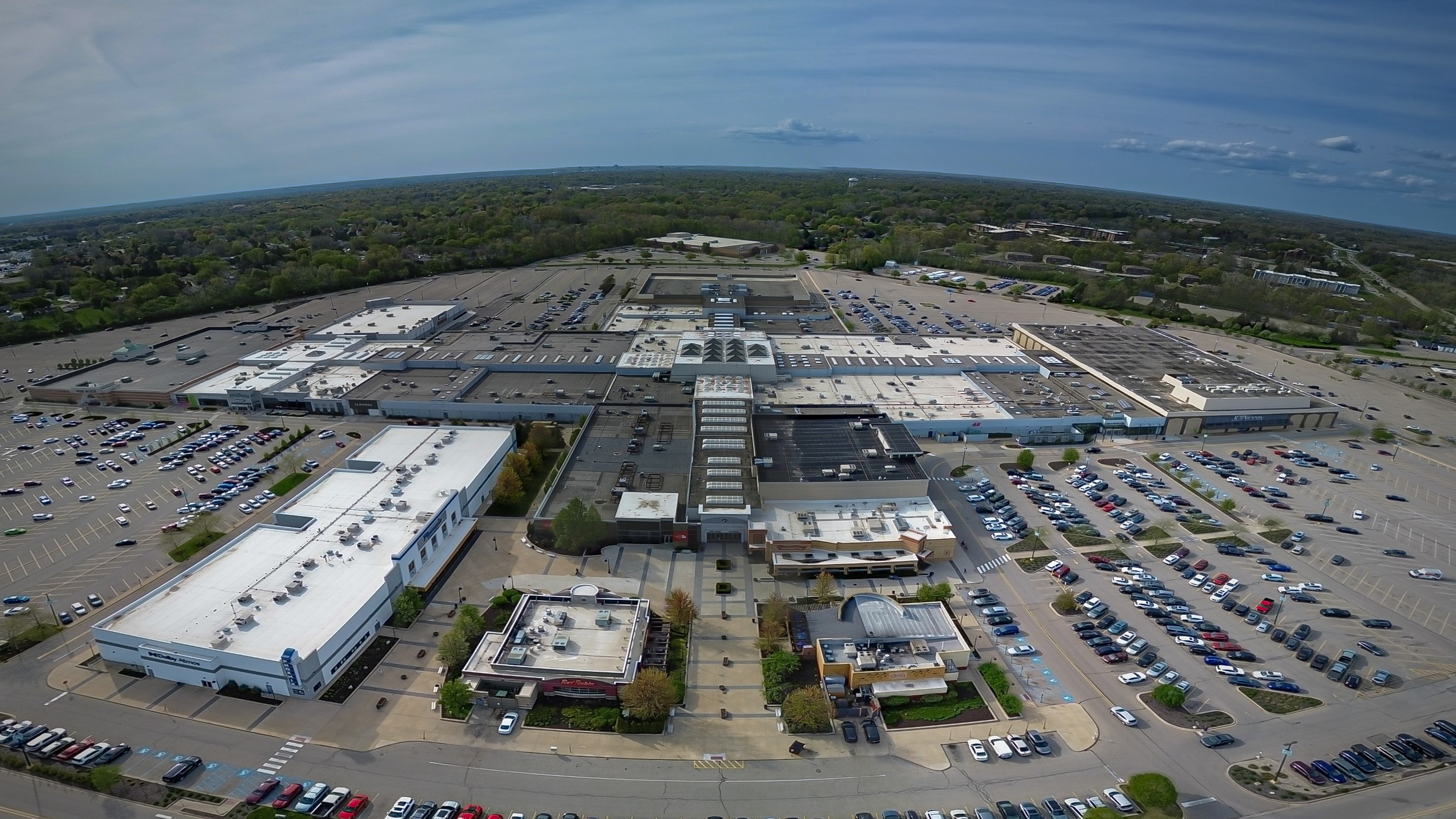
- Aerial image of Woodland Mall in 2025
- Location: Kentwood, Michigan, United States
- Coordinates: 42.91629°N 85.5879°W
- Opened: March 13, 1968; 58 years ago
- Developer: Taubman Centers
- Manager: PREIT
- Owner: PREIT
- Num. of stores: 175+
- Num. of anchor tenants: 3
- Floor area: 1,158,942 sq ft (107,700 m^{2})
- Floors: 1 (2 in Barnes & Noble, JCPenney, and Macy's)
- Public transit: The Rapid
- Website: shopwoodlandmall.com

Woodland Mall is an enclosed super-regional shopping mall located in Kentwood, Michigan, a suburb of Grand Rapids. Woodland Mall averages 12 million yearly visitors according to PREIT. The mall has over 170 stores and features selected stores such as JCPenney, Macy's, and Von Maur, Main Event Entertainment, Apple, LEGO, Toys "R" Us and JD Sports in addition to Phoenix Theatres and Texas de Brazil, Red Robin, Pop Mart, the world's largest Squishable store, and a future Shake Shack, Portillo's Restaurants & Rowan coming soon to the Mall. The mall also has Michigan's largest Barnes & Noble Booksellers. and the only Lego store in West Michigan

The mall is owned and managed by PREIT, which acquired it from its developer, Taubman Centers, in 2006. The mall is also the most popular mall in Western Michigan. The mall has 150 spaces for inside the mall and 30 outparcel locations.

== History ==
Woodland Mall opened on March 13, 1968, at the northwestern corner of 28th Street (M-11) and East Beltline Avenue (M-37). The mall was built at a southwest-to-northeast orientation, with Sears at the southwestern end, and JCPenney at the northeastern end. A Kresge dime store was also located in the Sears wing. Another mall, Eastbrook Mall (now Centerpointe Mall), was located on the northeastern corner of the same intersection. A 1975 expansion to Woodland Mall brought a northwesterly-oriented central wing which ended in a third anchor store, Hudson's. After the closure of Kresge in 1987, the store's former space was divided among smaller retailers.

Taubman attempted to block the construction of RiverTown Crossings in the neighboring suburb of Grandville, though citizens of the city voted in support of the future competitor. Anticipating RiverTown Crossings' opening, Taubman planned to renovate the entire interior of Woodland at a cost of $45 million, the equivalent to $86,609,841 in 2024, and Lord & Taylor was proposed in 1997 as a fourth anchor store at the southeastern end of the mall. However, Hudson's attempted to sue the mall, claiming veto power over the addition of new anchor stores, and the Lord & Taylor was never built.

A food court (Cafes in the woods) was built next to JCPenney in 1999 as well as a play area in the Sears wing. Also in 1999, RiverTown Crossings opened. This was the first serious form of retail competition for Woodland Mall, as prior to the opening of RiverTown Crossings, Woodland was the only super-regional mall in Metro Grand Rapids. In the late 1990s Woodland Mall experienced many other renovations including new flooring and curves to the ceiling throughout the mall, new lighting and décor as well as updated entrances to look more modern.

Hudson's was converted to Marshall Field's in 2001 in a nameplate consolidation by parent Target Corporation (formerly known as Dayton-Hudson), and then to Macy's in 2006 as the result of an acquisition. A 14-screen movie theater (then owned by Cinemark) was added to the southeastern portion of the mall in 2006, the same year in which PREIT acquired the mall from Taubman. Celebration Cinema purchased the movie theater complex (as well as a former Cinemark at RiverTown Crossings) a year later.

Barnes & Noble, in October 2008, announced that it would be relocating from a nearby store to a new location at the mall. On Wednesday, October 21, 2009, the two-story bookstore opened to the public.

In 2013, H&M announced that it would be opening its first location in Michigan outside of Metro Detroit which opened in October 2013.

On January 4, 2017, it was announced that the Sears anchor store would close. It was demolished for a major expansion featuring 10-15 new retailers, with a Von Maur anchor store at the end of the wing. Von Maur opened on October 12, 2019.

The first Lego store in West Michigan opened in September 2024.

On August 16, 2024, Michigan's first Main Event Entertainment center, located in a new building just outside the southeast entrance near Von Maur.
