= Fife (disambiguation) =

Fife is a council area and historic county in Scotland.

Fife may also refer to:

- Fife (instrument), a musical instrument similar to the piccolo

== Places ==
- Fife, Texas, U.S.
- Fife, Virginia, U.S.
- Fife, Washington, U.S.
- Fife Lake, Saskatchewan, Canada
- Fife Lake, Michigan, U.S.
- Fife Street, A street in Kowloon, Hong Kong

== Other uses ==
- Fédération Internationale Féline (FIFe), a federation of cat registries
- Festival International du Film Espoir (FIFE), an annual film festival held in Ivory Coast
- USS Fife, a 1979 U.S. Navy ship
- Fife, the number 5 in the NATO phonetic alphabet
- Fife (cutlery), a combination utensil

== People with the surname ==
- Allan Fife (born 1954), Australian businessman
- Austin E. and Alta S. Fife, pioneering Utah folklorists
- Catherine Fife (born 1968/1969), Canadian politician
- Connie Fife (born 1961), Cree Canadian poet and editor
- Dane Fife (born 1979), American basketball player
- Danny Fife (born 1949), American baseball player
- David Fife (1805–1877), Canadian farmer
- Dougie Fife (born 1990), Scottish rugby union player
- Fred J. Fife (born 1937), American politician and engineer
- Graeme Fife, English writer, playwright and broadcaster
- Irwin Fife (1894–1971), American inventor
- Ivy Fife (1905–1976), New Zealand painter
- James Fife, pirate active in the Caribbean
- Jason Fife (born 1981), American football player
- Jenna Fife (born 1995), Scottish footballer
- John Fife, human rights activist
- Josh Fife (born 2000), Australian racing driver
- Macduff of Fife (died 1298), played a small but significant role in the Wars of Scottish Independence
- Phyllis Fife (born 1948), American painter
- Ralph Fife (1920–2000), American football player
- Raymond Fife (1973-1985), American murder victim
- Robert Fife (born 1954), Canadian journalist
- Rolf Einar Fife (born 1961), Norwegian diplomat
- Sam Fife (1926–1979), Christian leader
- Stephen Fife (born 1986), American baseball player
- Wal Fife (1929–2017), Australian politician
- William Fife (disambiguation), several

=== Characters ===
- Barney Fife, a fictional character in The Andy Griffith Show portrayed by Don Knotts

== People with the given name ==
- Fife Symington (born 1945), American businessman and politician

== See also ==
- Fief, a central element of feudalism
- Fife Lake Township, Michigan, U.S.
- Fifeshire (disambiguation)
- Fifer (disambiguation)
- Fyfe, a name
- Fyffe (disambiguation)
- Phife Dawg, a musician
- Phyfe
