= Fifer (disambiguation) =

A fifer is a non-combatant military occupation of a foot soldier who originally played the fife during combat.

Fifer may also refer to:

- Fifer (Scotland), a native of Fife

== People ==
- James Fifer (1930–1986), American rower
- Joseph W. Fifer (1840–1938), Republican governor of Illinois
- Richard Fifer Carles (born 1957), Panamanian businessman and politician
- Robert Fifer (born 1956), American business consultant, author and speaker
- Scott Fifer, founder of GO Campaign

=== Characters ===
- Nicki Fifer, on The Drew Carey Show portrayed by Kate Walsh

== Other uses ==
- The Fifer (or Young Flautist), an 1866 painting by French painter Édouard Manet
- Fifer, a Five-wicket haul in cricket

== See also ==
- Fife (disambiguation)
- Fyffe (disambiguation)
- Fyfe, a name
- Fief, a central element of feudalism
