= 28th Street Metro Cruise =

Annual auto show and car cruise

- Status: Active
- Genre: Auto show, cruise
- Frequency: Annual
- Venue: 28th Street, Rogers Plaza, Woodland Mall
- Locations: Wyoming, Grand Rapids and Kentwood, Michigan
- Inaugurated: August 27, 2005
- Previous event: August 23, 2025; 14 months ago
- Next event: August 21, 2026; 2 months ago
- Website: 28thstreetmetrocruise.org

The 28th Street Metro Cruise, commonly known as the Metro Cruise, is an annual auto show and car cruise event held on 28th Street in Wyoming, Grand Rapids and Kentwood, Michigan, typically occurring on the fourth Friday and Saturday of August, one week after the Woodward Dream Cruise. Participants often cruise in their vehicles down 28th Street, driving 15 miles (24 km) between Grandville and Cascade Township and participating in events occurring in the corridor.

== Background ==
External videos
- Muscle cars cruising 28th Street and gathering at Rogers Plaza in 1992

Cruising down 28th Street near Rogers Plaza in Wyoming was a common pastime for car enthusiasts in the late 20th century when the street was the main retail corridor from the 1960s until the 1990s. In 1999 when Rivertown Crossings Mall opened in Grandville near the southwest border of Wyoming, many commercial tenants left the 28th Street corridor. Following the opening of the M-6 highway in late-2004, the Wyoming-Kentwood Area Chamber of Commerce planned the first Metro Cruise to be held in August 2005 in an initiative to bring business to 28th Street.

== History ==
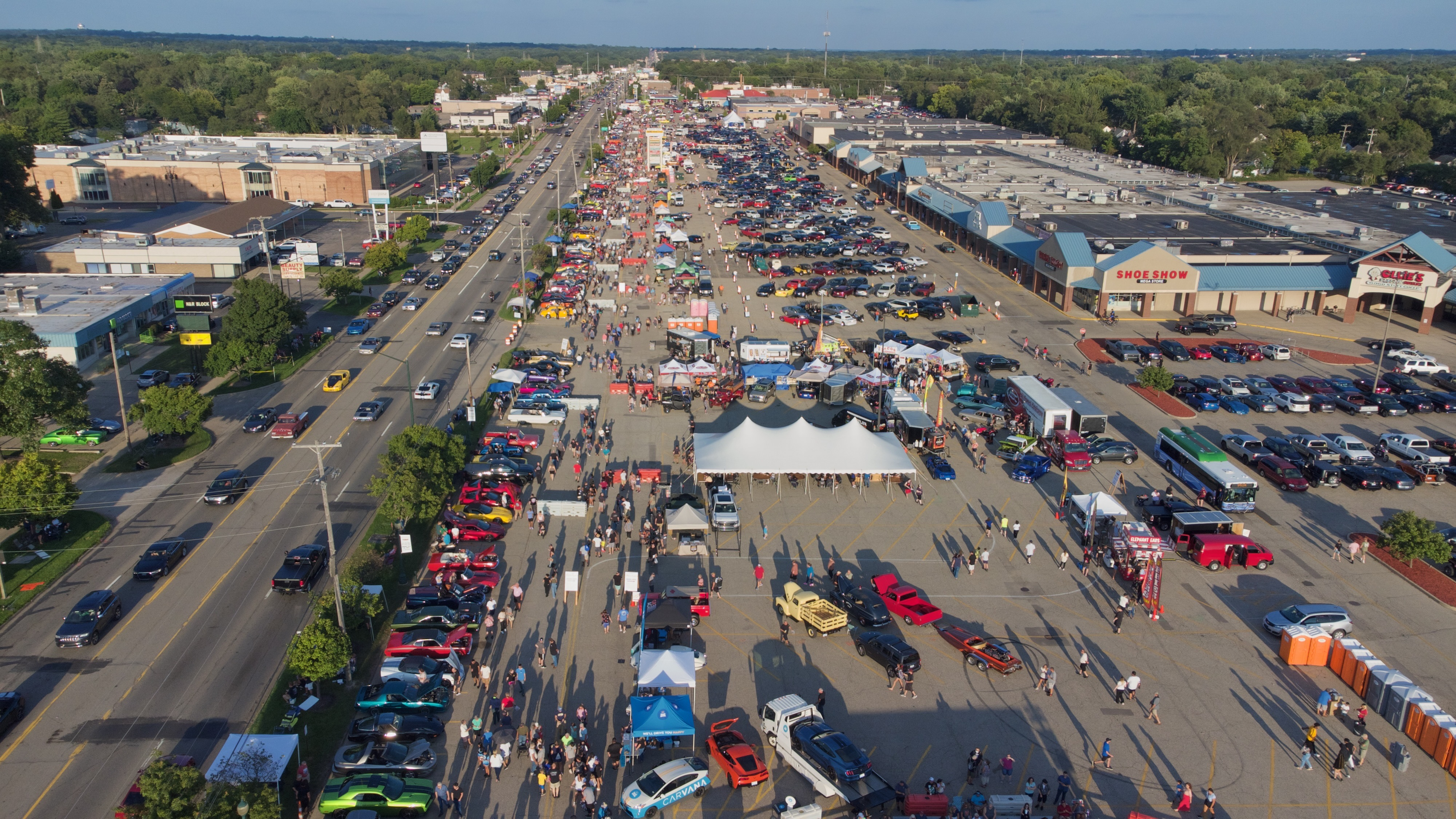
A view of vehicles on 28th Street and parked at Rogers Plaza during the Metro Cruise

The first Metro Cruise in 2005 experienced 85,000 visitors and 15,000 vehicles participating in one day. In 2007, the cruise was expanded to two days of events and the prohibition of burnouts was strictly enforced following the Selmer, Tennessee burnout tragedy, when 6 were killed and 20 injured after a funny car crashed into a crowd during a burnout. In 2015, a locally restored GM Futurliner participated in the cruise and was added to the National Historic Vehicle Register. By 2019, between 250,000 and 275,000 people visited the Metro Cruise. In 2020, the Metro Cruise was cancelled due to the COVID-19 pandemic in the United States. The cruise would return the following year in 2021, producing an estimated $7 million for the local economy that week.

== Events ==
A Pontiac G8 performing a dynamometer test at Rogers Plaza

The main event sites for the Metro Cruise are two shopping malls; Rogers Plaza and Woodland Mall. The majority of events are free and include classic automobile shows, concerts, dynamometer testing, food concessions and the Miss Metro Cruise pin-up girl contest.

=== Soul Cruise ===
In 2022, a separately-organized Soul Cruise event began to be held annually on the Sunday following the Metro Cruise, with the cruise being located primarily within the southeast side of Grand Rapids.

== See also ==
- Back to the Bricks
- Cruisin' Downriver
