= List of people from Wagga Wagga =

This article is a list of notable people from the Australian regional city of Wagga Wagga, New South Wales.

== Arts, literature ==
- Patricia Carlon (crime writer, born in Wagga Wagga)
- Flora Eldershaw (novelist and critic, educated and died in Wagga Wagga)
- Dame Edna Everage (fictional character)
- Billy Field (singer and songwriter)
- Dame Mary Gilmore (socialist, poet and journalist)
- Nina Las Vegas (Nina Agzarian) (DJ and radio presenter)
- George Moore (radio presenter)
- Andrew Mueller (journalist, author)

== Business ==
- Raelene Castle (Rugby Australia CEO 2017–2020)
- Geoff Dixon (Qantas CEO)
- Allan Fife (founder of Fife Capital)
- Don Kendell (founder of Kendell Airlines)

== Crime ==
- Janine Balding (born and raised in Wagga Wagga, raped and murdered in Sydney in 1988)
- Andrew John Harper (the "Heartbreak Bandit"; defrauded and deceived women and business people)
- Arthur Orton (famous imposter claiming to be the Tichborne heir in late 19th century)

== Film, television, and theatre ==
- Louise Alston (film director and producer)
- Michelle Brasier (musician, comedian and actor)
- Sharna Burgess (professional ballroom dancer on Dancing with the Stars)
- Kerry Casey (actor)
- Bill Kerr (actor)
- Lex Marinos (actor)
- Wayne Pygram (actor)
- Geraldine Quinn (performer)

== Military and policing ==
- Henry Baylis (first police magistrate of the area)
- Sir Thomas Blamey (World War II general and Australia's first and only field-marshal)
- John Hurst Edmondson (Australia's first World War II Victoria Cross recipient)

== Music ==
- Carmel Kaine (classical violinist)
- Sam Moran (former member of the children's musical group The Wiggles)
- Allan Prior (tenor)
- Emma Swift (singer-songwriter)

== Politics and government ==
- Helen Coonan (former Liberal party senator for New South Wales 1996–2011)
- Charles Hardy (politician)
- Michael McCormack (member for the Riverina and former deputy prime minister)
- Charles Abbott (Australian politician) (South Australia Attorney General)

== Sport ==
- George P. Anderson (Australian rules footballer)
- David Barnhill (rugby league footballer)
- Alex Blackwell (cricketer)
- Kate Blackwell (cricketer)
- Scobie Breasley (jockey)
- Greg Brentnall (rugby league footballer)
- Wayne Carey (Australian rules footballer)
- Wayne Carroll (Australian rules footballer)
- Ben Cross (rugby league footballer; played for Canberra, Melbourne and Newcastle)
- Neale Daniher (Australian rules footballer)
- Terry Daniher (Australian rules footballer)
- Patrick Dwyer (Olympic athlete)
- Steve Elkington (golfer)
- Marc Glanville (rugby league footballer)
- Paul Hawke (Australian rules footballer)
- Elliott Himmelberg (Australian rules footballer)
- Harrison Himmelberg (Australian rules footballer)
- Nathan Hines (rugby union footballer)
- Brad Kahlefeldt (2006 Commonwealth Games triathlon gold medallist)
- Paul Kelly (Australian rules footballer)
- Geoff Lawson (cricketer)
- Jim Lenehan (rugby union footballer)
- Jack Littlejohn (rugby league footballer)
- Steve Martin (Australian rugby league team)
- Bill Mohr (Australian rules footballer)
- Cameron Mooney (Australian rules footballer)
- Chris Mortimer (rugby league footballer)
- Peter Mortimer (rugby league footballer)
- Steve Mortimer (rugby league footballer)
- Nigel Plum (rugby league footballer)
- Alicia Quirk (Australian Women's rugby sevens player and 2016 Summer Olympics gold medal winner)
- Tony Roche (tennis player)
- Adam Schneider (Australian rules footballer)
- Nathan Sharpe (rugby union footballer)
- Nick Skinner (rugby league footballer)
- Michael Slater (cricketer)
- Jamie Soward (rugby league footballer and coach)
- Peter Sterling (rugby league footballer and TV presenter/sports commentator)
- Mark Taylor (cricketer)

== Other ==
- Thomas Smith Bellair (actor and Wagga Wagga publican)
- Leonie Byrnes (school teacher)
- William Monks (architect)
- Isabel Reid (born 1932; Wiradjuri elder and Stolen Generations advocate)
