= Berkley Theater =

Former historic movie theater in Berkley, Michigan, USA

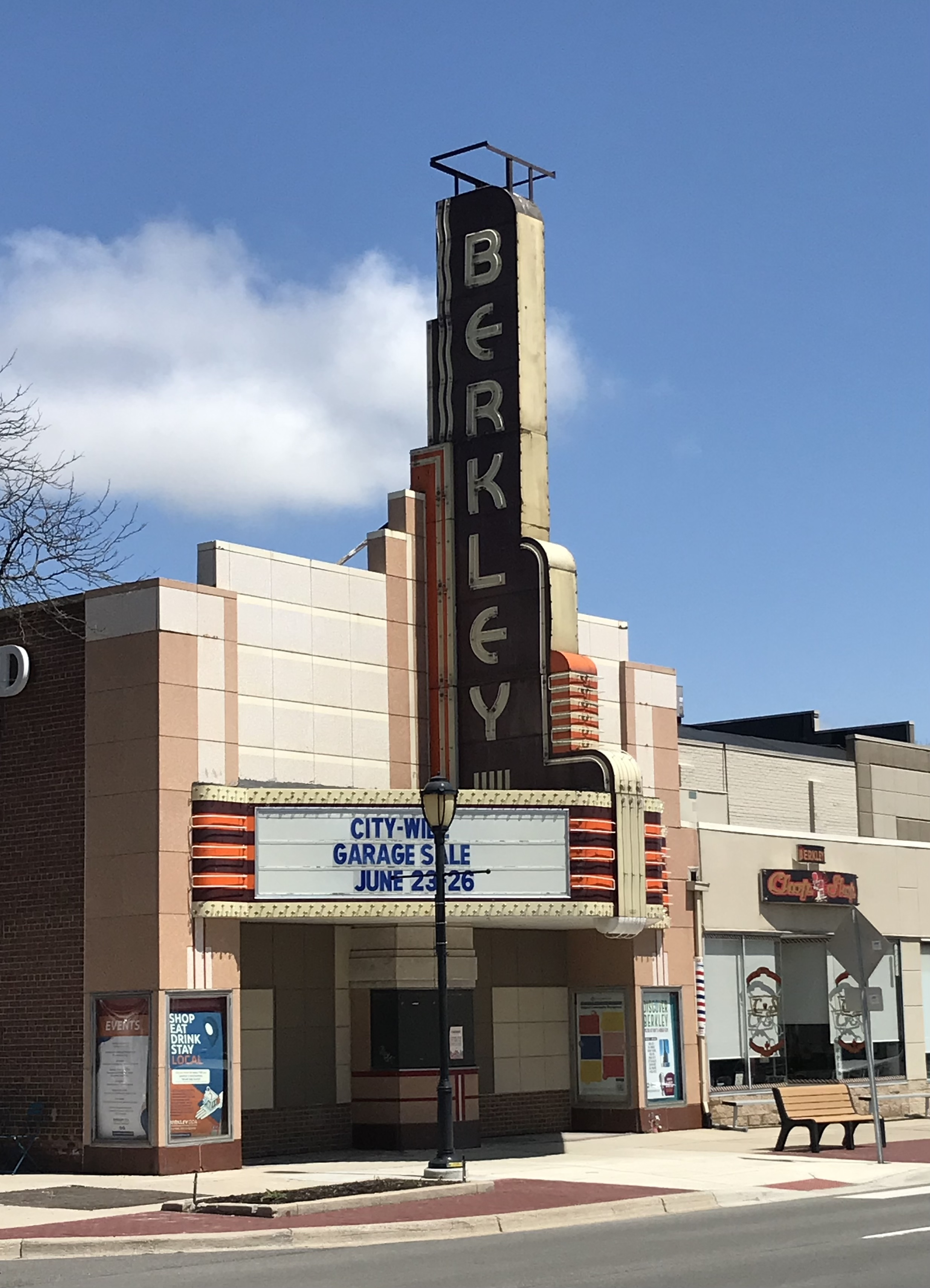
- The Berkley Theater Facade in 2022
- Interactive map of Berkley Theater
- Address: 2990 W. 12 Mile Road; Berkley, Michigan; 48072
- Coordinates: 42°30′12″N 83°11′21.3″W
- Owner: John Igna and Vincent Laika (former); Komer Family (former); Glenn Wilhelm (current)
- Capacity: 978 (1941-1963); 851 (1963-1993)
- Type: Movie theater

Construction
- Opened: November 20, 1941
- Renovated: 1958, 1963, 1981
- Closed: September 26, 1993
- Architects: Johnson Construction; Birmingham, Michigan

The Berkley Theater is a small-town movie palace located on the north side of West 12 Mile Road at the corner of Robina Road in downtown Berkley, Michigan. The theater specialized in mainstream movies and was in operation for 52 continuous years until its closure in 1993, when it was converted into a Rite Aid drug store. The building is a historical landmark and the city has retained the theater's marquee to post community events. It serves as a backdrop for events such as the Berkley CruiseFest, a classic car parade and the Friday night precursor to Metro Detroit's annual Woodward Dream Cruise.

The single screen auditorium originally had 978 seats and featured first-run double-bill movies. Starting in the 1970s, it became a discount theater showing second-run movies at low prices with the moniker "A Dollar At All Times". In its final years of operation, it showed a mixture of first-run and recently released films.

The Berkley Theater is slated to reopen in 2026 primarily as a live entertainment venue.

== History ==
=== First theater ===
Before the construction of the current Berkley Theater, there previously existed another one which was also located on 12 Mile Road in Downtown Berkley, which opened in January 1921. The original Berkley Theater was built by local contractor John Folwell for $25,000 (equivalent to $347,000 in 2024), and it was a 500-seat auditorium. It was owned by Leonard Leone Sr. (An Italian immigrant) who also operated a small market on the adjacent property. Originally called the Leone Motion Picture Theater, the name was changed to The Berkley Theater in September 1921. This is significant as it predates the official naming of the city by two years. A confectionery kiosk was located in the lobby which was operated by George R. Hughson and was affectionately dubbed "Dad's place". Live music by Lorenzen's Orchestra of Detroit accompanied the silent films. There was also a 20-by-50-foot (6 m × 15 m) dance floor positioned between the seats and the stage, which was used by patrons that stayed after the Friday night movie for dancing.

On the night of May 13, 1931, the old Berkley Theater was destroyed in a fire. It was determined the fire was caused by arson. Leone collected $15,000 in insurance money (equivalent to $248,000 in 2024), but he never rebuilt the theater.

=== Second theater ===
The new Berkley Theater was designed by Johnson Construction Company of Birmingham, Michigan. Its art deco exterior had porcelain like tiles with a red and cream color scheme. There were also four pairs of doors with geometric glass panes. The theater had not seen many updates since it was finished in 1941. One of its interesting features was a sound proof compartment known as "the cry room" where mothers with small children could view the movie through a plate glass window with a loud speaker so as not to disturb the patrons in the auditorium. The projector had two reels that had to be changed halfway through the film. The original projector was used for its 52 years of operation. The auditorium was one of the few theaters that had a center aisle, there was a blue neon clock to the left of the screen, and faintly yellow tube lights on the side walls. There was a stage with a red velvet curtain that was often used for live performances. The lobby contained an octagon-shaped mirror that was so large that it reflected the movie in it.

The new Berkley Theater opened on Thanksgiving Day in 1941, three months after neighboring Royal Oak opened its own Main Art Theater. The first two films shown at the theater that day were Here Comes Mr. Jordan and Harmon of Michigan. The latter film starred Michigan Wolverines halfback and Heisman Trophy winner Tom Harmon. It was originally owned by John Igna and Vincent Laika of Detroit.

The Berkley Theater in 1976

The theater was leased by James M. Nederlander of the Nederlander Group from 1958 to 1961. During that time, Nederlander added air conditioning, new plush seats, lighted parking, plus other innovations to enhance the movie going experience. The owners leased out the storefronts to different vendors. Over the years, there was a resale shop, baseball card shop and jewelry store. Harry A. Komer took over the lease in 1961 and bought the theater outright a year later. From that point on it was a family business, independently owned and operated by the Komer Family until its closure. After purchasing the building, Komer took out some seats to provide more leg room for patrons, reducing its capacity to 851. He also replaced the coal furnace with a gas one. Komer took tickets and greeted the customers at the door, while his wife Lillian kept the books. During his tenure, there were many popular film holdouts, but the longest one was Butch Cassidy and the Sundance Kid, which ran for 135 days until it was replaced in April 1970 with True Grit.

In the mid-1970s, the Berkley Theatre transitioned to second-run movie showings for the price of $1.00 per ticket. In 1981, Komer retired at the age of 80, and his son and daughter-in-law, Richard and Judy Komer took over. They refurbished the chairs and equipped the theater with surround sound. The theater continued to thrive in the eighties and their freshly popped popcorn with real butter won several local awards. But by the early 1990s, the advent of cable television and VHS had taken its toll on the discount movie business. The theater switched to first-run movies at slightly lower prices but ultimately could not compete with the multiplexes with several screens that had the ability to move an unprofitable movie to a smaller screen after its initial opening.

The last regular movie to be shown at the Berkley Theater was Jurassic Park. On September 26, 1993, the day of the theater's closure, the Komer Family hosted a private gala for friends, employees and city officials which showcased the 1942 musical Yankee Doodle Dandy. After its closure, the Komer Family sold the building to Perry Drugs under the condition that they keep the marquee and the exterior facade of the building. The city of Berkley leased the marquee for $1.00 per year, symbolic of the price of a movie ticket for the theater's many years in operation.

The theater's classic red cherry doors, chairs and other paraphernalia, are currently displayed at the Berkley Historical Museum near downtown Berkley. The museum sells books, postcards, magnets and other gift items with a picture of the theater's marquee as it is now considered a symbol of the city.

== Future ==
The Perry Drugs (now Rite Aid) store closed in September 2024 as part of the chain’s bankruptcy. The building was then sold to Glenn Wilhelm, who also owns the restored Roxy Theater in Rochester. Wilhelm then announced plans to renovate the building into a live entertainment venue, complete with bars and a restaurant. The renovated Berkley Theatre is slated to open in 2026.

== See also ==
- Main Art Theater
