= Ian Fyfe =

Ian Fyfe may refer to:

- Ian Fyfe (British journalist) (born 1918 or 1919; died 6 June 1944), journalist for the Daily Mirror who died at D-Day
- Ian Fyfe (Pakistani journalist) (born 1946 or 1947; died 5 August 2005), Pakistani cricketer, coach and sports journalist

== See also ==
- Iain Fyfe (born 1982), Australian footballer
