= Rogers Plaza =

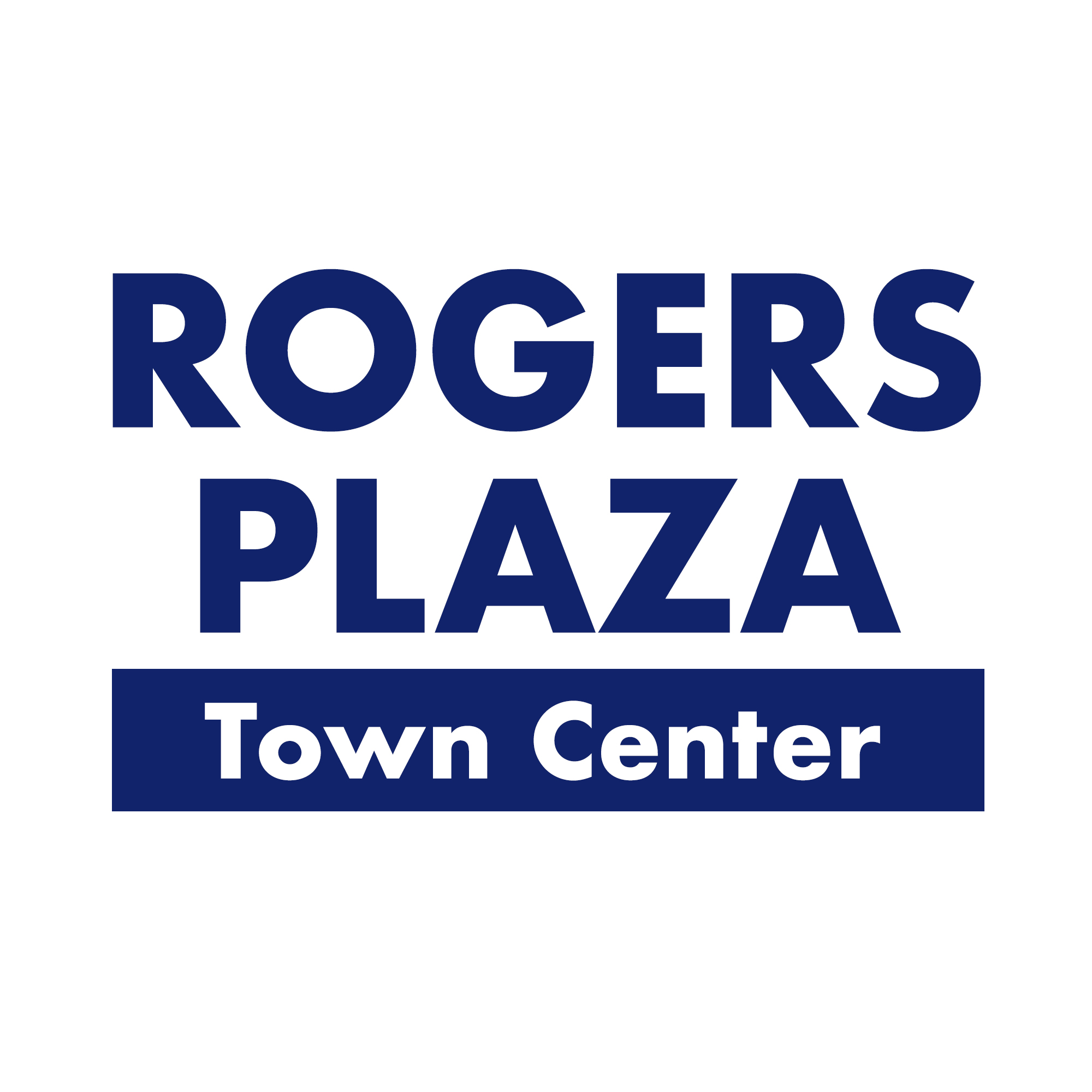

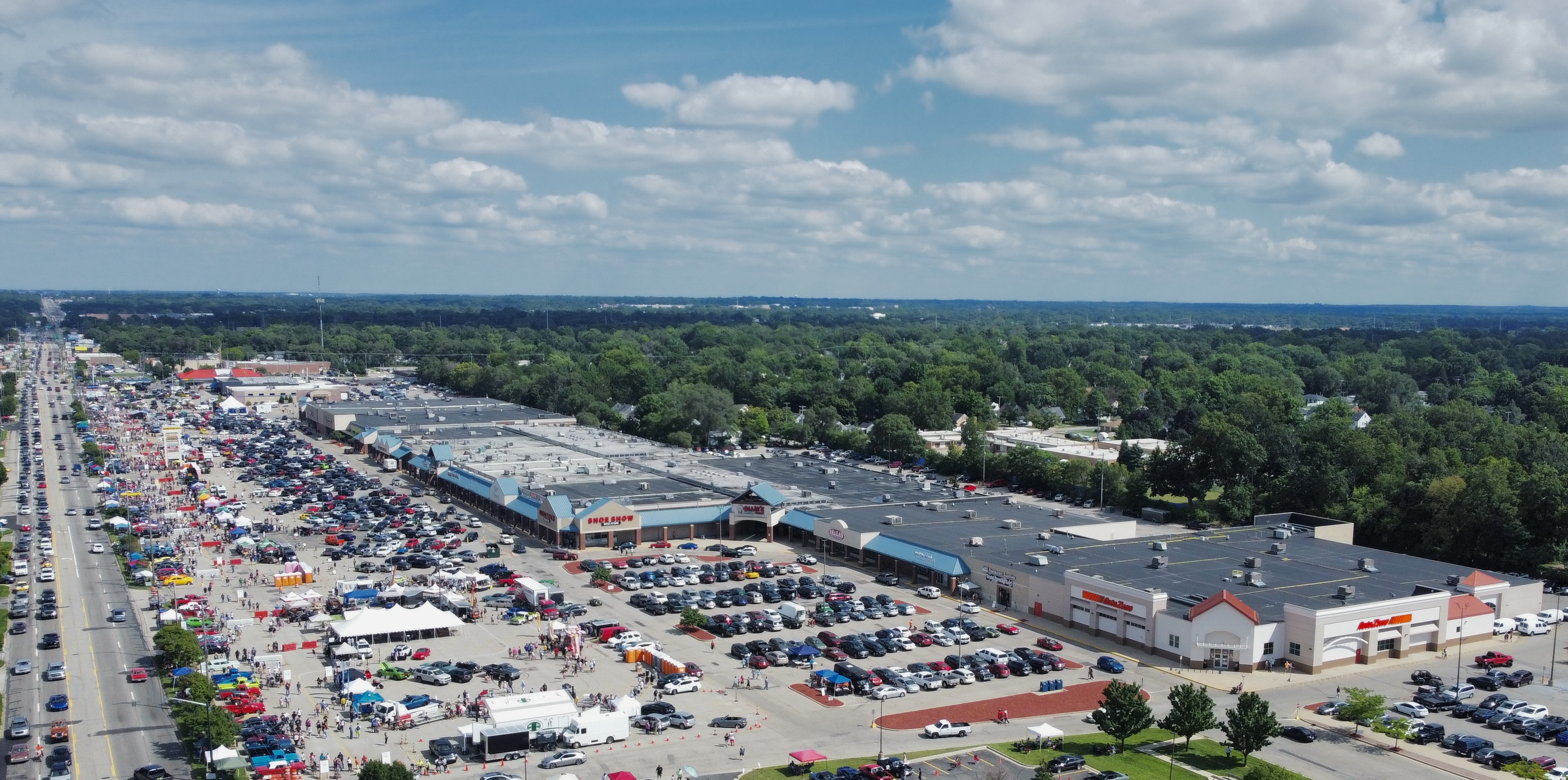
- Rogers Plaza during the 28th Street Metro Cruise
- Location: Wyoming, Michigan, U.S.
- Coordinates: 42.9123°N 85.6906°W
- Address: 972 28th Street Southwest
- Opened: August 3, 1961 (opened 65 years ago)
- Developer: Pioneer Shopping Centers, Inc.
- Owner: Spigel Properties, Inc.
- Num. of stores: 37
- Floor area: 365,572 square feet (34,000 m^{2})
- Floors: 1 (2 Previously)
- Parking: 920
- Public transit: The Rapid

Rogers Plaza, also known as Rogers Plaza Town Center, is an enclosed shopping mall in Wyoming, Michigan, United States, a suburb of Grand Rapids, Michigan. Opened in 1961, it was the first shopping mall in Western Michigan and the first enclosed one in the state of Michigan. The center features Ross Dress For Less, Ollie's Bargain Outlet, and B2 Outlet among its major stores.

== History ==
Built in 1960, the mall originally included S. S. Kresge and W. T. Grant variety stores, Kroger and A&P supermarkets, Cunningham Drug, and Montgomery Ward. An adjacent development, Southland Plaza (now Wyoming Village Mall), opened one year later with a Wurzburg's department store. Mall developers were initially unsuccessful in attracting a department store for the eastern anchor, but by 1971, a Turn Style discount store had opened on the east end. This store was the subject of a lawsuit from Kresge. Into the late 1980s, the Stannard's Music store was one of the first stores in the area to introduce the public to the MIDI, giving seminars on the capability of the device.

=== Basement Community Center ===
In the early 1960s history of Rogers Plaza there was a Basement level accessible via a spiral staircase at the south entrance. Initially this Downstairs Community Center housed the Vega Dance Studio which opened on January 7, 1963. Eventually this space was closed in the 1980s and is no longer available to lease. The door to the stairway still exists at the south entrance, along with a second entrance next to CitiTrends at the west end of the mall. Currently the basement houses utility access and room for a storm shelter.

=== Downturn and fire ===
By the 1990s, the mall was having difficulty attracting business. In 1990, the mall's east anchor had become Best Products and in 1990 and 1991, the mall held a "Haunted Hotel" event, sponsored by Easter Seals, near Halloween. In 1991, a fire in the Best store resulted in three people hospitalized for smoke inhalation. In 1994, Office Max became a tenant replacing Bargain Books, with the bookstore moving into a smaller space. while Gantos, a boutique, closed. In 1998, a United States Postal Service store opened in the center of the mall. Rogers Plaza had a total of 30 retail stores in 1999 with the mall "filling up fast", with the former space used by Best being filled. However, much of the mall's business was taken by the newly opened Rivertown Crossings Mall in Grandville.

=== Sale and renovation ===
Into the 2000s, Ward's closed in December 2000 with 140 employees losing their jobs while the mall was sold in May 2000 to a new owner. In 2001 and 2002, the mall underwent a 14-month renovation project. As part of the renovation, the vacated Montgomery Ward was demolished for a Family Fare supermarket and AJ Wright discount store. In 2002, a redevelopment plan presented by the City of Wyoming included a street leading west from the mall, across Michael Avenue through Wyoming Village Mall and ending at Studio 28, with businesses and apartments anticipated to be constructed along the street. The project never launched as the owners of Wyoming Village Mall disagreed with demolishing a portion of their mall for the street.

AJ Wright closed in February 2011 and became CW Price in August of the same year. The mall was purchased by Sun Valley Ltd. in June 2012. At the time, other major tenants included Big Lots, Harbor Freight Tools, Citi Trends, and OfficeMax. In June 2019, Family Fare was closed down and the space is going to be auctioned off while OfficeMax closed shortly after. An AutoZone took over the space shortly after.

=== Current status ===
In 2022 the previous owner of the property Sun Valley Ltd. ended operations and was merged with the current owner Spigel Properties, Inc. As of September 2023 the mall is 85% occupied with the closure of the Kings Room barbershop. The mall is still a vital part of the 28th Street Metro Cruise event held every year in its main parking lot at the end of August. A recent addition is Ross Dress For Less which opened in the summer of 2023. Ross joins AutoZone, Planet Fitness, Harbor Freight Tools, Ollie's Bargain Outlet, The US Post Office and Secretary of State offices, and several other business in the center.
