= Main Art Theater =

Former historic movie theater in Royal Oak, Michigan, USA

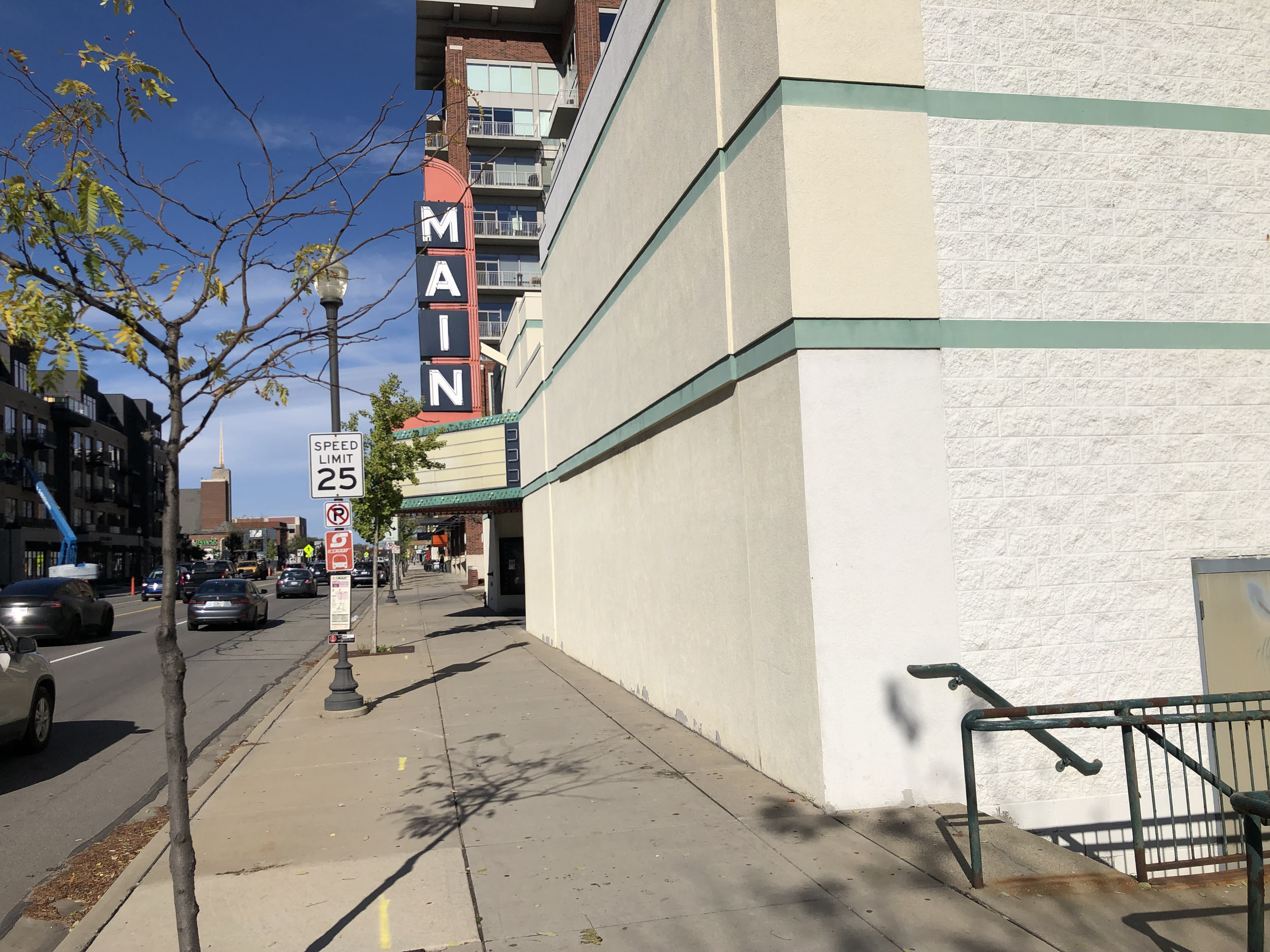
- The Main Art in October 2021
- Interactive map of Main Art Theater
- Address: 118 N. Main Street; Royal Oak, Michigan; 48067
- Coordinates: 42°29′25″N 83°8′38″W
- Owner: A.F. Jonna Management & Development
- Operator: Jack Krass (former); Landmark Theatres (former)
- Capacity: 800 (1941)
- Type: Movie theater

Construction
- Opened: August 7, 1941
- Renovated: 1983, 1993
- Closed: June 12, 2021
- Demolished: July 25, 2022
- Architects: Bennett & Straight; Dearborn, Michigan

The Main Art Theater was a movie theater located at 118 North Main Street in downtown Royal Oak, Michigan, at the corner of Main Street and 11 Mile Road. Opened on August 7, 1941 by Robert Anthony, it was originally a single-screen theater with 800 seats designed by Dearborn-based architect Bennett & Straight. In 1983, the original 800-seat theater was split into two theaters during renovations, and a third theater was added to the building in 1993.

The Main Art specialized in art films and independent movies, and regularly held midnight showings of classic films on Friday and Saturday nights. The theater showed mainstream films prior to its arthouse renovation in 1983.

Landmark Theatres operated the Main Art from 1997 until its closure in 2021. In May 2022, A.F. Jonna Management & Development gained approval from the Royal Oak City Council to demolish the theater for a mixed-use building. The Main Art was officially demolished on the afternoon of July 25, 2022.

== History ==
The Main Art Theater was first opened in 1941 by Robert Anthony as the Main Theater, which was a single-screen, 800-seat theater that specialized in mainstream films. In 1983, renovations and changes were done, which included the original single-screen theater being split in two to make two separate theaters. This was when the Main Art began to show art films and independent films. A third theater was added to the building in 1993. In 1997, Landmark Theatres took over the Main Art and operated it until its closure. In 1999, the Main Art was one of only 15 theaters in North America showing The Blair Witch Project, and every show on the schedule was sold out with people coming from as far away as Indiana and upstate New York to see the movie. As part of Landmark's Midnight Madness series, the Main Art also specialized in midnight showings of classic films from the early 20th century to present day such as North by Northwest, The Goonies, and cult films like Tommy Wiseau's The Room.

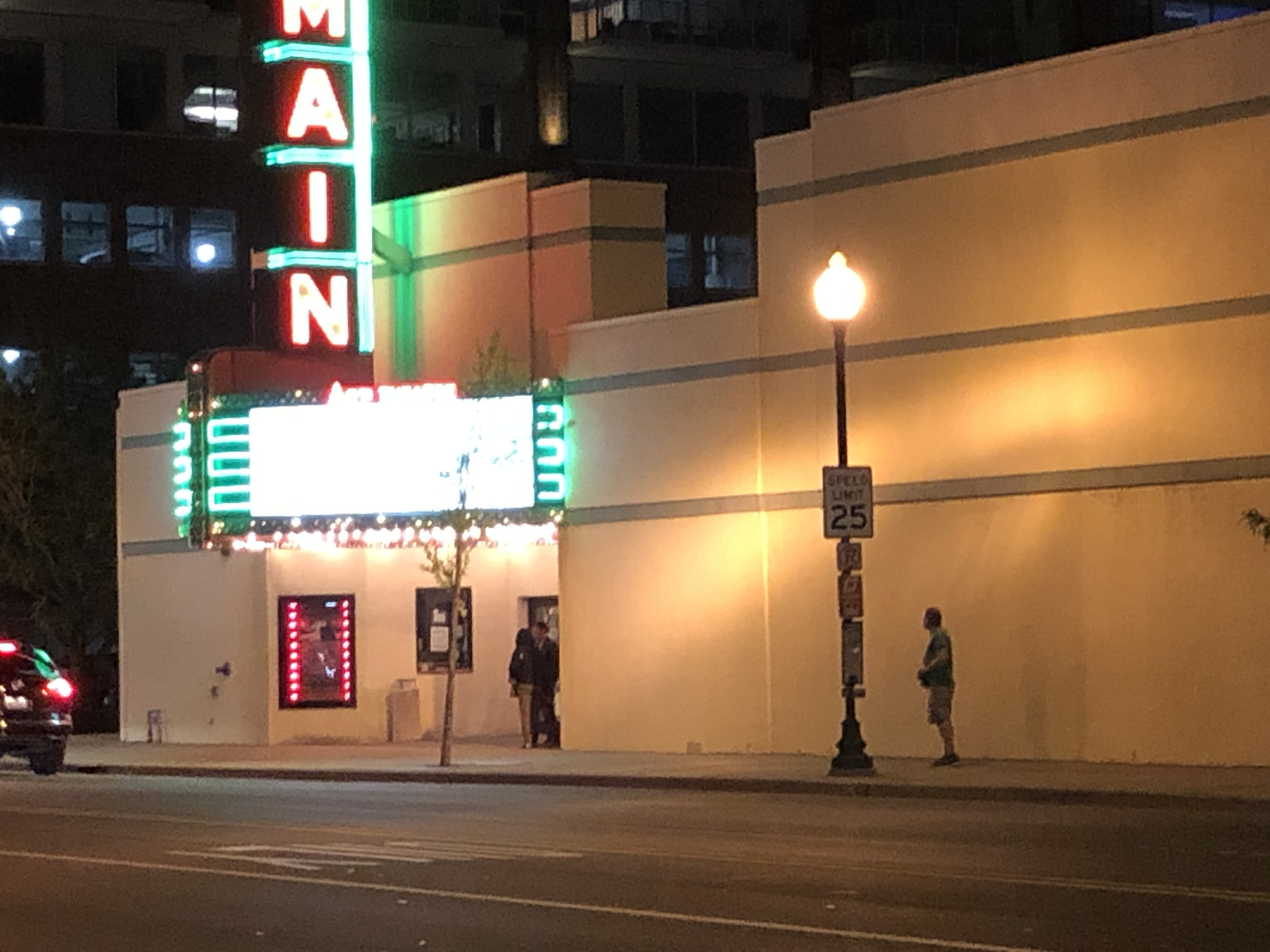
The Main Art Theater at night with the marquee on in June 2019

Due to the COVID-19 pandemic, the Main Art temporarily closed its doors in March 2020 before reopening on Christmas Day later that year. In April 2021, the Main Art closed temporarily once again due to financial constraints. On June 12, 2021, the Main Art closed down permanently when Landmark Theatres ended their lease of the building and returned the property to A.F. Jonna Management & Development. Immediately after its closure, a nonprofit group called Friends of Main Art Theater formed with the intention of preserving the theater; the group's goal, according to the site description, "is to foster and develop public appreciation of independent film and the arts, and to preserve the Royal Oak Main Art building as a movie theater for the enjoyment of the greater Metro Detroit community."

However, in May 2022, the Royal Oak City Council voted to allow A.F. Jonna Management & Development to demolish the Main Art and construct a mixed-use apartment complex on the theater site with the theater's old marquee. The Main Art was officially demolished on the afternoon of July 25, 2022.

== Photo gallery ==
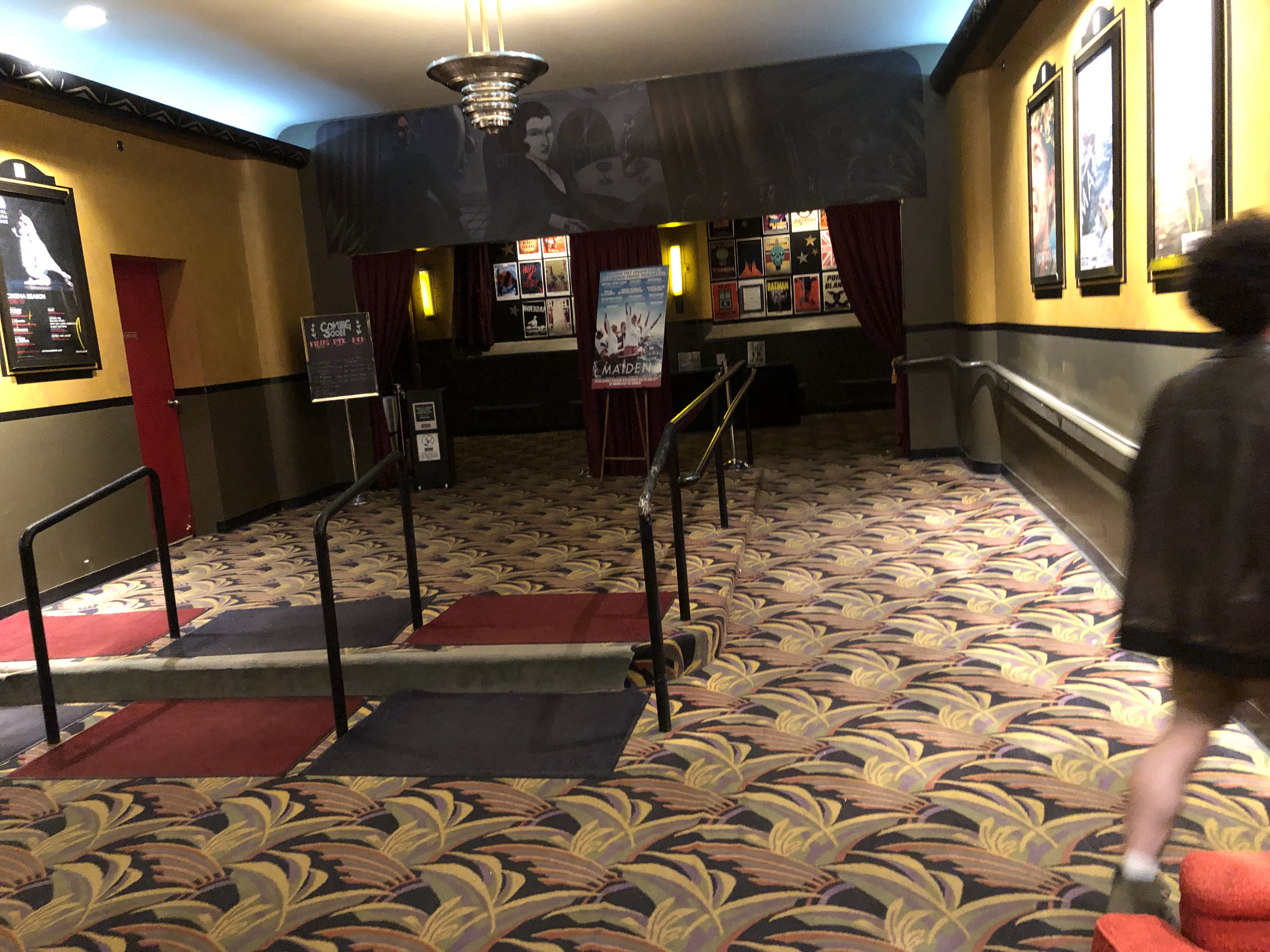
The main lobby of the Main Art in June 2019

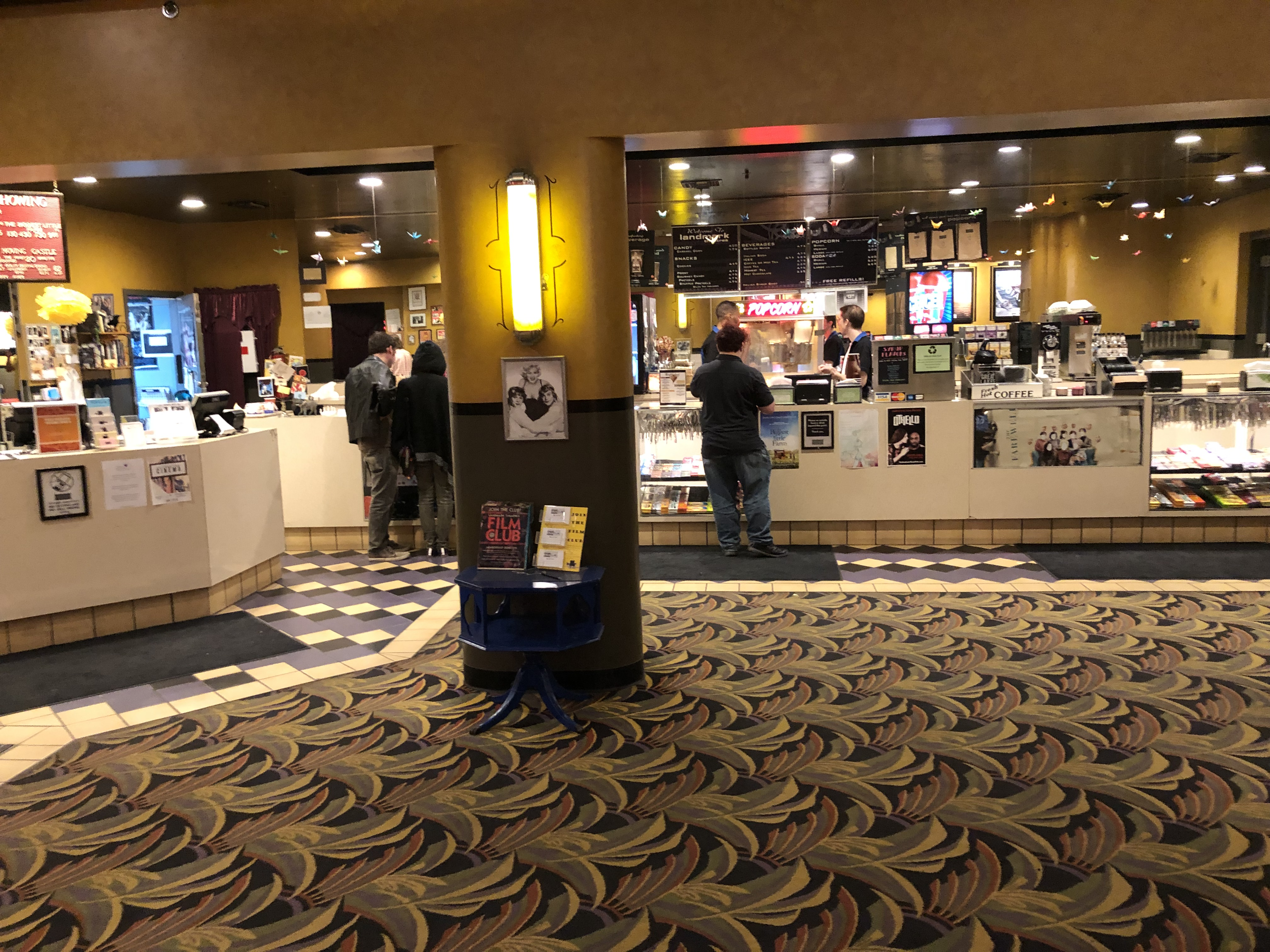
The ticket booth and snack stand in June 2019

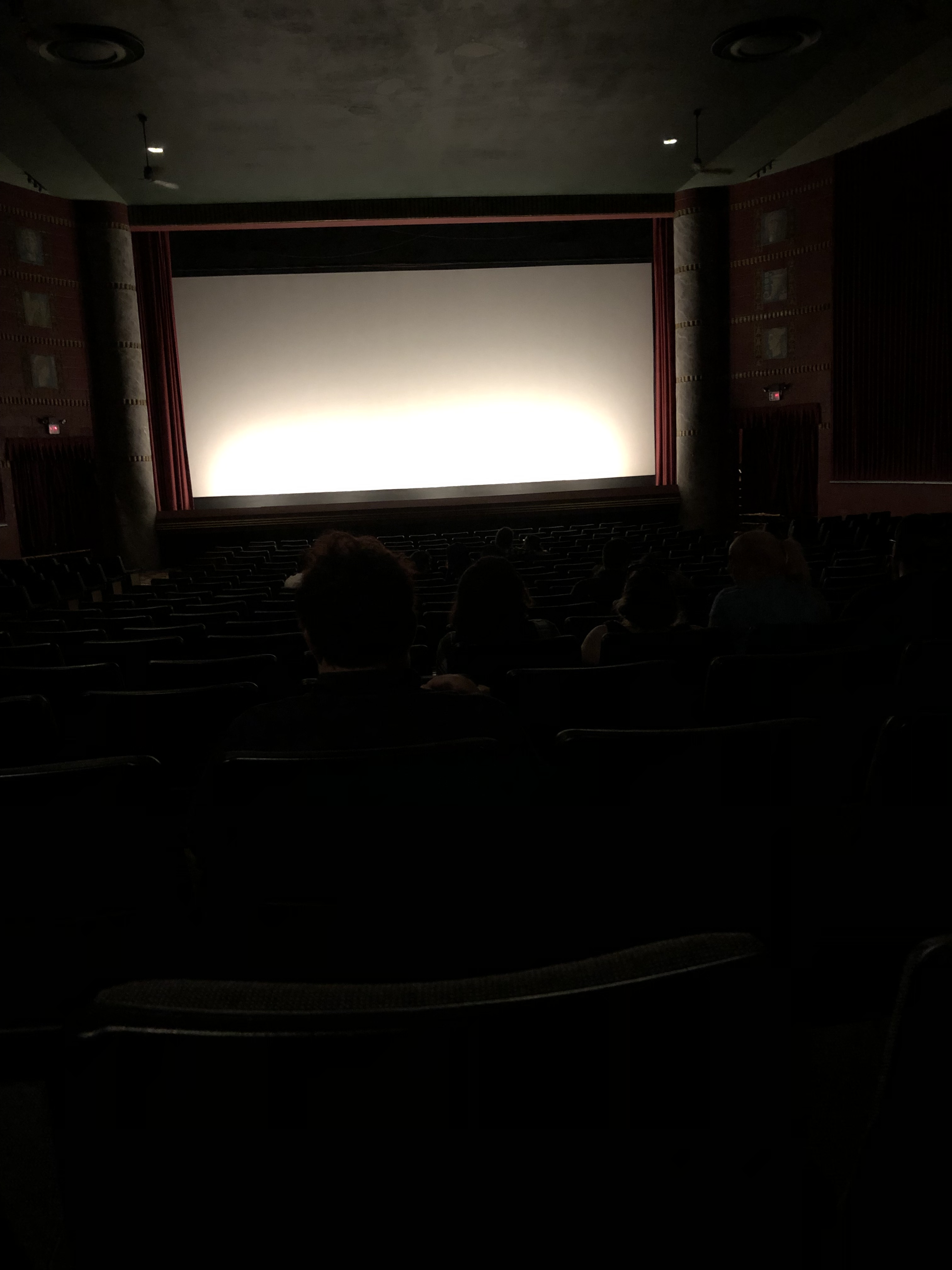
Theater 1 during a midnight screening of Howl's Moving Castle in June 2019

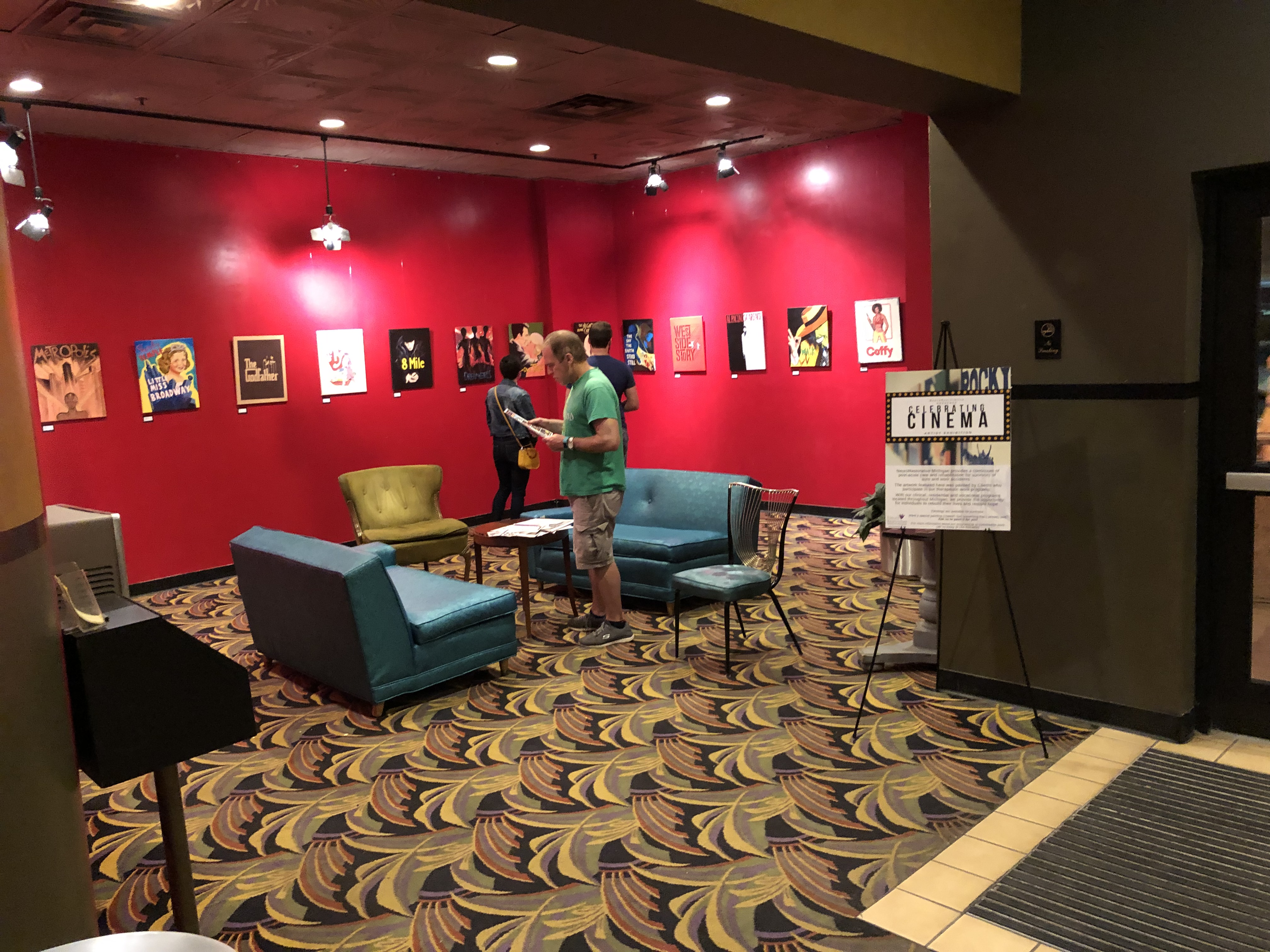
The sitting room in June 2019

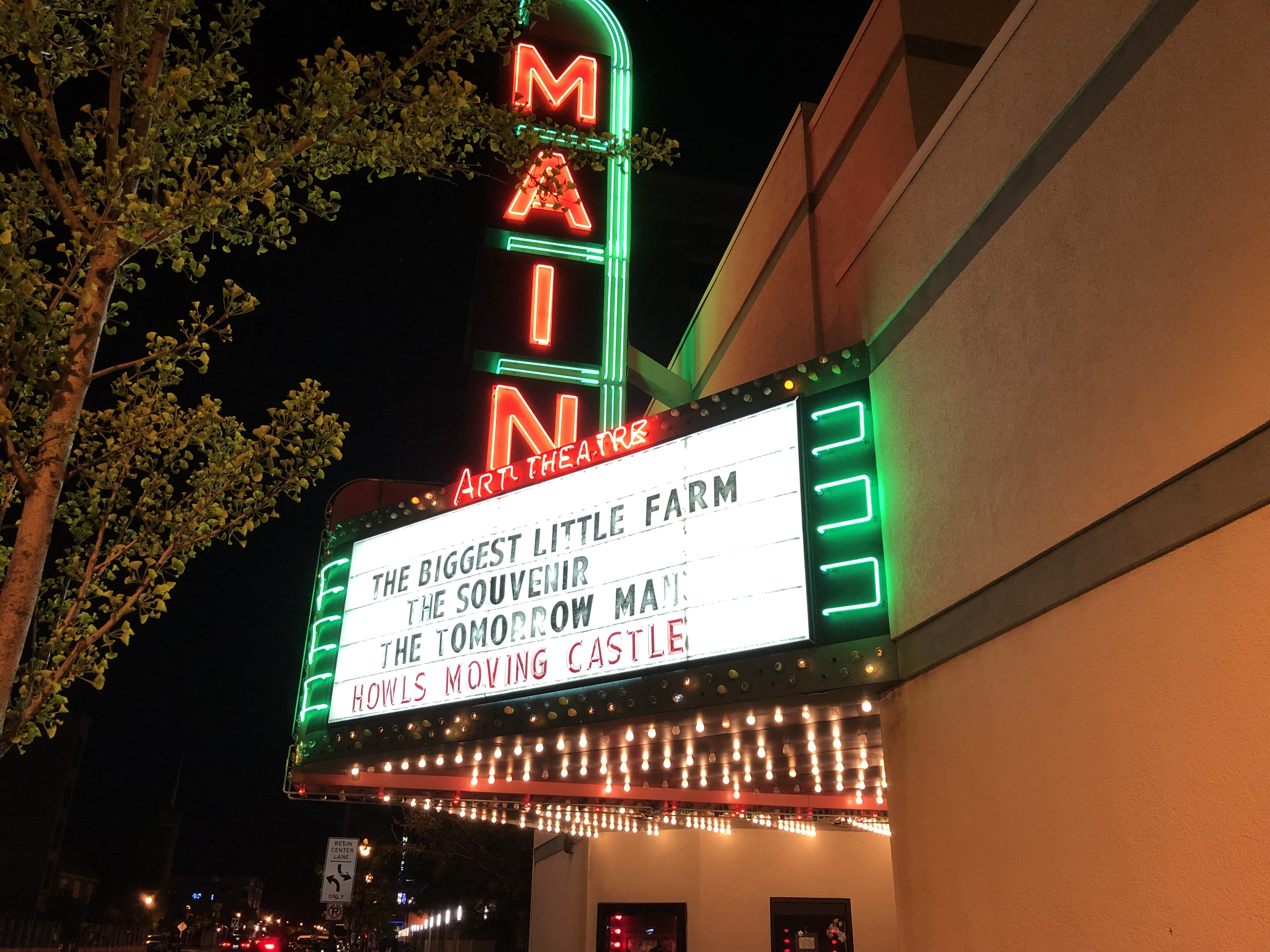
The Main Art's marquee in June 2019

== See also ==
- Berkley Theater
