= Phyfe =

Phyfe is a surname. Notable people with the surname include:

- Duncan Phyfe (1768–1854), American cabinetmaker
- Owain Phyfe (1949–2012), American vocalist, instrumentalist, and composer
- Hal Phyfe (1892–1968), American portrait photographer
