= Fyffe =

Fyffe may refer to:

- Fyffe (surname)
- Fyffe, Alabama, a town in DeKalb County, Alabama, in the United States

== See also ==
- Fyffes, a European fruit company
- Fyfe
- Fife (disambiguation)
