= Berkley, Michigan =

- City
- City of Berkley
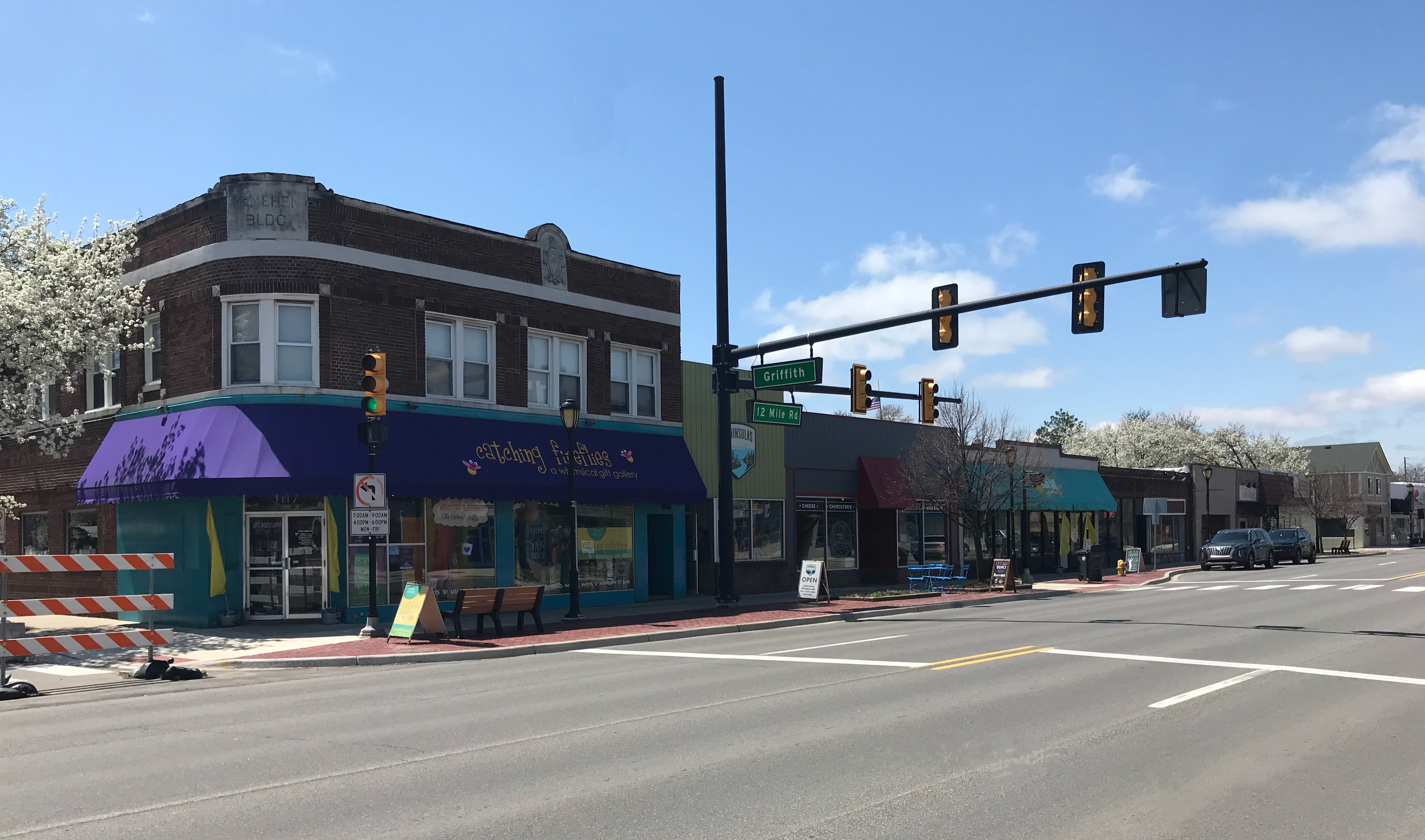
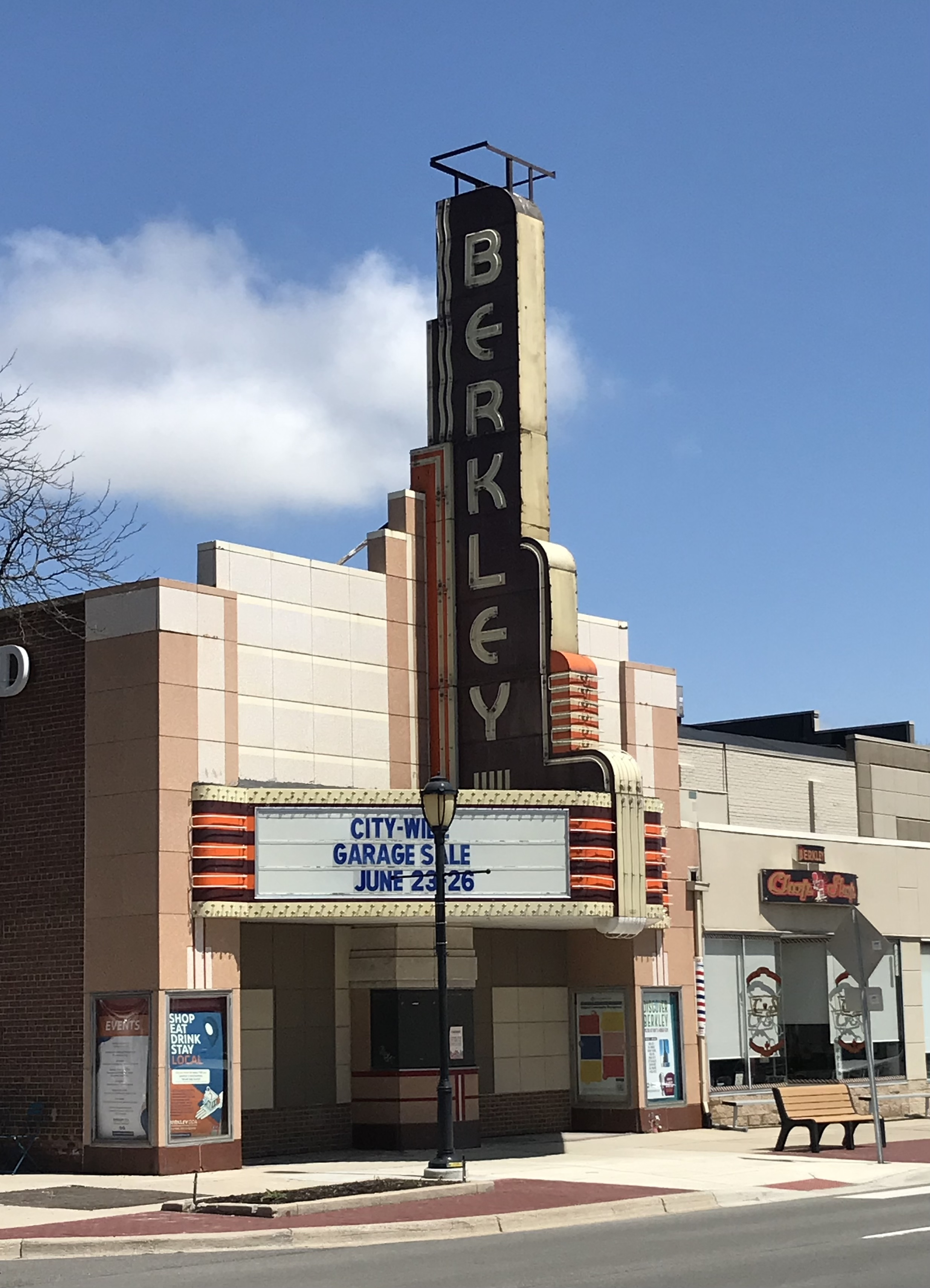
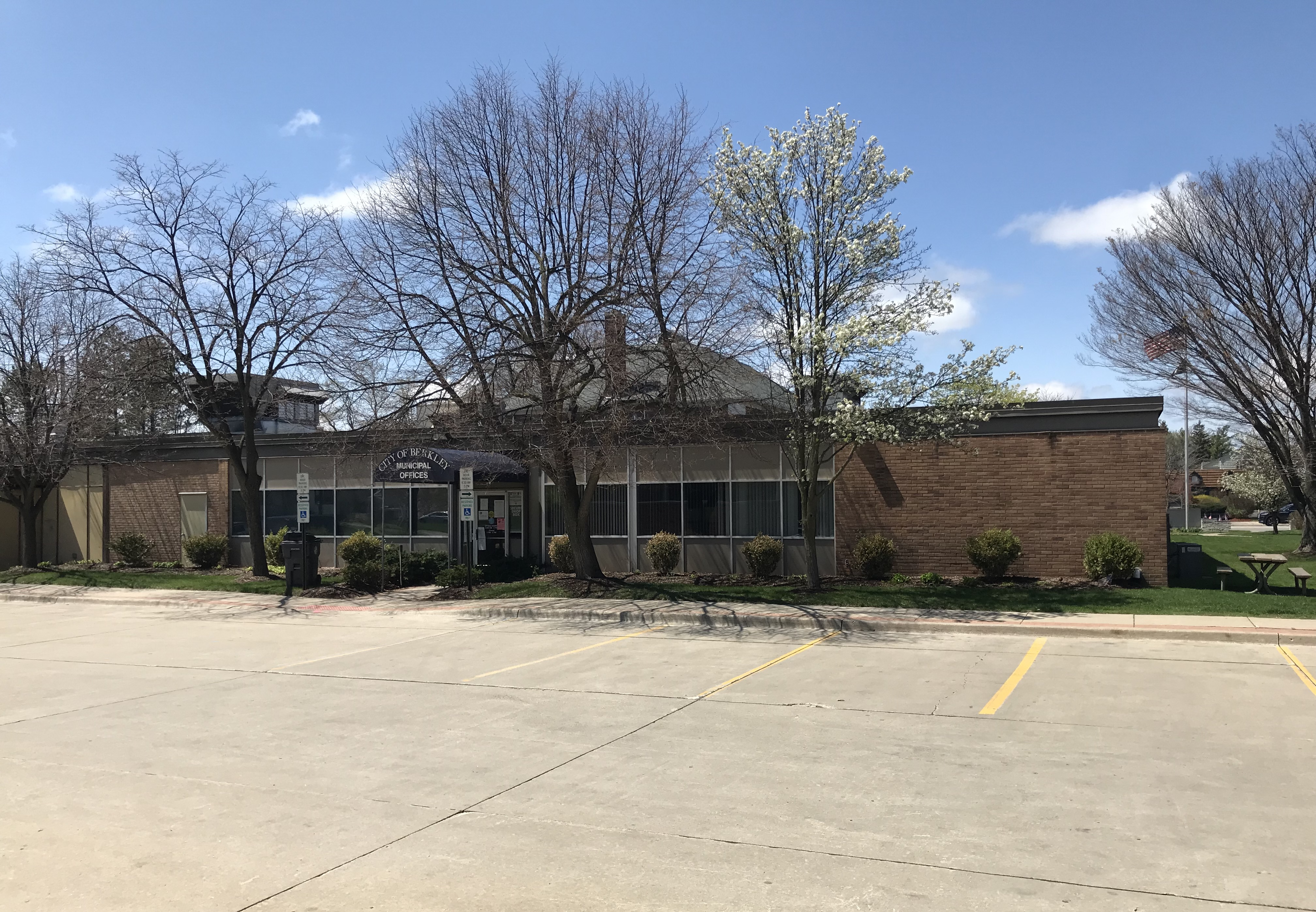
- Downtown Berkley along Twelve Mile Road and Berkley City Hall

- Seal
- Motto: We Care
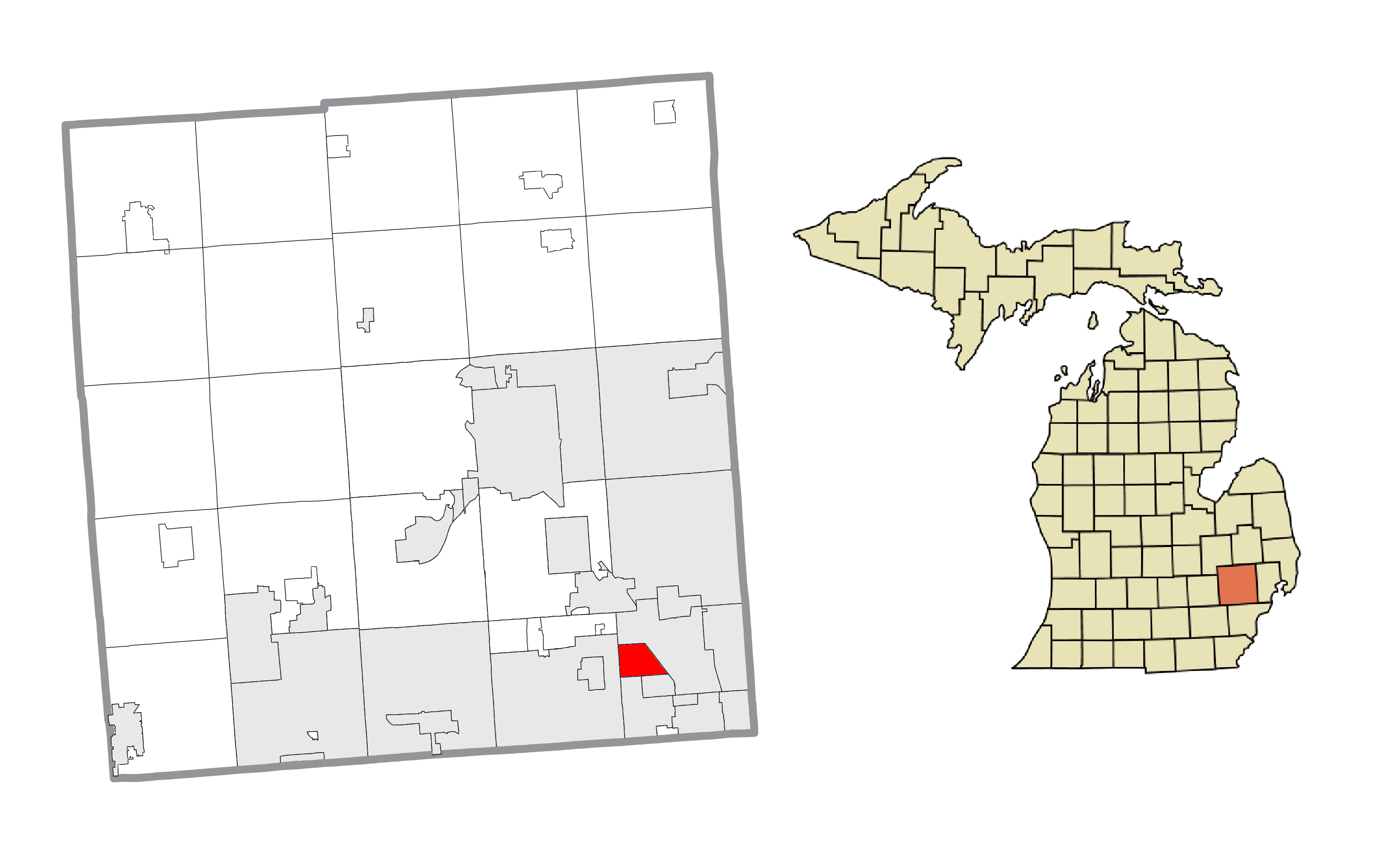
- Location within Oakland County

- Location within the state of Michigan Location within the United States
- Coordinates: 42°30′11″N 83°11′01″W
- Country: United States
- State: Michigan
- County: Oakland
- Incorporated: 1923 (village); 1932 (city)

Government
  - Type: Council–manager
  - Mayor: Bridget Dean
  - Manager: Crystal VanVleck

Area
  - City: 2.61 sq mi (6.77 km^{2})
  - Land: 2.61 sq mi (6.77 km^{2})
  - Water: 0 sq mi (0.00 km^{2})
- Elevation: 686 ft (209 m)

Population (2020)
  - City: 15,194
  - Density: 5,810.6/sq mi (2,243.47/km^{2})
  - Metro: 4,296,250 (Metro Detroit)
- Time zone: UTC-5 (EST)
  - Summer (DST): UTC-4 (EDT)
- ZIP code(s): 48072
- Area code: 248
- FIPS code: 26-07660
- GNIS feature ID: 0621157
- Website: www.berkleymi.gov

Berkley is a city in Oakland County in the U.S. state of Michigan. A northern suburb of Detroit on the Woodward Corridor, Berkley is located roughly 14 miles (22.5 km) northwest of downtown Detroit. As of the 2020 census, the city had a population of 15,194.

== History ==
Prior to settlement, the land which would become Berkley consisted largely of dense forests and some isolated pockets of swampland. Many in the region deemed the areas north and west of Detroit uninhabitable or impassible due to the harshness of the swamps beyond Detroit, but as adventurers pushed out through the interminable swamp, favorable land was discovered, which led to a flock of people to the lands of modern Royal Oak. Land in what would later become Berkley began being sold to farmers who cut down forests and otherwise prepared the land for farming. By the 1840s, Berkley contained a great number of dairy farms. The 1910s brought significant growth to the area with the completion of the Highland Park Ford Plant. As farms were sold and turned into subdivisions, there was pressure to formally incorporate the land. In 1923, Berkley was incorporated as a village. At the time, Elmer Cromie had named the road that ran through his farm "Berkley", and the "Berkley School" was then under construction, so the name Berkley was chosen for the village.

The Wall Street Crash of 1929 brought growth in Berkley to a halt. Roughly 90% of the 5,558 residents in Berkley lost their jobs when the market crashed. Within a year, the city's population was dropping and in 1932 voters chose to incorporate their Village into a City to gain more oversight over taxes and other issues facing the community. In the 1940s, suburbanization and the post-war boom economy drove significant development in the area. The current Berkley High School was built in 1949. The city reached a population peak of 23,375 in 1960. In 1993, the Berkley Theater, long a symbol of moviegoers in the area, closed down and became a Rite Aid drug store. Which has since closed down again in late 2024.

=== Berkley Center ===
In July 1964, an enclosed shopping mall was planned to be built, stretching east to west from Coolidge Highway to Kipling Avenue, and north to south from 12 Mile Rd to Wiltshire Rd. The plan would involve buying and demolishing 114 homes and businesses. The plan eventually collapsed.

== Culture ==
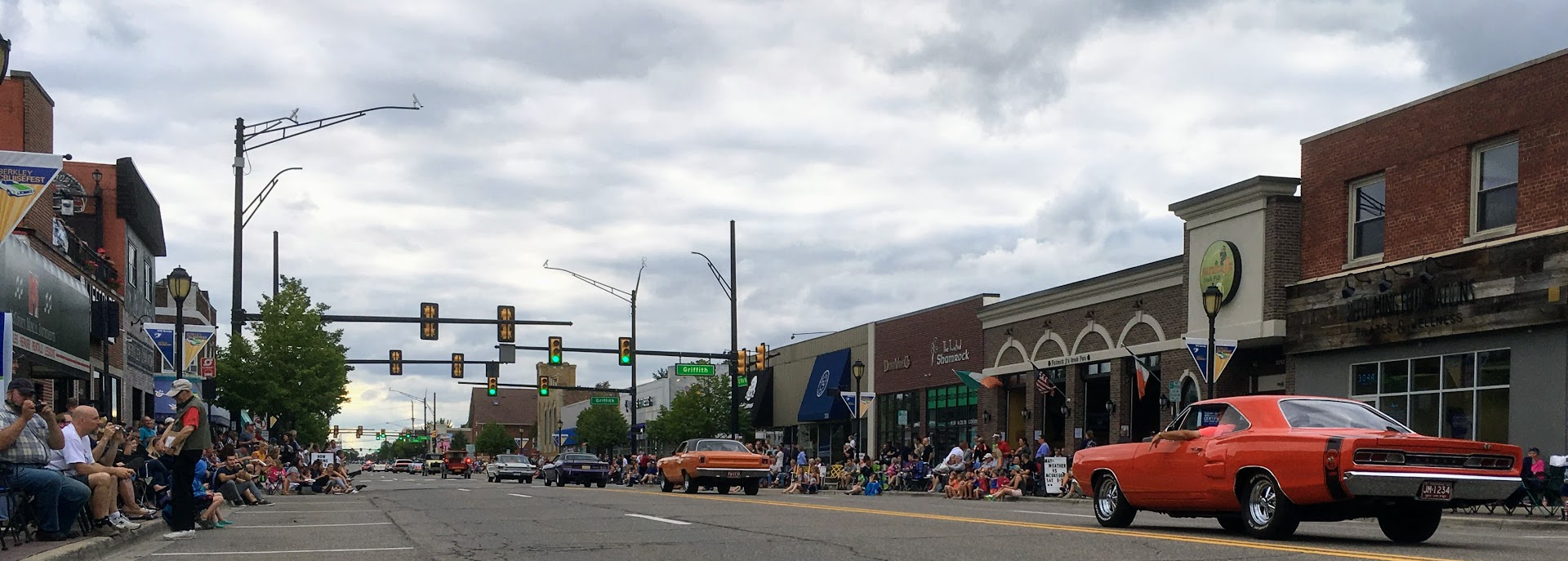
2017 Berkley CruiseFest, 12 Mile Road

Downtown Berkley stretches along 12 Mile Road between Greenfield Road and Coolidge Highway, and along Coolidge Highway between 12 Mile Road and 11 Mile Road. Downtown Berkley is home to many restaurants, boutiques, clothing stores, and retail shops. Berkley's municipal offices, public library, and public safety headquarters are located near the intersection of 12 Mile Road and Coolidge Highway. Downtown Berkley hosts an annual Art Bash, which drew roughly 10,000 people to the city's commercial sector in 2016. The Art Bash brings local artists from all over Michigan to sell art from photographs, garden art, jewelry and pottery to clothing accessories and paintings. Local stores and shops also participate in the festivities holding sidewalk sales. The city is an active participant in the annual Woodward Dream Cruise, a popular classic car showcase in the Metro Detroit area. Berkley hosts a classic car parade Downtown, called the Berkley CruiseFest. It holds the festivities one day before the official date of the Dream Cruise, and has done so every year since 1995.

In addition to the Downtown festivities, the city holds an annual Summerfest and Winterfest through the city Parks and Recreation department and partnerships with volunteers and community organizations. The City of Berkley is home to many neighborhood parks and a large central community center, which is located on Robina Avenue, just off of Catalpa Drive and directly east of Anderson Middle School. For decades, Berkley Parks and Recreation operated an ice arena at their central facility, but this was closed in 2016 due to a coolant leak in the facility. In 2019, the Berkley Ice Arena was demolished.

The city of Berkley was planned and exists as an inner-ring suburb of Detroit. The majority of its streets connect on a grid pattern and typical lots are small by suburban standards. This is viewed by the residents as fostering a tight-knit community. This has led to the community becoming an increasingly popular suburb, being among the healthiest housing markets in Michigan and the United States, but despite this Berkley is still considered affordable by Money.com, which rated Berkley as the 28th-best place to live for the money, in the United States due to its "small-town feel" within Metro Detroit and its "easily walkable downtown".

== Geography ==
Berkley lies within Southeastern Oakland County. It is adjacent to the cities of Huntington Woods and Oak Park to the south, Southfield to the west, and Royal Oak to the north and east.

Berkley is bordered by Woodward Avenue (M-1) on the east, Webster Road on the North, Greenfield Road on the west, and 11 Mile Road on the south. The southern border of the city is 3 miles north of the Detroit city limits, which are bounded by Eight Mile Road. Berkley is intersected by 12 Mile Road and Coolidge Highway, and though no Interstates run through the city, Interstate 75 and Interstate 696 are major thoroughfares near the city. According to the United States Census Bureau, the city has a total area of 2.62 square miles (6.79 km^{2}), all land.

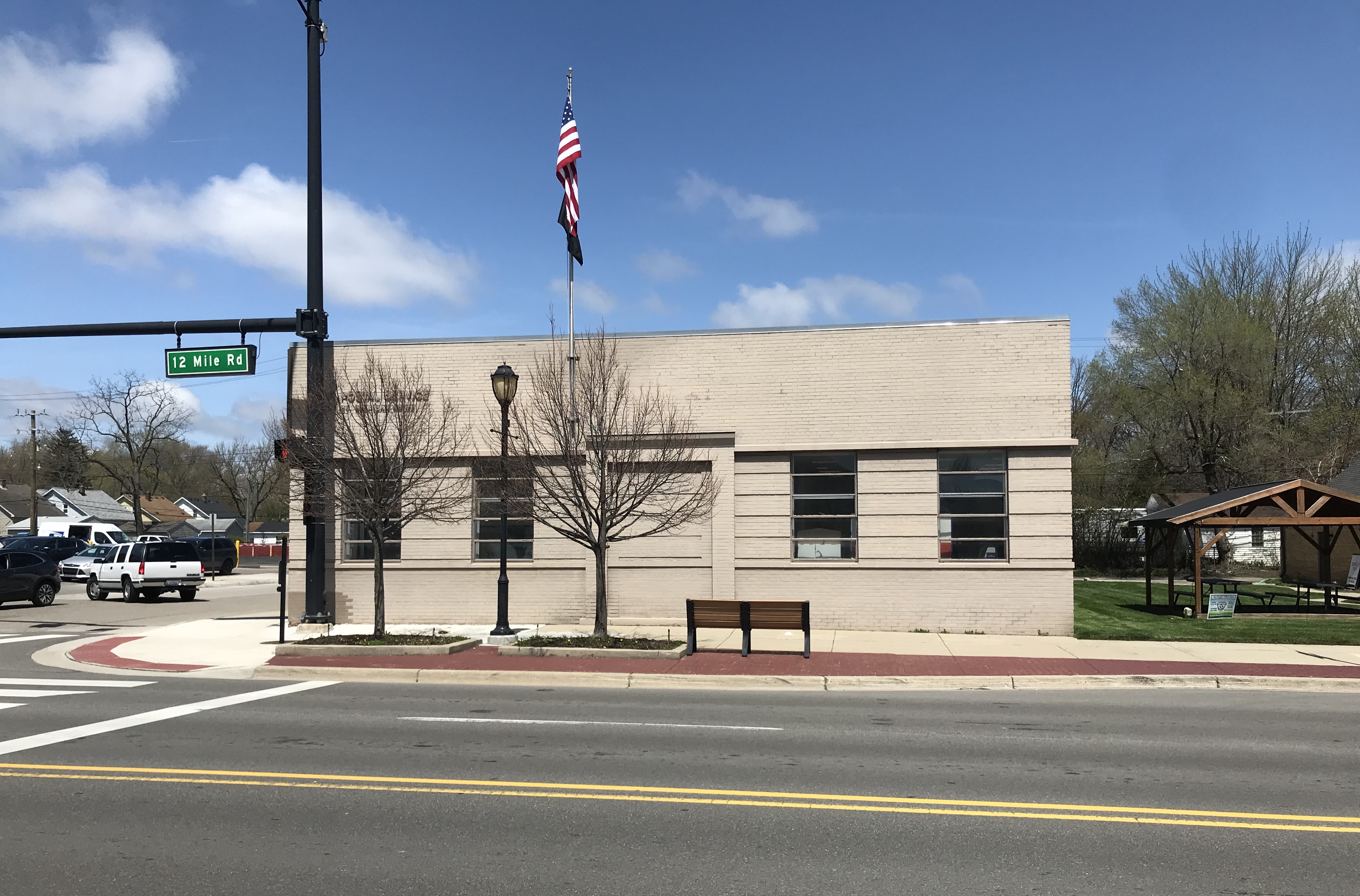
United States Post Office, Berkley MI

== Demographics ==
Historical population
Census	Pop.	Note	%±
1930	5,571		—
1940	6,406		15.0%
1950	17,931		179.9%
1960	23,275		29.8%
1970	21,879		−6.0%
1980	18,637		−14.8%
1990	16,960		−9.0%
2000	15,531		−8.4%
2010	14,970		−3.6%
2020	15,194		1.5%
U.S. Decennial Census

=== 2020 census ===
As of the 2020 census, Berkley had a population of 15,194. The median age was 37.6 years. 20.2% of residents were under the age of 18 and 13.8% of residents were 65 years of age or older. For every 100 females there were 94.1 males, and for every 100 females age 18 and over there were 92.3 males age 18 and over.

100.0% of residents lived in urban areas, while 0.0% lived in rural areas.

There were 6,728 households in Berkley, of which 27.0% had children under the age of 18 living in them. Of all households, 46.8% were married-couple households, 18.1% were households with a male householder and no spouse or partner present, and 27.6% were households with a female householder and no spouse or partner present. About 31.9% of all households were made up of individuals and 11.7% had someone living alone who was 65 years of age or older.

There were 6,996 housing units, of which 3.8% were vacant. The homeowner vacancy rate was 1.3% and the rental vacancy rate was 4.9%.

Racial composition as of the 2020 census
Race	Number	Percent
White	13,512	88.9%
Black or African American	346	2.3%
American Indian and Alaska Native	26	0.2%
Asian	269	1.8%
Native Hawaiian and Other Pacific Islander	0	0.0%
Some other race	87	0.6%
Two or more races	954	6.3%
Hispanic or Latino (of any race)	442	2.9%

=== 2021 American Community Survey ===
According to the 2021 American Community Survey, the median age in Berkley was 37.2 years. 3.7% of the population was foreign born, and veterans accounted for 4.7% of the population. The median household income was $96,993, and 4.3% of the population lived below the poverty line.

=== 2010 census ===
As of the census of 2010, there were 14,970 people, 6,594 households, and 3,896 families residing in the city. The population density was 5,713.7 inhabitants per square mile (2,206.1/km^{2}). There were 6,933 housing units at an average density of 2,646.2 per square mile (1,021.7/km^{2}). The racial makeup of the city was 93.3% White, 3.0% African American, 0.3% Native American, 1.3% Asian, 0.1% Pacific Islander, 0.3% from other races, and 1.8% from two or more races. Hispanic or Latino residents of any race were 1.8% of the population.

There were 6,594 households, of which 28.0% had children under the age of 18 living with them, 45.7% were married couples living together, 9.7% had a female householder with no husband present, 3.6% had a male householder with no wife present, and 40.9% were non-families. 33.6% of all households were made up of individuals, and 10.5% had someone living alone who was 65 years of age or older. The average household size was 2.27 and the average family size was 2.95.

The median age in the city was 37.9 years. 21.4% of residents were under the age of 18; 6.1% were between the ages of 18 and 24; 33.7% were from 25 to 44; 27.3% were from 45 to 64; and 11.3% were 65 years of age or older. The gender makeup of the city was 47.9% male and 52.1% female.

=== 2000 census ===
As of the census of 2000, there were 15,531 people, 6,678 households, and 4,020 families residing in the city. The population density was 5,925.5 inhabitants per square mile (2,287.8/km^{2}). There were 6,833 housing units at an average density of 2,607.0 per square mile (1,006.6/km^{2}). The racial makeup of the city was 96.09% White, 0.70% African American, 0.24% Native American, 1.03% Asian, 0.01% Pacific Islander, 0.40% from other races, and 1.53% from two or more races. Hispanic or Latino residents of any race were 1.31% of the population.

There were 6,678 households, out of which 27.7% had children under the age of 18 living with them, 48.1% were married couples living together, 9.2% had a female householder with no husband present, and 39.8% were non-families. 32.5% of all households were made up of individuals, and 11.3% had someone living alone who was 65 years of age or older. The average household size was 2.32 and the average family size was 3.01.

In the city, 22.8% of the population was under the age of 18, 6.4% was from 18 to 24, 38.2% from 25 to 44, 19.7% from 45 to 64, and 12.9% was 65 years of age or older. The median age was 36 years. For every 100 females, there were 93.1 males. For every 100 females age 18 and over, there were 88.8 males.

The median income for a household in the city was $57,620, and the median income for a family was $66,968. Males had a median income of $50,276 versus $36,624 for females. The per capita income for the city was $27,504. About 2.5% of families and 3.6% of the population were below the poverty line, including 4.0% of those under age 18 and 3.8% of those age 65 or over.

== Schools ==
The Berkley School District operates in almost all of Berkley, all of Huntington Woods, and the north section of Oak Park. The school district includes four elementary schools (Angell, Burton, Pattengill, and Rogers), one Kindergarten-8th grade school (Norup International), one solely middle school (Anderson), and one high school (Berkley High School). From 2008 to 2016, Berkley High School has been named by Newsweek on its list of 1,000 Best High Schools in the nation. In 2008, it ranked among the top six in Michigan, and in 2017 The Washington Post rated it as one of the most challenging high schools in the nation, making it one of three Oakland County high schools to earn the distinction. Norup became an International Baccalaureate Candidate school in 2006 implementing the Primary Years Programme (PYP) and Middle Years Programme (MYP) for all students. Homeowners in the first block west of Woodward and in the first five streets north of Eleven Mile Road are serviced by the Royal Oak Public Schools.

A former elementary school, Avery, was converted into the Berkley School District's Building Blocks program for infants through pre-school. The program is nationally accredited, one of among only 8% accredited centers in the country. Building Blocks was previously housed at Tyndall Center, which now serves as the district board office. In 2015, Pattengill was placed on the list of National Blue Ribbon School's. Angell is currently the oldest continuously operating elementary school in Oakland County, having opened in 1921. For decades, Berkley School District has been the principal employer in the city, with 718 employees as of 2021.

Another former school, Our Lady of La Salette School, was established in 1943. Initially 100 students attended. Beginning in 1947, the school building opened in three phases, with completion in 1953. In the 1960s it had over 1,000 students, its highest number ever. From the 2008–2009 school year until the 2012–2013 school year the student body numbers declined by 47%, with the final student count at 73. It closed in 2013. In 2018, Berkley city council rejected a proposal to convert the building into apartments. This decision was later reversed, and the building reopened as The Ivy in 2023.

== Notable people ==
- Curtis Armstrong, actor (Booger in the Revenge of the Nerds movies; Herbert Viola on Moonlighting, Ahmet Ertegün in Ray); graduated from Berkley High School
- Joseph Bruce, rapper and producer (Insane Clown Posse); born in Berkley
- Marshall Crenshaw, singer, songwriter, and actor (Someday, Someway); portrayed Buddy Holly in La Bamba; graduated from Berkley High School (1971)
- Bruce Flowers, pro basketball player selected by Cleveland Cavaliers 26th overall in 1979 NBA draft, had most of his success overseas, playing for Italian squads; graduated from Berkley High School
- J. Fred Lawton, lyricist, poet, and businessman; closely associated with University of Michigan, produced "Varsity," which became a University of Michigan fight song, and played football under legendary coach Fielding H. Yost; lived in Berkley
- Sander Levin, U.S. Congressman, first Chairman of Berkley Democratic Club, played instrumental role in building Berkley Public Library
- Katherine Nye, Olympic weightlifter lives in Berkley
- Owain Phyfe, musician and producer; lived in Berkley
- Jim Seymour, wide receiver for Notre Dame and Chicago Bears; born in Berkley
- Jim Starlin, comic book artist and novelist; graduated from Berkley High School (1967)
- Rob Tyner, lead singer for proto-punk band MC5; lived and died in Berkley
- Aric Morris, former NFL safety (Tennessee Titans, New England Patriots), Super Bowl XXXVIII champion; graduated from Berkley High School (1996)

== See also ==
- Woodward Corridor
