= Fyfe =

Fyfe is an English given name and a surname.

Notable people with the name include:

== People with the given name ==
- Fyfe Dangerfield, (born 1980), English musician
- Fyfe Ewing, (born 1970), Northern Irish drummer
- Fyfe Robertson (1902–1987), Scottish television journalist

== People with the surname ==
- David Maxwell Fyfe, 1st Earl of Kilmuir (1900–1967), British politician and lawyer
- Iain Fyfe (born 1982), Australian footballer
- Ian Fyfe (disambiguation)
- Iona Fyfe (born 1998), Scottish singer
- James Fyfe (1942–2005), American criminologist
- Lee Fyfe (1879–1942), baseball umpire
- Liz Fyfe (born 1987), Canadian curler
- Maria Fyfe (1938–2020), Scottish politician
- Nat Fyfe (born 1991), Australian rules footballer
- Robert Fyfe (1930–2021), Scottish actor
- Theodore Fyfe (1875–1945), Scottish architect
- Tom Fyfe (1870–1947), New Zealand mountaineer
- William Fyfe (1927–2013), New Zealand geologist
- William Patrick Fyfe (born 1955), Canadian serial killer
- William Hamilton Fyfe (1878–1965), English and Canadian classics scholar
- William Baxter Collier Fyfe (1836–1882), Scottish painter

== Other uses ==
- Paul Dixon (musician), who uses the stage name fyfe

== See also ==
- Fife (disambiguation)
- Fyffe (disambiguation)
