= James Fife =

- Cause of death: Killed by his own men
- Other name: Fyff
- Years active: 1718
- Known for: Accepted the British pardon offered to pirates in 1718
- Piratical career
- Base of operations: Caribbean

James Fife (fl. 1718, occasionally spelled Fyff) was a pirate active in the Caribbean. He accepted the British pardon offered to pirates in 1718 but was killed by his own men.

== History ==
Little is known of Fife's early life. Public records show that he was active in early 1718, capturing the sloops Portsmouth and Elizabeth and two others between February and April near the Turks Islands.

Fife took his 4-gun, 10-man sloop to Puerto Rico in March to share out money and valuables, including pistols and captured bits of ambergris. Some of his pirates took a small boat to chase down a nearby canoe and Fife sailed away without them:

...On 14th March last in the evening the sloop being att anchor near Portorico (an Island belonging to the Spaniards) a conao was espied near the shoar, whereupon their boat was got ready and all the profest pirates but three went on board and put off and stood for the conao. Upon which Capt. Fife and the rest of the forced men took the opportunity and secured the three pirates and cut the cable with the intention of standing out to sea, but the sloop falling off the wrong way and the pirates in the boat judging what they in the vessel were about turn'd and stood back again, and came soe near the sloop before they could get under sail, that they fired over them with their small arms, but the gale springing up the sloop got away and went to Turks Islands...

In January 1718 Governor Woodes Rogers of the Bahamas announced a general pardon from King George I for all pirates who surrendered before September 1718. Following the example of Henry Jennings, hundreds of pirates accepted the pardon. Fife and the remaining crew who had left their fellow pirates behind tried to take the pardon as well but were too late and had to await trial.

Trial records for members of Fife's crew show that he used a number of forced men aboard his vessel, some of which were acquitted of piracy for that reason. Some time after he accepted the 1718 pardon, Fife was reportedly killed by a group of forced men from his crew.

== See also ==
- John Evans - Another pirate who was killed by his own crew.
