= Cruisin' Downriver =

- Type: Event
- Date: Last Saturday in June
- 2024 date: June 29
- 2025 date: June 28
- 2026 date: June 27
- 2027 date: June 26
- Frequency: Annual

Cruisin' Downriver is an unofficial annual event which takes place through several Detroit downriver communities and inspired by the Woodward Dream Cruise. People with vintage, classic, tricked-out, or otherwise interesting cars cruise through the main thoroughfare of Fort St M-85 to crowds of spectators lining Fort St. The Downriver Cruise takes place the last Saturday in June and widely promoted by the Southern Wayne County Regional Chamber of Commerce. The event was spearheaded by state Rep. Edward Clemente (D-Lincoln Park), who was the chamber president at the time, Craig Sochocki, the former mayor of Lincoln Park, Donald W. Thurlow, former News-Herald publisher and Evelyn Cairns, former News-Herald lifestyle editor. Cairns first conceived Cruisin' Downriver in 2000 after her son Glen stated the Woodward Dream Cruise was too far for him to take his Ford Model A. Ultimately, the first Downriver Cruise was held that year and attended by an estimated 200,000 people.

The cruise stretches between Sibley Road in Riverview and Outer Drive in Lincoln Park and additionally passes through the cities of Southgate and Wyandotte.

An official event for most of its history, each event held since 2017 has been unofficial as a result of increasing expenses incurred and lack of profits by each of the communities along the cruise route. The 2017 and 2018 events had another factor, in the form of increased traffic along Fort Street due to a prolonged partial closure of Interstate 75, which parallels Fort Street in the Downriver area, during those two years. Although I-75 had since fully reopened by the time of the 2019 edition, the event remains unofficial, and this status has allowed the 2020 edition to continue to move forward in spite of the COVID-19 pandemic.
