= Woodward Dream Cruise =

Annual automobile event in Metro Detroit

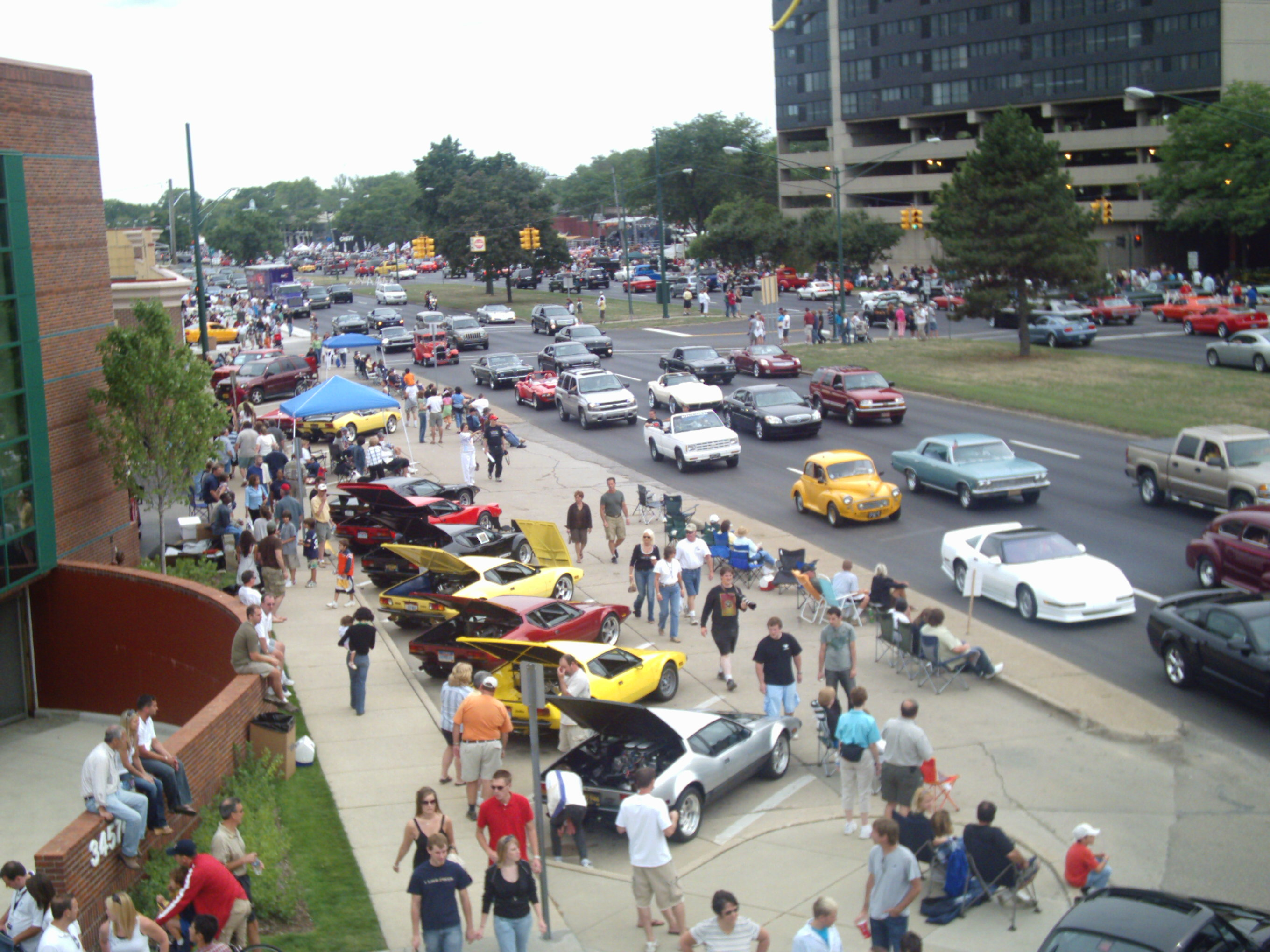
- A view of the 13th Annual Dream Cruise (2007) from atop a building located on Woodward Ave. near Maple Road (aka: 15 Mile Road) in Birmingham, MI
- Type: Event
- Date: Third Saturday in August
- 2025 date: August 16
- 2026 date: August 15
- 2027 date: August 21
- 2028 date: August 19
- Frequency: Annual

The Woodward Dream Cruise is an annual automotive enthusiast event held in the northern suburbs of Detroit. Held each year on the third Saturday in August, the Cruise runs along Woodward Avenue, a major thoroughfare in the region, from Ferndale to Pontiac.

== Background ==
Starting in 1848, when the roadway was converted from logs to planks, young carriage drivers would race along Woodward Avenue. Woodward Avenue was developed as a major street in Detroit in the early 20th century, and was lined with mansions and major churches.

By 1958, the roadway was used by youth for unofficial street racing. The wide width, median, and sections lacking a large commercial presence attracted drivers eager for the competition. The numerous drive-ins along the road, each with its dedicated local teenaged clientele, were also popular. In the age of the muscle car, Woodward had numerous car dealerships and automobile accessory shops.

== History ==
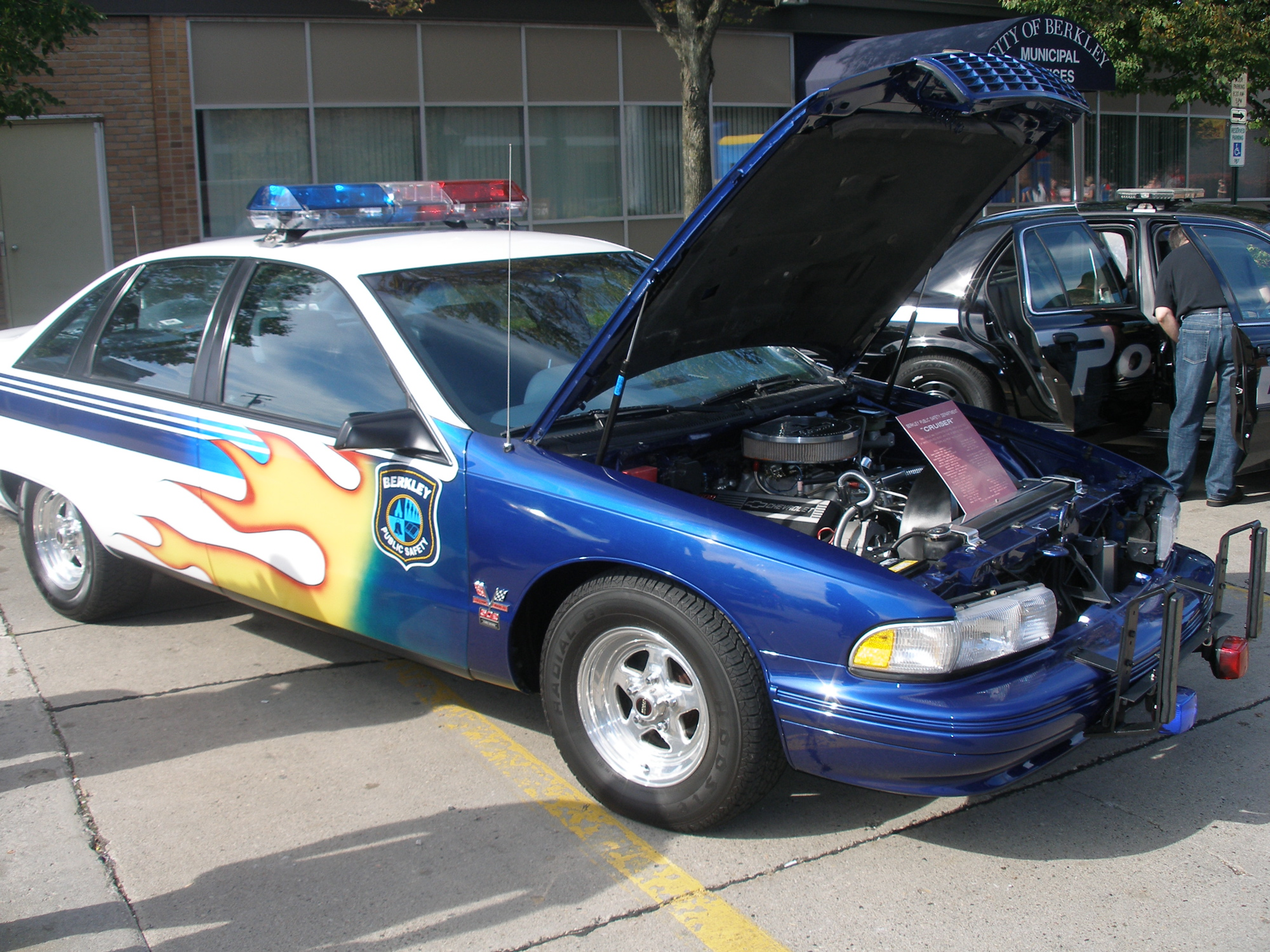
Berkley's Custom Police Cruiser, a 1991 Chevrolet Caprice complete with a 502-CID V8 and flames, donated by a group of residents for use in the Woodward Dream Cruise.

The Woodward Dream Cruise is the world's largest one-day automotive event, drawing about 1.5 million people and 40,000 cars, trucks, motorcycles, and supercars - both classic and modern - each year from around the globe. Spectators can see muscle cars, street rods, custom, collector and special interest vehicles dating across several decades. The majority of the cars on display are those that were available and popular during the 1950s, 60s and early 70s prior to the OPEC oil embargo. This had resulted in the federal government's Corporate Average Fuel Economy regulations of 1975 and the proliferation, temporarily, of more fuel-efficient and less powerful automobiles. However, the Woodward Dream Cruise also welcomes vehicles of all models whose owners have either scrupulously maintained or customized their car to create a unique vehicle or statement.

Prior to the organizing of the Dream Cruise residents of the west side of Detroit and the western Detroit suburban communities had been cruising Woodward Avenue since the 1940s. The ad hoc cruising caused traffic jams on many summer evenings, automobile accidents and included many cruisers drinking and driving. With the organizing of the Dream Cruise most of these bad influences simply disappeared.

Pamela S. McCullough, Mayor, and Nelson House, a plumber from Ferndale, came up with the idea for the cruise in 1994 to help raise money for a children's soccer field in his community. Organizers initially expected 30,000 or 40,000 people to come to the August 19, 1995, inaugural cruise on Woodward Avenue in Ferndale, Pleasant Ridge, Berkley, Huntington Woods, Royal Oak and Birmingham. About 250,000 showed up. It is now the largest single-day classic car event in the world, and brings in over $56 million annually to the Metro Detroit economy.

Although the cruise officially takes place on only one day, each year the celebration starts early in the summer as the classic vehicles begin to appear on local streets. The sponsoring communities of Birmingham, Ferndale, Pleasant Ridge, Royal Oak, Huntington Woods, Berkley, Bloomfield Township, Bloomfield Hills, and Pontiac collaborate on ancillary events.

Due to the COVID-19 pandemic, event organizers cancelled the 2020 Woodward Dream Cruise. Despite the official Woodward Dream Cruise being cancelled, an unofficial Dream Cruise was held by Woodward-area residents. The Oakland County Republican Party attempted to host a "MAGA Classic Car Cruise" in the absence of the Dream Cruise, causing controversy due to its political nature. The Dream Cruise resumed in August 2021.

== See also ==
- 28th Street Metro Cruise – a similar event that takes place on 28th Street in the cities of Grand Rapids, Kentwood and Wyoming, Michigan, held the weekend after the Dream Cruise.
- Back to the Bricks – a similar event that takes place on Saginaw Street in Flint, Michigan, generally held on the same weekend as the Dream Cruise.
- Cruisin' Downriver – a similar event that takes place on Fort Street in the Downriver suburbs of Detroit each June.
- Troy Traffic Jam – an annual auto show that takes place in Troy, Michigan in early August
- Cruising (driving)
