= Robert Fifer =

Robert Fifer (born February 2, 1956) is a retired American business consultant, author and speaker. He was the president of Fifer Associates and the author of Double Your Profits in Six Months or Less (HarperCollins, 1993).

== Biography ==
Fifer grew up in New York, graduating from Harvard College in 1977 with a magna cum laude degree in economics, and from Harvard Business School in 1979.

From 1979 to 1982, he was an officer at Strategic Planning Associates, a management consulting firm in Washington, D.C. In 1982, he became the fourth employee to join the management consulting company of Kaiser Associates. Three years later, at the age of 29, Fifer was promoted to chairman and CEO of the company.

In 2000, Fifer sold Kaiser Associates and established Fifer Associates.

Fifer's best-selling book, Double Your Profits in Six Months or Less (1993), became required reading for managers at Fortune 500 companies such as General Electric, Allied Signal, and Citicorp/Travelers. Jack Welch, the former CEO of General Electric, bought 125 copies for senior managers, who placed their own orders for another 2,700 copies.

Fifer lives with his wife in Great Falls, Virginia.

== Bibliography ==
- Beating the Competition: A practical guide to, benchmarking. Kaiser Associates. 1988.
- Double Your Profits: In Six Months Or Less: 78 Ways to Cut Costs, Increase Sales, and Dramatically Improve Your Bottom Line in Six Months or Less. HarperCollins. 1993. ISBN 0-88730-740-X.
- The Enlightened CEO: How to Succeed at the Toughest Job in Business. Franklin Hall Publishing. 2007. ISBN 978-1-934380-10-9. (with Gordon Quick)
