= Fifeshire (disambiguation) =

Fifeshire is an old name for Fife, an area of Scotland.

Fifeshire may also refer to:

- Fifeshire (UK Parliament constituency)
- Fifeshire (Parliament of Scotland constituency)
- Fifeshire, a New Zealand Company ship that brought immigrants to New Zealand in 1843
- Fifeshire FM, a radio station in Nelson, New Zealand
