= Fyffe (surname) =

Fyffe is a surname. Notable people with the surname include:

- Charles Alan Fyffe (1845–1892), English historian
- Jahmaal Fyffe (born 1990), English hip-hop rapper who has performed as Chip and as Chipmunk (rapper)
- Jim Fyffe (1945–2003), American sportscaster and radio talk show host
- Joseph P. Fyffe (1832–1896), American admiral
- Kelly Fyffe-Marshall, Canadian filmmaker
- Nick Fyffe (born 1972), English musician
- Will Fyffe (1885–1947), Scottish actor, singer, and songwriter
- Dorsey Fyffe (1974- ) AFSOC Flight Engineer, Operation Jaque 2008, program manager
