= Owain Phyfe =

American singer-songwriter (1949–2012)

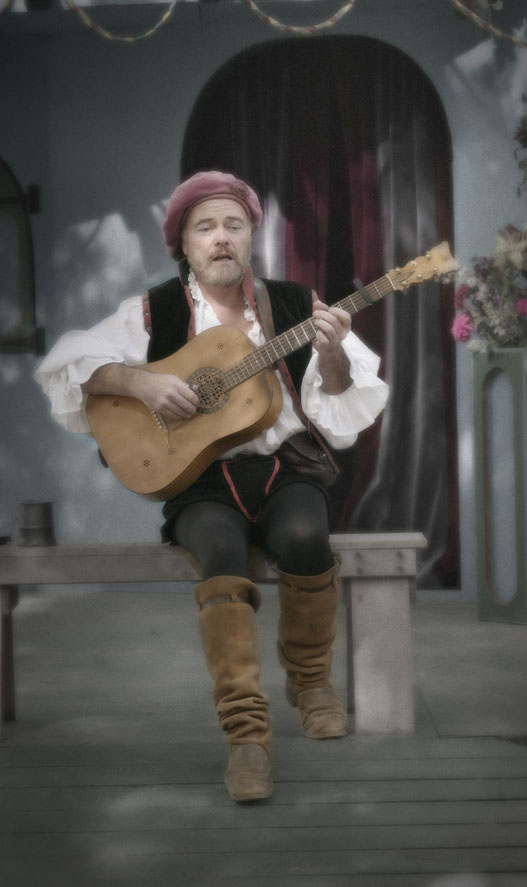
- Owain Phyfe plays for an audience at a Renaissance fair in 2003

Background information
- Born: Owen Fite; April 9, 1949
- Died: September 5, 2012 (aged 63)
- Genres: Folk; Medieval; Renaissance
- Occupation: Singer-songwriter
- Instrument: guitar/vocals
- Website: www.owainphyfe.com

Owain Phyfe (April 9, 1949 – September 5, 2012) was an American vocalist, instrumentalist, composer, and the founder of Nightwatch Recording, which concentrates on Renaissance and Medieval music. He lived in Berkley, Michigan, United States, often playing at O'Mara's Restaurant when he wasn't traveling the Renaissance circuit. He died from pancreatic cancer on September 5, 2012. The following day performers and fans held an all night wake in his honor.

== Early years ==
Phyfe grew up in a bilingual family with Welsh as a second language. Phyfe started and ran an automotive engineering company for nearly ten years. In 1992, however, nourished by his grandparents' appreciation for song, Phyfe's study of languages in college and his travels abroad to England, France, Mexico, and Spain as well as his experience later as a musician in New York City's Greenwich Village, he sold the company and turned to music as a full-time profession.

== Beginnings ==
In the mid-1980s, Phyfe and his wife Paula became festival performers at the Michigan Renaissance Festival. Spellbound by early music, Phyfe decided to develop a "singer of songs" persona. While researching late medieval and renaissance music, he found himself favoring faire life over the automotive engineering company he had started in 1983. "It became my dream to present the beauty of Renaissance music," Phyfe explained, "not as a documentary, but as a living expression."

== Musical career ==
He teamed up with the magical Renaissance Fair jam band CANTIGA in 1990 to form The New World Renaissance Band, specializing in the performance of ancient music in English, Spanish, Italian, Welsh, German, French, Provençal and Latin. He has also toured with Richie Blackmore and Candice Night. He played many traditional instruments including his favored instrument, the chitarra battente, as well as recorders, viola, cello, fiddle, and harp. He performed across the U.S., and his music has aired worldwide and on over 250 radio stations across North America. He performed and offered workshops at folk festivals, medieval recreationist, musical and Neo-Pagan events including the S.C.A.'s Pennsic War, The SCA's "Gulf Wars" event, where he performed solo and also with Wolgemut at the Green Dragon Tavern the Michigan Renaissance Festival, Sirius Rising, Pagan Spirit Gathering and the Starwood Festival, both as a soloist and with the New World Renaissance Band. He also contributed to the soundtrack of the Wim Wenders film Pina

== Critical reception ==
Live the Legend made the year-end bestseller list for classical releases at a number of retail chains across the midwest, including Streetside Records and Harmony House, and ranked #13 nationwide on Public Radio Music Source's classical best-seller list.

Reviewing a performance in St. Louis, the St. Louis Post-Dispatch said, "the fact that the group's sound was nearly as seamless live as it was coming out of the recording studio is impressive in the extreme, especially since the band's first two releases, "Live the Legend" and "Where Beauty Moves and Wit Delights," are outstanding musically and acoustically... The group's leader, Owain Phyfe, handles the foreign language lyrics of many of the songs as easily as he does the English (a skill many opera singers would do well to emulate)."

=== Awards ===
- 1997 Cessez Mortels de Soupirer (Sigh no More, Mortals) - Best Music Video: Ohio's National Telly Awards
- 1997 Cessez Mortels de Soupirer (Sigh no More, Mortals) - Best Music Video: International Communicator Awards
- 2003 Texas Renaissance Festival: The Phillip Hafer (King Henry) Memorial MVP Award

=== Performance reviews ===
- Revue Magazine June 1995
- Detroit Monthly March 1996
- WKBD-TV News Spotlight May 26, 1996

=== Album reviews ===
- Sunday Oakland Press March 3, 1996
- Shakespeare Oxford Newsletter Sept. 1997
- Magical Blend 1998 Issue #62
- Detroit Free Press Sept. 19th, 1999
- The Mists of Avalon - WDVR-FM
- Review of Owain Phyfe's Poets, Bards and Singers of Song by Willa, At The Fair Staff Writer (June 20, 2001)

== Partial discography ==
=== Owain Phyfe ===
- 1995 - Sweet Was the Song (with L'Ensemble Josquin) (Nightwatch Recording)
- 1999 - Poets, Bards, & Singers of Song (Nightwatch Recording)
- 2006 - Lágrimas de Sangría (Tears of Sangria) (Nightwatch Recording)

=== New World Renaissance Band ===
- 1992 - Live the Legend (Nightwatch Recording)
- 1995 - Where Beauty Moves and Wit Delights (Nightwatch Recording)
- 1996 - Odyssey (Nightwatch Recording)
- 2002 - Tales From the Vineyard (Nightwatch Recording)

=== Soundtrack ===
- 2011 - Pina, Director: Wim Wenders, song: La Prima Vez (Neue Road Movies, Eurowide Film Production) on YouTube
