= Back to the Bricks =

Car show held annually in Genesee County, Michigan

Back to the Bricks Back to the Bricks Car Cruise
- Status: Active Non-Profit Organization
- Genre: Automotive, Classic Cars & Trucks, Automotive Heritage
- Begins: 2004
- Frequency: Annually
- Location: Main Event: Downtown Flint
- Years active: 21
- Inaugurated: 2004 Founded 2005 First Downtown Flint Car Show
- Founder: Al Hatch, Bob Sovis, Dave Wood, Don Bair, Ed McDonough, John Olay, & Joseph Taubitz
- Next event: Chrome & Ice, February
- Participants: 3,500 Cars on Main Event Saturday
- Attendance: 500,000+
- Area: USA
- Major events: Car Shows, Car Cruises, Concerts, Dust 'em Off, Chrome & Ice, Promo Tour, Main Event, Tune Up Parties
- Patron: General Motors' Buick brand
- Filing status: 501(c)(3)
- People: Amber Lynn Taylor (President)
- Member: Back to the Bricks, Inc.
- Website: backtothebricks.org

Back to the Bricks is a car show held annually in Genesee County, Michigan.

The five-day event is structured with the first day having a Kick off party and "Brick Flick" automotive movie seen at the US 23 Drive-in Theatre, at least two days of Rolling Cruise, a Friday night car show & Cruise N Concert and wrapping it up on Saturday with a HUGE car show in downtown Flint. Additional, there is an Automotive Pioneers Statue plaza located in Downtown Flint.

Back to the Bricks has expanded beyond the events in downtown Flint and Saginaw Street to add other supplementary events: two Satellite cruises, a Promo Tour and the county Tune Ups. Back to the Bricks is a part of Autopalooza August and one of the Flint Parade of Festivals. The event has also inspired the names for other events in the City of Flint like Fish On The Bricks (since 2004), Bikes on the Bricks (since 2007), and Tractors on the Bricks (2017).

== History ==
Dates	cars	people
2009	25,000	250,000
August 17–21, 2010		

In 2004 a group of car enthusiasts came together to form a car group that would soon bring one of America's Classic Car Events to Flint Michigan. in 2005 the first Back to the Bricks and Under the Arches celebration was held under Flint's newly renovated brick street and reinstalled arches. The celebration was held on the same day as another local car cruise, the A&W monthly cruise in Flushing, Michigan, and the Woodward Dream Cruise in Oakland County, Michigan. The goal of this scheduling was to hopefully have spectators from the local area to “cruise" once again from the Flushing hotspot to the Flint event. Another goal was for spectators attending the Woodward Avenue Dream car cruise to stop by the Back to the Bricks and Under the Arches car cruise on the way to and or from the Woodward Avenue Dream Cruise. (Note: Miller, James M. (August 28, 2005). "Downtown cruise worth a cartwheel".)

During the first year the Back to the Bricks and Under the Arches car cruise had about less than 1,000 spectators in attendance and less than that number of cars. The events within the celebration consisted of only official the car cruise. (Note: Swiatecki, Chad. (August 21, 2005). "Car cruise offers room to maneuver". The Flint Journal, Flint.) The following year the celebration added another day and packed another event into its schedule. These new events this year were a cruise in from various areas in the county and the official cruise. (Note: Miller, James M. "’Woodward Day’ cruise expanding", 3 August 2006.) With the spike in the number of events came the spike in the number or attendants. It is estimated that a total of 1000 cars and spectators attended the second year of the event. (Note: Miller, James M. "Cars keep making way to Flint". 27 August 2006.)

By 2007 the Back to the Bricks had celebrated its third year. With the new addition of another day and one more day the celebration brought in a larger crowd. This Back to the Bricks and Under the Arches celebration brought in about 1000 cars and 1500 more spectators that the previous year. (Note: Miller, James M. "Back to the Bricks revving up ideas for more downtown events". 22 August 2007.) The events for this go around consisted of the newly added rolling cruise, the cruise in, and the official cruise. (Note: Miller, James M. "Back to the Bricks real deal for cruisers, viewers". 7 August 2007.) With the rolling cruise came support from local businesses. Many of these served as stops for the rolling cruise and also offered deals for cruisers. (Note: Miller, James M. "Bricks car cruise keeps on growing". 12 August 2007.) Yet again the cruise expanded in the following year. After the cruise became a four-day celebration. The event added this year was an additional rolling cruise. (Note: Miller, James M. "Bricks cruise will grow yet again". 27 September 2007.) An estimated 125,000 spectators and 3,000 cars were figured to be in attendance. (Note: Abercrombie, Shena. "Flint’s bricks loaded with car, people".) (Note: DeFever, Dana. "Crowds for Back to the Bricks surge to 125,000". August 19, 2008.)

In November 2007, the Rolling cruise received national television coverage by the Speed Channel. On February 24, 2008, and February 26, 2008, the channel released a collection of stories and footage from the 2007 Back to the Bricks and Under the Arches Celebration. This served as the introduction of My Classic Car’s new season. (Note: Burden, Melissa. "Back to the Bricks to shine in Speed Channel’s spotlight". February 2008.) Since this other media coverage of the event has been made including a recent article in Old Cars Weekly about the car clubs featured in the cruise.

With the 2008 event, the rolling cruise portion was extended to two days with 32 official stops and added a Women's Expo. The cruise extend from Mega Coney Island, 401 King Avenue, downtown Flint to Food Castle supermarket, 16853 Dixie Highway, Groveland Township in northern Oakland County.

In 2009, it was the Back to the Bricks and Under the Arches scar cruise’s fifth anniversary. As a milestone in the event's history it was also added to Autopalooza August. This included joining with the Woodward Avenue Dream Cruise to which it was originally made to complement. The join is hoped to give more publicity to the celebration. In addition to this the celebration again expanded with a day and the events of a drive-in screening of the movie Cars and the Buckham Alley Bash. This is significantly different from previous years in the way that these events were hosted mostly by area restaurants and the local drive-in. With an attendance of more than 125,000 spectators and a car count of 3,000, the Back to the Bricks and Under the Arches more than quintupled its attendance and expectations which it first had.

In June 2010, a promotional tour was sent out to the Lincoln Highway. In 2011, the organization held its second promotional tour, Michigan Mitten Promotional Tour, in June and its first set of “tuneup” events. In July 2011, the Back to the Bricks, Inc. started plans to create a dozen statues of historic auto and labor figures and place them in Flint's downtown and college campus areas starting with Louis Chevrolet. Don Garlits, a "drag racing icon", made appearances at all the major events of the 2011 cruise.

Added to the 2012 event was Pinewood Derby race sponsored by the Boy Scouts, GM and Thomas Appliance. At the opening of the 2013 event and unveiling of the Durant statue, General Motors North America President Mark Reuss confirmed GM's purchase of the Durant-Dort Carriage Factory One and office building on Water Street with plans to restore them with local universities help.

Added to the event in 2013 was the first "Artomotive" competition, where artist work with the base item of a car hood. The contest was created by the Greater Flint Arts Council and the Flint & Genesee Convention and Visitors Bureau to be a fundraiser for the statues fund.

At the ended of the 2013 main event, Back to the Bricks founder and chair Hatch transferred chairmanship of the main event to Roberta Vasilow so as to spend more time on the statue project and chair next year's promotional tour. Vasilow served previously as chair, website and the gate committee (2009) then lead the Tune Up Party Week in 2011 followed by chairing the promotional tour in 2013. Also, the City of Flint indicated that it would not cover police patrols for which they received a few years of a C.S. Mott Foundation Grant to cover. Thus the organization was considering change the event format to another night of cruising on Friday night.

On December 8, 2013, General Motors announced five years of financial support for Back to the Bricks including the promotion tours and the Tune-Up Week. MSN Autos has declared Back to the Bricks a "Best auto events of 2014". On January 16, 2014, the Back to the Bricks announced new franchised satellite cruises in Cadillac and Mount Pleasant in conjunction with their Visitors Bureaus after having been stops on the Promo Tours for the last two years and not on the 2014 tours. In May 2014, the organization and Music in the Parks announced that the Friday night concert would be moved to the General Motors Weld Tool Center located in both the city and township of Grand Blanc for safety concerns and the end of the Friday night show. While the Flint Symphony Orchestra indicated that they would keep their performance downtown, but in front of Flint City Hall, with Flash Cadillac.

With the 2015 event, the Hot Ride High program debuted initiated by Dale Frey. At their December 3, 2015, press conference, the organization announced their 2016 promo tour and a new winter auto show, Chrome and Ice, for 2016.

In 2019, Back to the Bricks officially brings on their first PAID Employee, the new Executive Director, Amber Lynn Taylor. In 2025 Taylor was announced "President" of Back to the Bricks.

== Series events ==
=== Chrome and Ice ===
Chrome and Ice will be the Back to the Bricks winter indoor car show held in mid-February at the Dort Financial Center and like the main event is sponsored by General Motors and Dort Financial Credit Union.

The idea for the winter show stemmed the Back to the Bricks yearly promotional booth at the Autorama car show at Cobo Hall in Detroit. BtB board wanted Flint to have a similar experience. At their December 3, 2015 press conference, the organization announced their first Chrome and Ice winter auto show for February 12–13, 2016. The inaugural event is planned to have a summertime feel with sand and palm trees brought in to complement it entertainment, a California beach boy band.

For the second Chrome and Ice, the event took over both arenas at the Dort event center. Also, the time opened expanded with a preview party on Thursday night

=== Promo Tours ===
Promo Tour
- Status: active
- Genre: auto
- Begins: June 8, 2018
- Ends: June 13, 2018
- Frequency: Annually
- Venue: Traveling
- Inaugurated: June 20, 2010
- Founder: Al Hatch
- Previous event: Chrome and Ice
- Next event: Cadillac Back to the Bricks
- Participants: 182
- Major events: cruise & car show

The Promo Tours, or promotional tours, are when classic auto are driven around through a series of overnight stop with mini car shows.

- Lincoln Highway Road Trip (June 20-,2010) 25 cars left Flint on June 20, 2010 to head to Lincoln Highway joining up with the highway at Lima, Ohio with a couple of cars having car issues on the first day.
- Michigan Mitten Promotional Tour (June 17–24, 2011) was an eight-day trip for 125 persons around the perimeter of the Lower Peninsula with stops in Port Huron, Bay City, Alpena, Mackinaw City, Traverse City, Ludington, Holland and Brooklyn.
- Heart of Michigan (June 15–22, 2012) had about 200 cars with stops in Mt. Pleasant, Traverse City, Cadillac, Grand Rapids, Sturgis.
- Lakeshore to Lakeshore (June 7–12, 2013) with communities lobbying to be on the tour, Cadillac, Oscoda, Mt. Pleasant and Hart's Asparagus Festival Parade, Rockford and West Branch were selected as stops. Also, several tours were arranged of: Cooper Standard Automotive, Langley Powder Coating, Yankee Air Museum, Kalitta Air, Melvin Motorcycle Museum and Phoenix Composite Solutions.
- Michiana (June 20–24, 2014)
- West Side (June 12–16, 2015) Battle Creek, Whitehall, Manistee, Boyne City, and West Branch
- Friendship (June 10–15, 2016) Flint, Ypsilanti, Port Huron, East Tawas, Grayling, West Branch and Birch Run
- Heritage (June 10–15, 2017) Clare, Big Rapids, Muskegon, Coldwater, Adrian and Fenton
- Mighty Mac and Back (June 8–13, 2018) first tour to cross the Mackinaw Bridge with stops in Mt. Pleasant, Gaylord, Petoskey, St. Ignace and East Tawas

=== Tune Ups ===
In 2010, a test "Tune Up" was run in Davison. In 2011, the Back to the Brick organization started its more local "tune up" series of events that occur in Genesee County lead up to the main event. Five communities, Clio, Flint Township, Linden/Fenton, Davison and Richfield Township had the first set up of Tune Ups each on a separate day from August 9–13, 2011.

== Automotive Pioneers Statue Fund ==
Statue	Year placed	Location
Louis Chevrolet	2012	Bricks Statue Plaza
David Buick	November 27, 2012	Bricks Statue Plaza
William C. Durant	2013	Bricks Statue Plaza
Walter P. Chrysler	September 9, 2013	Bishop Airport
Charles Nash		Bishop Airport
Otto P. Graff (pioneering car dealer)	2014	Corner of S. Saginaw and E. Court St. (at the former site of the first Graff car dealership)
Albert Champion		
C.S. Mott		
Walter P. Reuther		
Victor G. Reuther		

The Automotive Pioneers Statue Fund was established in July 2011 to create a dozen statues of historic auto and labor figures and place them in Flint's downtown and college campus areas starting with Louis Chevrolet. The fund's goal is $500,000 and 15 statues later eight at the cost of $40,000 each with granite base and the installation comes in at $20,000 per statue.

At the announcement of the fund on July 21, 2011, two statues were already ordered, Louis Chevrolet and David Buick. Diplomat Pharmacy and organization organized the Million Dollar Motorway fundraising event to kick off fundraising for the Automotive Pioneer Fund during the 2011 Back to the Bricks on August 17. The event was held at Diplomat headquarters with collector vehicles worth over $2 million at $30 a person. Amongst the cars were a 1933 Auburn Model 8, a rare Watson-Hurst Camaro and Eva Peron owned Packard.

On Saginaw Street between Kearsley and First Streets, a memorial mini-park, called Bricks Statue Plaza, for the first few statues was construction out of the part of a parking lot in July 2012 with mostly donated labor and materials. The first statue to place in the mini-park was Louis Chevrolet in August. On December 1, the David Buick statue was unveiled at the statue plaza.

On August 13, 2012, Back to the Bricks held a fundraiser for the Statue Fund called American Muscle Motorway at which the money was raised by plaza brick sales, the $15 event fee and donations. Which the event got from Attentive Industries $40,000, enough for the event goal, the cost of another statue.

The founder of GM, William Durant ended up being the third statue produced and was placed at the Saginaw statue park at the opening of the 2013 Back to the Bricks with several speakers. The next two statues of Chrysler and Nash are to be placed at the Bishop Airport.

== Hot Ride High ==
Hot Ride High program allowed youth and young adult to learn about jobs in car mechanics or body repair and to the collecting car hobby. Organizers plan to have the program to be a year-round program through the various local colleges, Baker College, Mott Community College, Kettering University and University of Michigan–Flint.

Hot Ride High was conceived of by Dale Frey. Frey recruited in 2010 Bob Ayre, a welding instructor at Baker College, who became one of the high's organizers. The program was first held in 2015 for which a couple of thousand interested youth passed through the program's display. In 2016, the display was more hands on and included representatives from area colleges.

Preceded by Clinton Township Gratiot Cruise	Autopalooza	Succeeded by Pure Michigan 400 NASCAR Weekend

Preceded by Flint Jazz Festival	Flint Parade of Festivals	Succeeded by Free City Festival
