= Irwin Fife =

Irwin L. Fife
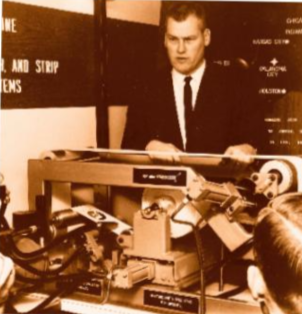
- Born: January 13, 1894; Fayetteville, Georgia
- Died: February 12, 1971 (aged 77); Oklahoma City, Oklahoma
- Scientific career
- Institutions: Fife Manufacturing

Irwin L. Fife (1894–1971) was an American inventor credited with the invention of modern web-guiding systems from his garage in Oklahoma City, Oklahoma. In 1939, Fife founded Fife Manufacturing. He received numerous patents for his advances in web guiding and manufacturing. In 1975, Fife Manufacturing became a publicly traded company.

== Inventing web guide systems ==
In 1939, a local friend in the newspaper business came to Irwin for help with a high-speed newspaper press. Over the next year, Mr. Fife invented a web guide from his garage in Oklahoma City, Oklahoma.

== Fife Manufacturing ==
Founded in 1939 in Oklahoma City, Oklahoma, Fife Manufacturing developed tools for web handling and web inspection. In 1975, Fife Manufacturing Corp. filed for an initial public offering on the stock market.

== U.S. Patents ==
# U.S. patent 2,562,026 – Automatic Web Guiding Apparatus (1946) US
# U.S. patent 2,675,988 – Feeler Actuated Valve (1954) US
# U.S. patent 2,904,333 – Turn Guiding Apparatus for Webs (1957) US
# U.S. patent 3,010,438 – Pneumatic Control Valve for Hydraulic System (1961) US

== Personal achievements ==
Fife is the founding member of the Oklahoma State University Web Handling Research Center (WHRC) and has been its primary sponsor since it was formed in 1986.
