= Ian Fyfe (British journalist) =

British journalist who died at D-Day

- Fyfe in US Army uniform, c. 1944
- Born: Ian Herbert Fyfe; 1918 or 1919
- Died: 6 June 1944 (aged 24–26)
- Cause of death: Glider crash-landing during D-Day
- Occupation: Journalist
- Employer: Daily Mirror

Ian Herbert Fyfe (1918 or 1919 – 6 June 1944) was a British journalist for the Daily Mirror. He joined the newspaper in 1938 and during the Second World War volunteered for assignment to the airborne landings during the D-Day portion of Operation Overlord. Fyfe's Horsa glider crash-landed in Normandy and he died after being pinned by a Jeep the glider was carrying. Fyfe was the only British journalist to die on D-Day.

== Earlier career ==
Fyfe was Scottish and was born in 1918 or 1919. He joined the staff of the Daily Mirror in 1938 and was a trainee at the same time as Donald Zec who recalled him as "a very good reporter, a very bright chap ... I admired him – he had a lot of guts". In 1943, Fyfe married a woman called Betty and the couple lived in Croydon.

In 1943, Fyfe had reported on American servicemen spending Christmas in London. In January 1944, his report on the civilian victims of a German incendiary bombing in London made the front page of the Daily Mirror.

== D-Day ==
Ahead of the Normandy landings, the Daily Mirror asked for volunteers to accompany the invading troops as war correspondents. Fyfe and a colleague, Harry Procter, both volunteered. Fyfe was selected because, Procter was told, Fyfe had no children while Procter had four.

Fyfe underwent intensive training with the British Army to prepare him for his role. For a week before D-Day (6 June 1944), he lived on camp with the men of the 9th (Eastern and Home Counties) Parachute Battalion. He was to accompany the men in a Horsa glider due to land in Normandy during the early stages of the invasion. On the night of 5 June, he filed what would be his final report, an account of a service given by the unit's chaplain (who accompanied them in the operation), before the men departed for France. He said that the unit's "morale has never been higher".

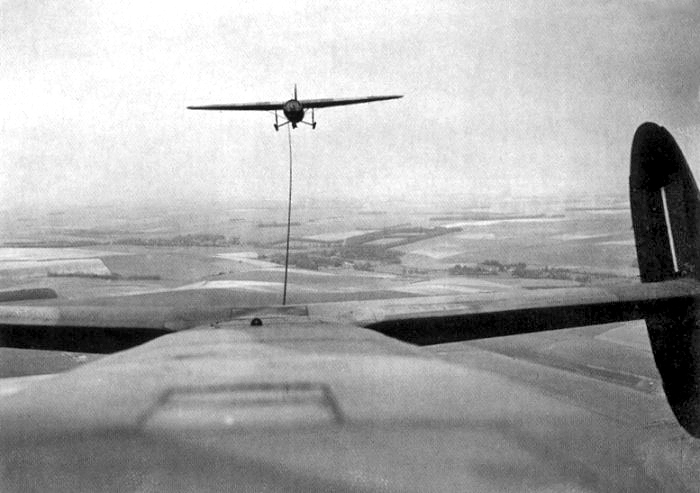
A Horsa glider being towed by an Albemarle aircraft

Fyfe was assigned to glider Chalk 66, which, as part of Operation Tonga, was to carry soldiers to attack the Merville Gun Battery that threatened Allied vessels off the Sword Beach landing zone. Fyfe boarded Chalk 66 at RAF Harwell in Oxfordshire at 11 pm on 5 June. Also on board were two glider pilots, a lieutenant, an enlisted paratrooper, and three sappers of the Royal Engineers, and a Jeep. The rope from the Armstrong Whitworth Albemarle towing aircraft broke as the glider travelled through low clouds. The glider crash-landed in a swamp near the Merville gun battery and struck either a tree or a German anti-glider pole. Fyfe's body was never recovered and he was listed as missing in action, presumed dead. He was the only British journalist to die on D-Day.

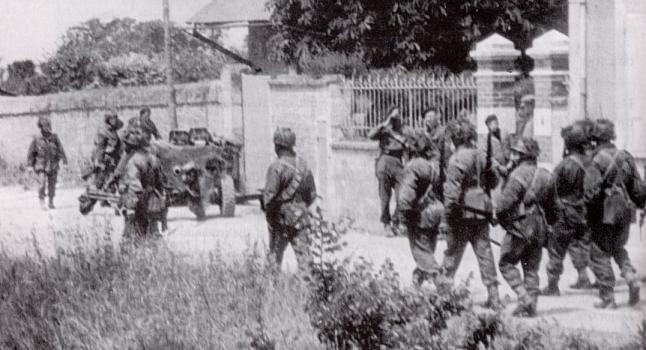
Men of 9th Parachute Battalion in Normandy, June 1944

The enlisted paratrooper, Geoff Fuller, survived the impact. He recounted the crash details to an officer investigating the status of Sergant Ockwell, one of the pilots, who was also listed as missing in action. Fuller believed he had been sitting next to Fyfe in the glider. He recalled waking from a period of unconsciousness. He saw Fyfe had been pinned by the Jeep and saw him die within about 10 minutes. Fuller, who had been injured in the crash, managed to crawl to a nearby ditch. He witnessed German troops arrive soon after dawn to machine gun the glider and a later party came to recover the bodies. The attack on Merville Gun Battery went ahead on 6 June. Only 150 of the assigned 600 men arrived to take part in the attack and around half of those who did were killed. The gun battery was taken but many of its crew survived and were back in action by the following day after the paratroopers withdrew. A second attack on 7 June failed to disable it and it remained in operation until August 1944.

== Legacy ==
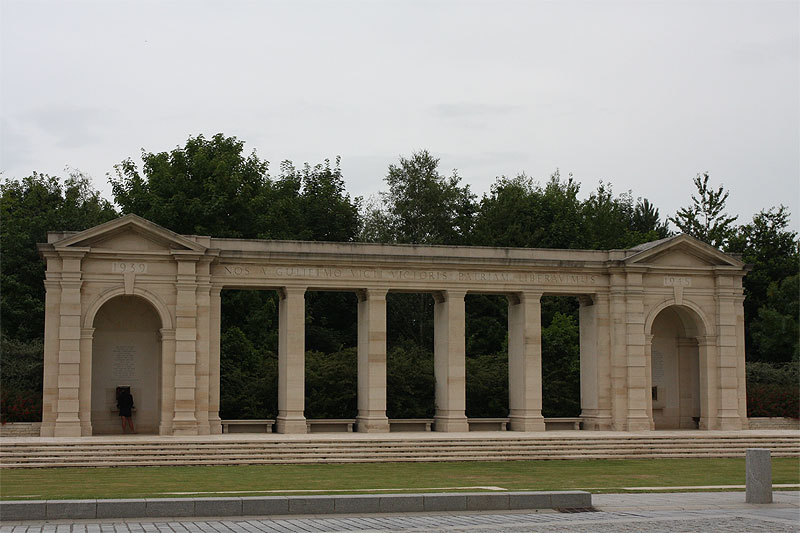
The Bayeux Memorial

After Fyfe's death, his wife Betty remarried; she died in the 1990s. Fyfe's brother, Crystal Palace footballer Alan Fyfe, named his son, born in 1954, after his dead brother.

Fyfe's body is possibly one of the unknown burials in the Commonwealth War Graves Commission's (CWGC) Ste. Marie Cemetery at Le Havre. He is the only journalist to be named on the Bayeux Memorial at the CWGC's Bayeux War Cemetery. In addition, Fyfe is the first name to appear on the journalists' memorial, inaugurated opposite Bayeux Cemetery in 2006 and commemorating more than 2,000 journalists killed in war since 1944.
