= Allan Fife =

Australian businessman

Allan Anthony Fife
- Born: October 1954 (age 71); NSW, Australia
- Education: Macquarie University, Western Sydney University
- Occupation: Businessman
- Title: Chief Investment Officer, Fife Capital

Allan Anthony Fife OAM (born October 1954) is an Australian business man noted for his property investment acumen. In 2017 Fife received the Medal of the Order of Australia for service to aged welfare, to business, and to the property sector.
