= Wyoming, Michigan =

City in Michigan, United States

- City
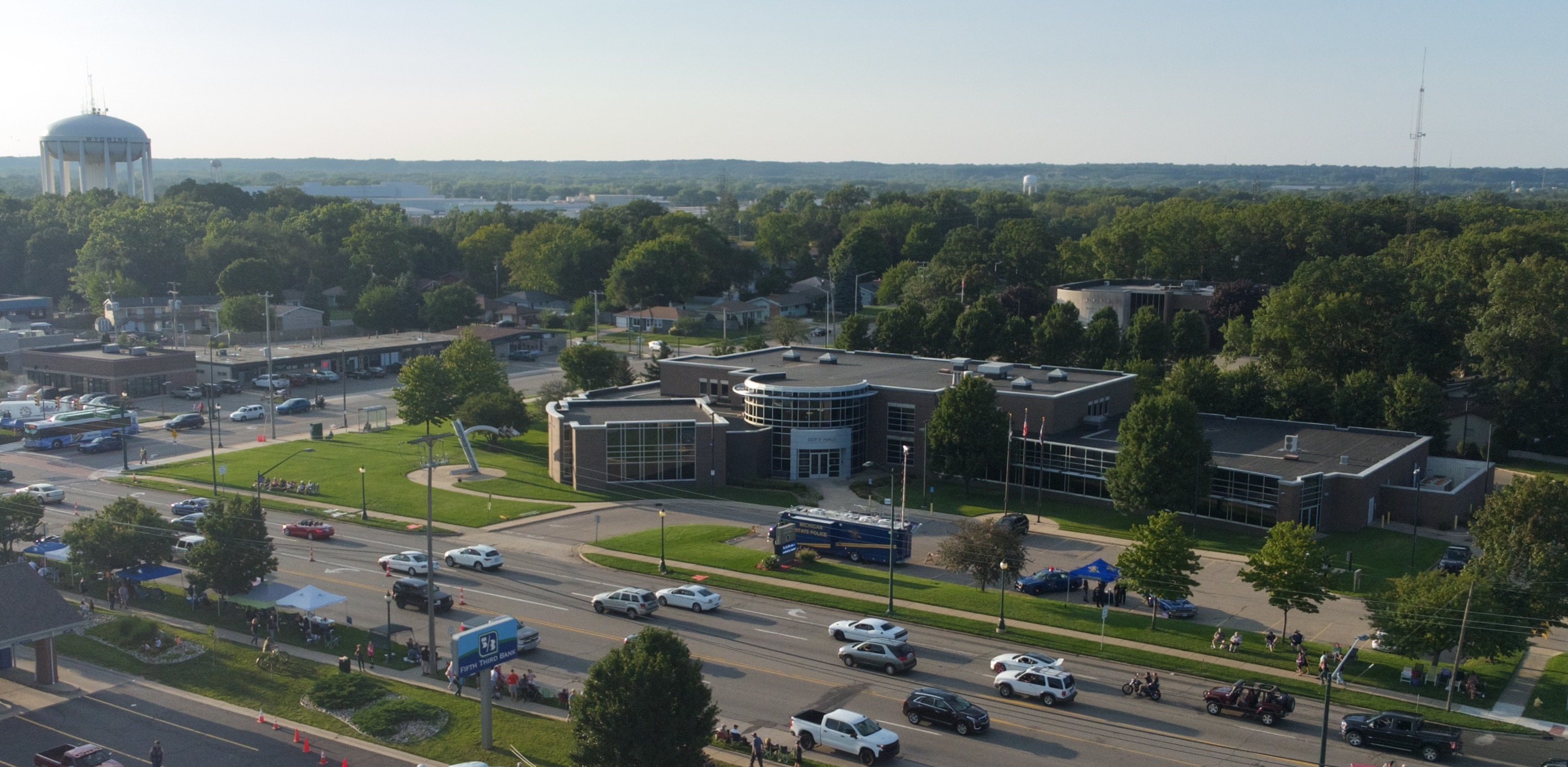
- Center of Wyoming near the city hall, district court and 28th Street

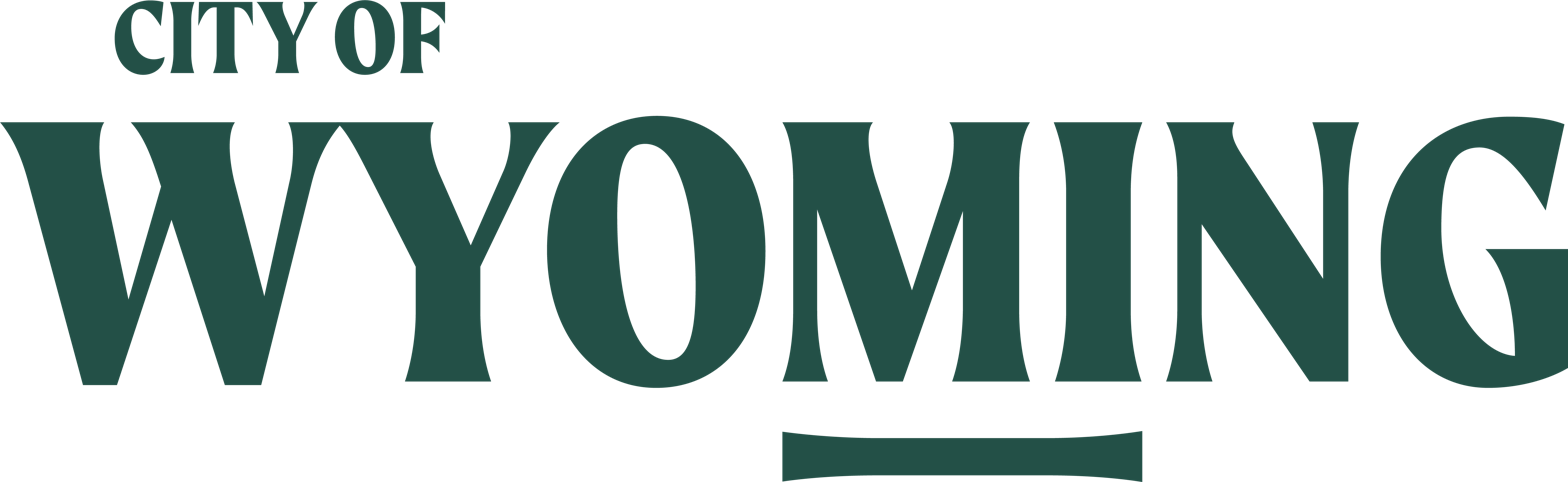
- Flag Seal
- Motto: City of Vision and Progress
- Interactive map of Wyoming, Michigan
- Location within Michigan Location within the United States
- Coordinates: 42°52′35″N 85°45′27″W
- Country: United States
- State: Michigan
- County: Kent
- Organized: 1848 (Wyoming Township)
- Incorporated: 1959

Government
  - Type: Mayor–Council
  - Mayor: Kent Vanderwood
  - Manager: John Shay
  - Clerk: Kelli VandenBerg

Area
  - Total: 24.95 sq mi (64.62 km^{2})
  - Land: 24.74 sq mi (64.08 km^{2})
  - Water: 0.21 sq mi (0.54 km^{2})
- Elevation: 666 ft (203 m)

Population (2020)
  - Total: 76,501
  - Density: 3,092.0/sq mi (1,193.84/km^{2})
- Time zone: UTC-5 (EST)
  - Summer (DST): UTC-4 (EDT)
- ZIP code(s): 49418 (Grandville); 49503 (Grand Rapids); 49508 (Kentwood); 49509, 49519; 49548 (Grand Rapids)
- Area code: 616
- FIPS code: 26-88940
- GNIS feature ID: 1627295
- Website: Official website

Wyoming is a city in Kent County in the U.S. state of Michigan. The population was 76,501 at the 2020 census. Part of the Grand Rapids metropolitan area, Wyoming is bordered by Grand Rapids to the northeast and, after Grand Rapids, it is the second most-populous city in West Michigan.

European-Americans settled the area in 1832 along Buck Creek, and it was organized as Wyoming Township in 1848 after separating from Byron Township. Through the 19th and early 20th centuries, Wyoming remained a rural area providing goods to Grand Rapids, until the Grand Rapids, Holland and Chicago Railway spurred suburbanization. After Grandville was incorporated in 1933 and the General Motors Stamping Division Plant opened, Wyoming faced annexation disputes with Grand Rapids and Grandville until incorporating as a city in 1959.

As a city, Wyoming became a regional retail and entertainment hub on the 28th Street corridor with the opening of Rogers Plaza and Studio 28. Development declined in the 1980s. Growth then shifted to Wyoming's southwest near RiverTown Crossings and later around Metro Health Hospital after 2007, though the GM plant closed in 2009. Since the mid-2010s, the city has focused on redeveloping 28th Street through the City Center project and repurposing the 74-acre former GM property, now called Site 36.

== History ==
=== Native American settlements ===
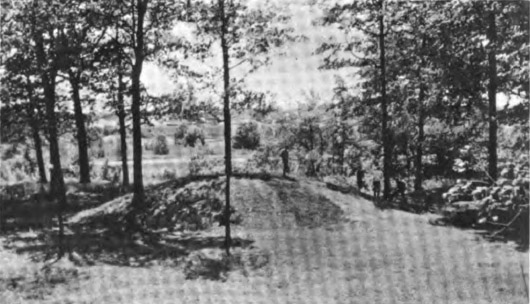
Mound H of the Norton Mound group

Native Americans of the Hopewellian culture inhabited the region from ca. 400 B.C. to A.D. 400. Classified as the Goodall focus, a Hopewell sub-grouping, they created a series of structures known as Norton Mound group with the mounds probably being constructed in the first century AD. Odawa tribes were established in the area near present-day Wyoming, with the village of the ogema Black Skin, natively known as Muck-i-ta-oska or Mukatasha, ranging from the southwest present-day Grand Rapids to the Grand River across from the Norton Mound group, with the mouth of the Black Skin Creek leading into the Grand River across from the mounds. Where what is now Grandville, Michigan, a prairie existed west of Wyoming where up to ten native families under the ogema As-to-quet, who were friendly with early settlers in the area, held planting grounds.

=== Little Prairie settlement ===
In the late 1700s, French fur traders traversed the Grand River Valley. Lucius Lyon, a Yankee Protestant, was contracted by the federal government to survey the Grand River Valley in the fall of 1830 and in the first quarter of 1831, the federal survey of the Northwest Territory reached the Grand River, setting the boundaries for Kent County, named after prominent New York jurist James Kent. Lyon would also survey "Township Nº VI West, Range Nº XII North", which would become Wyoming. The area that is now the city of Wyoming was the second location settled by European-Americans in Kent County. Robert Howlett, Luther Lincoln, Amos Gordon and Stephen Tucker were some of the first settlers in the fall of 1832. Gordon left Wayne County, Michigan to arrive at the mission in Grand Rapids to build the first mill at Indian Mill Creek, later leading a scouting group of Howlett, Lincoln and Tucker in birch canoes down the Grand River in the summer of 1832. The group found Buck Creek emptying into the Grand, determining the creek was strong enough for a mill, with many of Wyoming's first settlers establishing themselves near the creek.

Lincoln built the first log shanty in the area in the fall of 1832 and began to prepare his plot with livestock and crops before the winter. Lincoln and Tucker would stay at the mission through the winter; Tucker and Native Americans later constructed the first established house for his family in March 1833. Lincoln's cabin, however, was built in close proximity to the Norton Mounds and was likely burned down by Odawa natives according to settler Roswell Britton. The first settlers had a successful harvest, constructing gristmills and sawmills on Buck Creek in a year in 1833 and by April 1834, a community called "Little Prairie" had been established. On May 24, 1834, the first post office was established at Little Prairie. In 1835, competing lumber mills on Buck Creek that supplied wood to Chicago – one owned by Albert and John Bull and the other by Nathanial Brown – starved the water flow to Gordon's mill, resulting with Gordon building a new mill on what is now the southwest corner of 44th Street and Burlingame Avenue. Through the 1800s, Wyoming would primarily remain an agricultural location and its development occurred near transportation routes in the region.

=== Byron Township (1836–1848) ===
The boundaries of Township 5 North, Range 12 West and Township 6 North, Range 12 West, surveyed by Lyon, were consolidated and designated to be organized as Byron Township in 1835 by the Michigan Territorial Legislature. In late 1835, the first wedding occurred between Sylvester Hills and Harriet Burton. The town was first organized as Byron Township on May 2, 1836, was called "Oakesville" as it was headquartered at the home of Charles H. Oakes, though when Oakes moved to the Upper Peninsula of Michigan, the name was changed to Grandville. It was this year that one of Wyoming's most notable pioneers, Justus Charles Rogers, established his homestead on what is now the southwest corner of 28th Street and Clyde Park Avenue. A framed house was constructed by Rogers in the spring of 1836 and was expected to accept his wife upon their return, though the home was discovered destroyed by a tornado in September 1836 when they returned.

The following year in 1837, the launch of the pole boat propelled by a quant, the Cinderella, was celebrated as a major development for the town. The first floor of what would become Rogers Mansion was then constructed in 1837, with the second floor being finished in 1839. For three weeks, settlers had to live without flour and late in the year, the first metal casting occurred at the Jame McCray foundry. In 1839, the township's final land patents south of the Grand River were issued for plots near the salt springs adjacent to the Norton Mounds and Section 16. Plaster Creek first powered plaster operations in the township in 1841 on land leased by Daniel Ball from De Garmo Jones. In May 1843, Gordon died in Plainfield Township, Michigan.

=== Wyoming Township (1848–1959) ===
On April 3, 1848, the 72 square miles (190 km^{2}) township of Byron divided in half, with the name of Wyoming being used for the northern 36 square miles (93 km^{2}) portion where the majority of the population was settled, with many settling near Buck Creek. At the time of division, about 500 people lived in Wyoming while fewer than 200 lived in Byron. The name came from the Wyoming County, New York, from which the majority of the residents came during the first 16 years. During the Great Famine in Ireland, Irish immigrants began to appear in Wyoming in 1849, with the Whalen family being among the first Irish families in the township. Michael Avenue is named after Michael Whalen. Dutch immigrants arrived in greater numbers and created agricultural cooperatives on smaller parcels of land, creating closed groups among themselves. In 1850, the population of Wyoming Township was counted at 543 people. At the time, Dutch and Irish immigrants were scapegoated for the prevalence of "Michigan ague", or malaria, which had begun affecting the area.

==== Fisher's Station ====
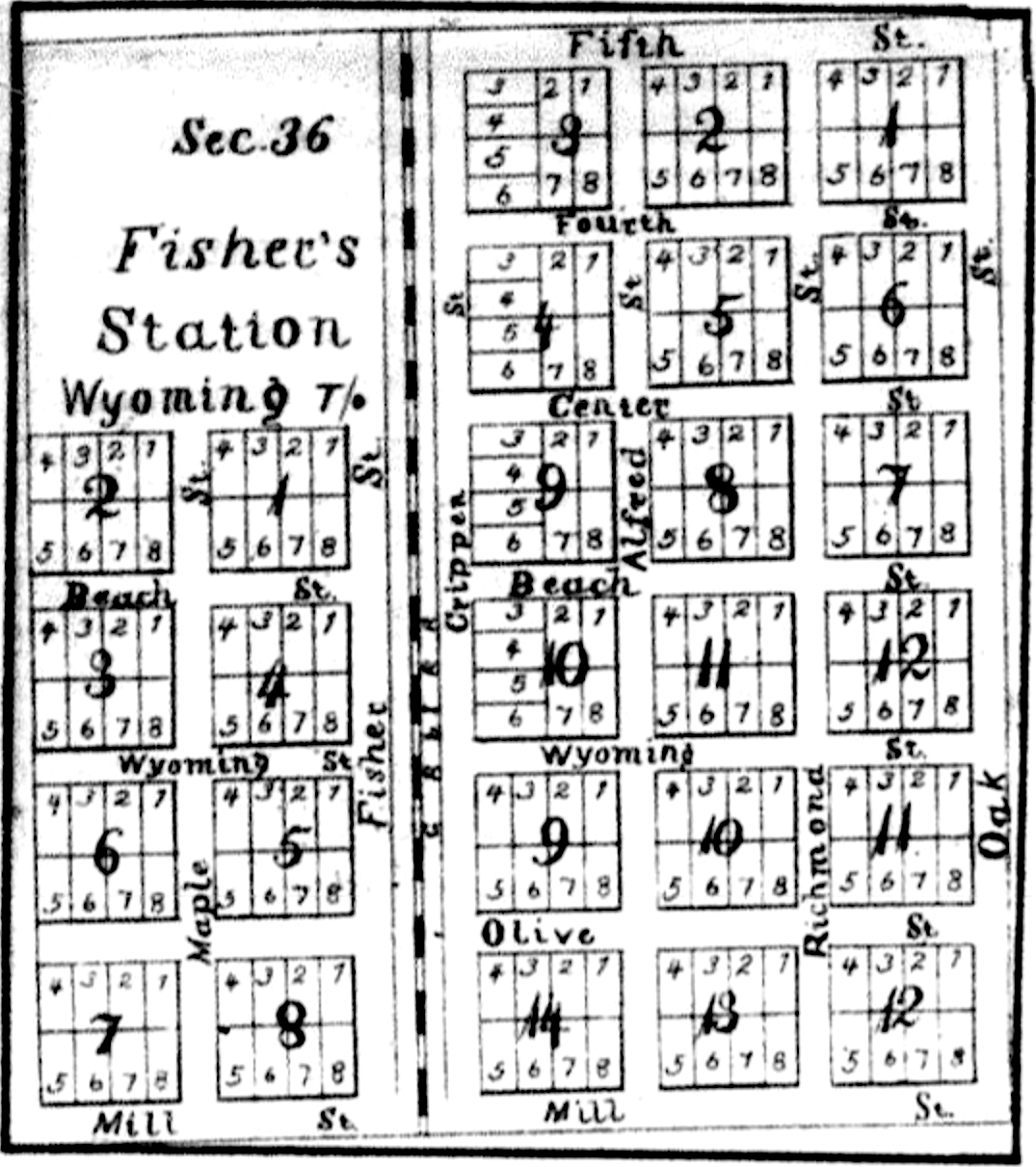
Fisher's Station, 1876

David Fisher arrived in Wyoming in 1857 and acquired land from Gordon's estate, replacing Gordon's old Buck Creek mill, which had burned down, and built a replacement. Fisher would then construct cabins along the west side of Burlingame Avenue which housed Fisher and the millers he employed. Operations for Fisher would expand further south on Buck Creek where he would extract lime and peat, later building a second mill on a plot of land he purchased from William Ferry in the southeast portion of the township. In 1869, a station on the Grand Rapids and Indiana Railroad was constructed, and in 1870, Fisher had a town platted called "Fisher's Station," which would develop around the railroad station. A post office was constructed in 1871 and the area was platted in December 1873. The population of Wyoming Township grew to 2,008 in 1874 while the population of Fisher's Station was 65 in 1888. Fisher, along with his brother and business partner, James, would retire in Grand Rapids and lived as wealthy men for the rest of their lives. During the township's early history, the then rural community would often produce agricultural goods and farmers would travel to Grand Rapids to sell their products.

==== Suburban growth ====
Gypsum mines in northeast Wyoming along Plaster Creek operated for decades and became more refined in 1880 when the Alabastine Company acquired much of the gypsum, later opening the Alabastine Mine in 1907. Wyoming Township began to grow as a suburb of Grand Rapids in 1890 with its next major area of development occurring in the northeast section of the township closest to Grand Rapids with much of the city's population moving southward in the early 1900s. The City of Grand Rapids started annexing portions of the township and by 1891 had annexed one square mile (2.6 km^{2}) of the city from Division to Clyde Park and from Hall to Burton. In 1902, the Grand Rapids, Holland and Chicago Railway promoted the creation of more plats in the Galewood, Urbandale, and Burlingame (GUB) neighborhoods, with the railway providing transportation to downtown Grand Rapids in fifteen minutes. From 1890 to 1906, thirty-two plats were in the GUB neighborhoods with communities bordering Grand Rapids developing into suburban areas where Dutch Americans predominately resided. In the GUB area, the Christian Reformed Church expanded with its Dutch churchgoers. Another section of Wyoming was annexed by Grand Rapids in 1916 that involved the half-mile from Burton to Alger and from Clyde Park to Division.

The growth of Wyoming saw the emergence of profitable businesses there, including the Leonard Refrigerator Company, the Pierre Marquette railroad car repair shop and gypsum mines. Gravel pits operated by Grand Rapids Gravel Company lined the western side of present-day Byron Center Avenue from 28th Street (then Beales Road) in the south to the north near Lamar Park – its nearby lakes being former pits – also provided jobs and gravel for roads in the expanding township. With the United States entering World War I, the federal government began construction of a picric acid factory on the west side of 44th Street and Clyde Park Avenue, employing thousands of people in the area and attracting others after rumors of an airplane factory on the site were spread, though construction would end following the Armistice of 11 November 1918. In the late 1910s and early 1920s in the GUB neighborhood, Hackett and later Lorraine automobiles were manufactured at a factory on Beverly and Burlingame Avenues.

Into the 1920s, Wyoming saw its population nearly triple, experiencing its period of largest growth, with city officials accustomed to rural affairs being overwhelmed with new developments, taking on tasks and issues as they occurred. Farmers in Wyoming began to sell their farms for development as prices for their produce declined, with farming families either assuming jobs in Grand Rapids or leaving the area. Since Wyoming did not have adequate zoning regulations like neighboring Grand Rapids, land speculators began the platting of small, cheap residential properties, especially the neighborhoods of Godwin Heights, Home Acres, Wyoming Park and along Division Avenue, with plat proposals occurring during every town meeting at the time. Materials from the cancelled picric acid plant were taken and used to construct some of these cheap houses, which had tarpaper roofs and lacked basements. The construction of these affordable home developments in Wyoming provided a cheap workforce for Grand Rapids. Citizens already established in the Grand Rapids and Wyoming area deplored the new residents who moved to the Home Acres and Division corridor, referring to the area as "Shanty Town" and as a place of crime. White Protestants in Wyoming also prevented African Americans from residing in the township, engaging in housing segregation and redlining, with some sales agreements explicitly stating that a property "shall never be occupied by a negro," extending such agreements to second parties, heirs and others. As a result of suburbanization the population of Wyoming had grown about 200% between 1920 and 1930, from 5,702 to 16,931 and the unorganized zoning of the township would cause issues for Wyoming throughout its future.

With Wyoming developing at such a rapid pace, the Grand Rapids city officials and affiliated business leaders attempted to deter the development of industry in Wyoming, fearing that Grand Rapids would lose skilled workers and wages would increase. One major incident of Grand Rapids preventing industrial development in Wyoming occurred in the early 1920s when Ford Motor Company attempted to purchase the unfinished picric acid factory that was being constructed during World War I. Kendall Furniture quickly purchased the property before Ford could acquire the site, later selling the property to repay back taxes.

==== Great Depression and General Motors ====
As the Great Depression affected the world's economy in the 1930s, Grand Rapids saw little industrial development as there was no demand for luxury furniture, the city's main economic product. During the economic depression, the cheap furniture laborers residing in Wyoming were laid off and at least twenty-five percent of citizens were unemployed. Wyoming teachers took a 45% pay cut and children had to share textbooks in school. A poor fund was established in 1931, though by September 1932, the $44,000 collected – the equivalent to $873,883 in 2021 – was insufficient for the project. Small construction projects by the Township provided some funds for residents, though they were only temporary measures, with tax deadline extensions from the Township becoming common throughout the Great Depression as individuals could not afford to pay taxes. By mid-1933, about 20% of Wyoming's workforce was unemployed.

During the depression, many residents of Wyoming grew disillusioned with the existing unchecked capitalism, small government practices and the laissez-faire economic system that relied on local governments, churches, and charities to provide the care for citizens. When President Franklin D. Roosevelt introduced the New Deal and federal social welfare programs – including the Civil Works Administration, Public Works Administration, and Federal Emergency Relief Administration to the United States, city residents strongly approved of these actions by his government. It was reported that men in Wyoming were grateful and wept when they were told that they would have a job for the first time in years as a result of Roosevelt's welfare programs. Roosevelt's program helped Wyoming pay workers to construct new bridges, parks, roads, schools, and sewers; with Ideal Park, Johnson Park, and the first township office being constructed with federal funding.

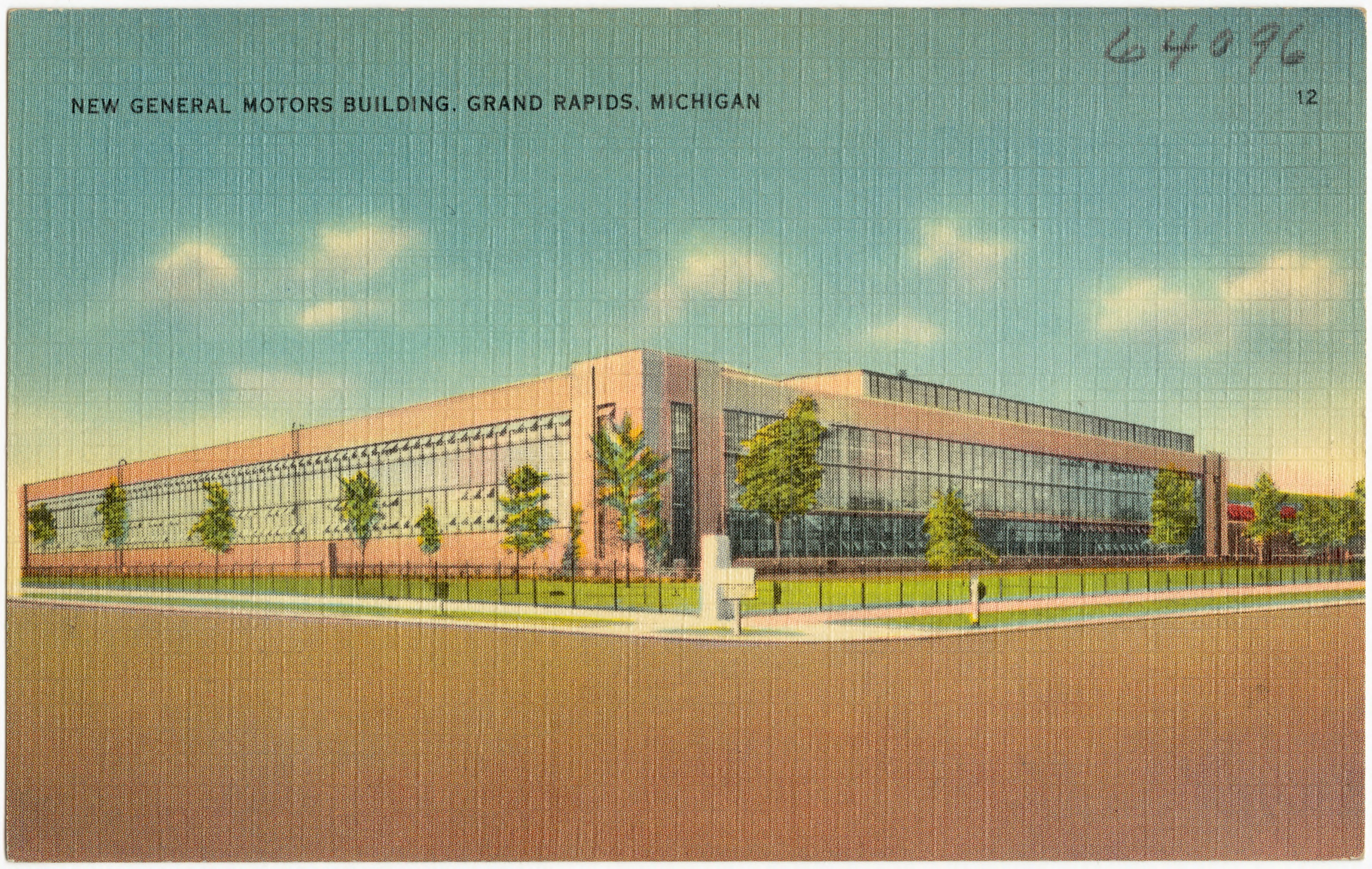
General Motors Stamping Division Plant, opened in 1936

Former Mayor of Grand Rapids George P. Tilma was elected supervisor of Wyoming Township in 1932 and was tasked with modernizing the developing suburban community from a rural town system. In 1933, Grandville was separated from Wyoming and was established as its own city. In the winter of 1933, Tilma was also able to circumvent the Emergency Banking Act in a technicality to purchase 555 tons of coal that was distributed to the poor to heat their homes. General Motors sought to construct a new facility in Grand Rapids, though there were no areas for development or future expansions, so the cities of Grand Rapids and Wyoming collaborated to have General Motors purchase land in Wyoming while Grand Rapids supplied utilities to the site. Tilma's expertise was instrumental in both secretly negotiating with Grand Rapids on utility work and with obtaining approval of the site by General Motors. The General Motors plant began construction on January 22, 1936, and Roosevelt's New Deal funding helped construct the sewer and water system for the factory. The first enrollment date for employees on April 6, 1936, saw a line of workers spanning nearly 1.5 miles (2.4 km) from the factory's entrance west of Buchanan Avenue and 36th Street, east to Division Avenue and then north 1 mile (1.6 km) to 28th Street, with the first metal stamps being shipped from the factory on June 1, 1936.

Following the construction of the General Motors stamping plant, development on Division Avenue increased extensively, with a new Kelloggsville High School being opened in September 1936 and a new Godwin Heights High School being approved in January 1937. Supervisor Tilma died suddenly in his office in April 1937 with his death being attributed to an intracerebral hemorrhage. As World War II began, Reynolds Metals opened a plant in the township that was initially to develop airplane material in 1942.

==== Post-war growth, push towards cityhood ====
Following World War II, Wyoming developed so rapidly that mobile homes began to appear on vacant properties throughout the city, with an ordinance being passed in 1947 to prevent this. In 1946, General Motors Diesel Equipment Division, which was later known as Delphi Automotive and today known as GM Components Holdings, began operations in an area of 45 acres (180,000 m^{2}) that was former swampland which was drained for a muck farm.

As Wyoming moved towards cityhood, the Township purchased 5 acres (20,000 m^{2}) of land from Judy Devine in December 1947 on the northeast corner of 28th Street and DeHoop Avenue, establishing the area known as the town center of Wyoming due to the increased development on 28th Street. A year later in 1948, Lake Alexander was drained and converted into what is now Jackson Park. In May 1948, a committee was created by the Township which recommended incorporating Wyoming into a city. As Wyoming pursued incorporation, Grand Rapids increased annexation attempts, with the annexation of GUB being defeated in April 1949.

The 1950s was the decade of Wyoming's fastest development, with homes developing so quickly that the Township experienced difficulties providing proper utilities to homes. Multiple wells were drilled throughout the area to provide water to the developing community after the water supply from Grand Rapids was discontinued, temporarily sparking political controversy surrounding water supplies. The Township board approved a route for U.S. Route 131 through Wyoming in July 1952 and 28th Street was widened from two to four lanes shortly after. In August 1956, a vote for incorporation into a city was narrowly defeated and the Ivanrest area was annexed by Grandville. Rogers Department Store, one of the largest department stores in Michigan at the time, opened on 28th Street in 1955. On November 6, 1958, voters approved the incorporation of Wyoming into a city.

=== City of Wyoming (1959–present) ===
==== Entertainment and retail destination ====
Photograph of the Beltline Drive-In in 1982, by John Margolies

In the 1960s, the city was able to launch several projects. The first was a sewage plant to take care of issues from the state in regards to dumping it in the Buck Creek and Grand River. The next was the completion of the Water Plant in Holland with a pipeline to the city.

New developments occurred over the decade on 28th Street, with free vehicle parking drawing some shoppers away from Grand Rapids. One major project was Rogers Plaza, which opened in August 1961 as the first indoor shopping mall in Michigan and one of the first in the United States, including stores such as S. S. Kresge, W. T. Grant, Kroger, A&P, Cunningham Drug, and Montgomery Ward. The neighboring Wyoming Village Mall opened later in 1961 and was anchored by Wurzburg's. Fruitbasket Flowerland also opened in 1961 providing lawn care tools, flowers, and outdoor furniture for the developing suburban homes. Gordon Food Service moved from Grand Rapids to Wyoming in 1962. Three annexation attempts by Grand Rapids were also defeated in that year: the Kent County Airport, the Blackburn neighborhood, and the Buchanan neighborhood.

Studio 28 opened on the 28th Street corridor in 1965 and expanded in size over decades into the world's first multiplex and the largest multiplex in the world in 1988. In July 1966, the Lake Michigan pipeline to Wyoming began to supply water to the city, a major accomplishment after years of difficulties with low-quality wells. By the end of the decade, the city faced fund shortages and multiple income tax proposals were turned down. Wyoming began to establish many municipal facilities in the 1970s, including a public works building, a centralized fire station, a combined police-justice building, and a new public library. By the 1980s, the city became concerned about the quality of developments, with adult bookstores and massage parlors appearing. In 1990, Reynolds Metals closed their operations in the city.

==== Great Recession ====
After over a decade of negotiations with the City of Grandville, including a promise by the developer to not build into Wyoming, Rivertown Crossings Mall opened in 1999 near the southwest border of Wyoming, causing many commercial tenants to leave the 28th Street corridor. In response, Wyoming unveiled a redevelopment plan for their city center that they hoped would revitalize businesses on the 28th Street corridor. For Rogers Plaza, the exterior was remodel and the former Montgomery Ward anchor store was demolished and replaced with a Family Fare supermarket. A street was also planned to stretch from Rogers Plaza across Michael Avenue to Wyoming Village Mall and further down to Studio 28, with commercial and apartment developments anticipated. The owners of Wyoming Village Mall ultimately disagreed with plans to tear down a portion of their building to develop the street.

In October 2003, the Delphi Automotive plant on Burlingame Avenue and Burton Street notified neighbors in the area that vinyl chloride had spread to the groundwater about 0.5 miles (0.80 km) to the north following the plant's use of trichloroethylene as a degreaser, with traces of the chemical detected since the 1980s. The once-popular Rogers Department Store closed in 2003. More business was lost in the late-2000s into the 2010s during the great recession, with the GM Fisher Body Plant closing in 2009 due to budget cuts by General Motors. Much of the commercial atmosphere of 28th Street also dwindled, with Studio 28 closing in 2008 and vacancy rates up to nearly 40% in 2011.

Redevelopment

In the mid-2010s, development spread to southern Wyoming. Gordon Foods expanded its headquarters in 2012 and development occurred near the recently built Metro Health Hospital. The 28 West plan was also initiated to make 28th Street a more pedestrian-friendly corridor while also centralizing the development of food, retail, and entertainment projects in the city's center, effectively creating a downtown area. 28 West Place Street, a street similar to Wyoming's 2002 proposal, was approved by the City and Wyoming Mall's owners in 2016, opening to the public in October 2017.

In 2019, Magnus Capital Partners was approved to construct apartments, named HōM Flats at 28 West, with the first residents moving into their homes in early 2020. By 2021, the City of Wyoming modified its original 28 West plan of establishing a downtown space, instead focusing on establishing "hubs" of development and giving Magnus Capital Partners more property to develop apartment blocks near 28th Street. Phase 3 of HōM Flats at 28 West, featuring 200 workforce housing units, received approval from the City of Wyoming's Brownfield Redevelopment Authority for Housing Tax Increment Financing in January 2025. In July, the Michigan State Housing Development Authority approved a $39 million loan for the project.

In 2022, Franklin Partners purchased the former land of the General Motors plant, known as Site 36, from the City of Wyoming for $5.25 million and started development discussions with four local companies and a few entities based outside of Michigan. In 2024, site plans were approved to turn the former General Motors area into a distribution center for Corewell Health. In 2025, Benteler Automotive constructed an industrial manufacturing facility on the former Site 36 location. Gelock Heavy Movers, Inc. began building an industrial facility on the site in 2026, marking the last phase of Site 36's redevelopment. In August 2025, the City of Wyoming opened the Godwin Mercado, a seasonal farmers market and community event center. The marketplace is located on a 5-acre parcel that was once the parking lot for Site 36.

In September 2025, a 12-foot wide ADA accessible pedestrian bridge spanning 28th Street between Burlingame Avenue and Clyde Park Avenue was opened. The bridge, which features lighting and a snow melt system, was 100% grant funded and did not involve any city property tax revenue. The bridge connects Wyoming's City Center to 4.6 miles of non-motorized ADA accessible trails completed in spring 2025.

== Geography ==
According to the U.S. Census Bureau, the city has a total area of 24.95 square miles (64.62 km^{2}), of which 24.74 square miles (64.08 km^{2}) is land and 0.22 square miles (0.57 km^{2}) (0.88%) is water.

The city is situated southwest of Grand Rapids and south of the Grand River. Buck Creek spans the city and created a valley of dark loam soil that was used historically for farming, while elevated land above the valley is dense clay soil. In the northern area of Wyoming just south of the Grand River, pockets of gravel and gypsum also exist. Some areas in Wyoming had caverns and sinkholes in the past, possibly created by water pockets eroding limestone and sandstone, though most of these features have likely collapsed due to their instability.

=== Major highways ===
- I-196 (Gerald R. Ford Freeway) runs along the northwestern edge of the city.
- BS I-196 (Chicago Drive) passes briefly through the northwest corner of the city.
- US 131 runs north–south through the center of the city.
- M-6 (Paul B. Henry Freeway) runs along a small portion of the southern edge of the city.
- M-11 (28th Street) runs west–east through the center of the city.

=== Climate ===
Wyoming has a humid continental climate (Köppen: Dfa).

Climate data for Wyoming
Month	Jan	Feb	Mar	Apr	May	Jun	Jul	Aug	Sep	Oct	Nov	Dec	Year
Mean daily maximum °F (°C)	30.7 (−0.7)	33.1 (0.6)	44.8 (7.1)	57.2 (14.0)	68.5 (20.3)	77.4 (25.2)	81.1 (27.3)	79.3 (26.3)	73.0 (22.8)	59.7 (15.4)	46.9 (8.3)	35.6 (2.0)	57.3 (14.1)
Daily mean °F (°C)	25.5 (−3.6)	26.6 (−3.0)	36.7 (2.6)	47.8 (8.8)	59.5 (15.3)	68.7 (20.4)	72.5 (22.5)	70.7 (21.5)	63.7 (17.6)	51.8 (11.0)	40.5 (4.7)	30.9 (−0.6)	49.6 (9.8)
Mean daily minimum °F (°C)	19.4 (−7.0)	19.2 (−7.1)	28.4 (−2.0)	38.8 (3.8)	50.2 (10.1)	59.7 (15.4)	63.7 (17.6)	62.1 (16.7)	54.7 (12.6)	43.9 (6.6)	34.2 (1.2)	25.9 (−3.4)	41.7 (5.4)
Average rainfall inches (mm)	1.10 (28)	1.02 (26)	2.24 (57)	3.68 (93)	4.64 (118)	3.74 (95)	3.59 (91)	3.58 (91)	3.10 (79)	3.70 (94)	2.31 (59)	1.47 (37)	34.17 (868)
Average snowfall inches (cm)	1.54 (3.9)	1.29 (3.3)	0.61 (1.5)	0.27 (0.69)	0.00 (0.00)	0.00 (0.00)	0.00 (0.00)	0.00 (0.00)	0.00 (0.00)	0.03 (0.08)	0.42 (1.1)	1.28 (3.3)	5.44 (13.87)
Source: Weather.Directory

== Demographics ==
Historical population
Census	Pop.	Note	%±
1850	543		—
1860	1,237		127.8%
1870	1,786		44.4%
1880	2,117		18.5%
1890	3,234		52.8%
1900	3,396		5.0%
1910	5,284		55.6%
1920	5,702		7.9%
1930	16,931		196.9%
1940	20,396		20.5%
1950	28,977		42.1%
1960	45,829		58.2%
1970	56,560		23.4%
1980	59,616		5.4%
1990	63,891		7.2%
2000	69,368		8.6%
2010	72,125		4.0%
2020	76,501		6.1%
2023 (est.)	77,451		1.2%
U.S. Decennial Census; 2010 2020

=== Racial and ethnic composition ===
Wyoming city, Michigan – Racial and ethnic composition Note: the US Census treats Hispanic/Latino as an ethnic category. This table excludes Latinos from the racial categories and assigns them to a separate category. Hispanics/Latinos may be of any race.
Race / Ethnicity (NH = Non-Hispanic)	Pop 2000	Pop 2010	Pop 2020	% 2000	% 2010	% 2020
White alone (NH)	55,801	49,208	44,409	80.44%	68.23%	58.05%
Black or African American alone (NH)	3,205	4,756	6,428	4.62%	6.59%	8.40%
Native American or Alaska Native alone (NH)	348	292	217	0.50%	0.40%	0.28%
Asian alone (NH)	2,015	1,992	2,430	2.90%	2.76%	3.18%
Native Hawaiian or Pacific Islander alone (NH)	21	26	20	0.03%	0.04%	0.03%
Other race alone (NH)	62	93	226	0.09%	0.13%	0.30%
Mixed race or Multiracial (NH)	1,212	1,748	3,348	1.75%	2.42%	4.38%
Hispanic or Latino (any race)	6,704	14,010	19,423	9.66%	19.42%	25.39%
Total	69,368	72,125	76,501	100.00%	100.00%	100.00%

=== 2020 census ===
As of the 2020 census, Wyoming had a population of 76,501. The median age was 34.3 years. 24.1% of residents were under the age of 18 and 12.1% of residents were 65 years of age or older. For every 100 females there were 97.1 males, and for every 100 females age 18 and over there were 95.2 males age 18 and over.

100.0% of residents lived in urban areas, while 0.0% lived in rural areas.

There were 28,820 households in Wyoming, of which 32.5% had children under the age of 18 living in them. Of all households, 44.0% were married-couple households, 19.6% were households with a male householder and no spouse or partner present, and 27.6% were households with a female householder and no spouse or partner present. About 26.6% of all households were made up of individuals and 8.4% had someone living alone who was 65 years of age or older.

There were 29,949 housing units, of which 3.8% were vacant. The homeowner vacancy rate was 1.3% and the rental vacancy rate was 5.0%.

Racial composition as of the 2020 census
Race	Number	Percent
White	47,618	62.2%
Black or African American	6,872	9.0%
American Indian and Alaska Native	782	1.0%
Asian	2,452	3.2%
Native Hawaiian and Other Pacific Islander	26	0.0%
Some other race	10,198	13.3%
Two or more races	8,553	11.2%

=== 2010 census ===
As of the census of 2010, there were 72,125 people, 26,970 households, and 18,128 families residing in the city. The population density was 2,927.2 inhabitants per square mile (1,130.2/km^{2}). There were 28,983 housing units at an average density of 1,176.3 per square mile (454.2/km^{2}). The racial makeup of the city was 75.8% White, 7.2% African American, 0.6% Native American, 2.8% Asian, 9.6% from other races, and 3.8% from two or more races. Hispanic or Latino of any race were 19.4% of the population.

There were 26,970 households, of which 37.2% had children under the age of 18 living with them, 47.1% were married couples living together, 14.4% had a female householder with no husband present, 5.7% had a male householder with no wife present, and 32.8% were non-families. 25.6% of all households were made up of individuals, and 7.3% had someone living alone who was 65 years of age or older. The average household size was 2.66 and the average family size was 3.22.

The median age in the city was 32.1 years. 27.1% of residents were under the age of 18; 10.5% were between the ages of 18 and 24; 29.9% were from 25 to 44; 23.5% were from 45 to 64; and 9% were 65 years of age or older. The gender makeup of the city was 49.3% male and 50.7% female.

=== 2000 census ===
As of the census of 2000, there were 69,368 people, 26,536 households, and 17,540 families residing in the city. The population density was 2,840.1 inhabitants per square mile (1,096.6/km^{2}). There were 27,506 housing units at an average density of 1,126.2 per square mile (434.8/km^{2}). The racial makeup of the city was 84.32% White, 4.85% African American, 0.59% Native American, 2.92% Asian, 0.04% Pacific Islander, 4.70% from other races, and 2.59% from two or more races. Hispanic or Latino of any race were 9.66% of the population.

There were 26,536 households, out of which 35.7% had children under the age of 18 living with them, 49.6% were married couples living together, 12.0% had a female householder with no husband present, and 33.9% were non-families. 26.6% of all households were made up of individuals, and 7.4% had someone living alone who was 65 years of age or older. The average household size was 2.60 and the average family size was 3.19.

In the city, the population was spread out, with 28.0% under the age of 18, 10.9% from 18 to 24, 33.7% from 25 to 44, 18.0% from 45 to 64, and 9.4% who were 65 years of age or older. The median age was 31 years. For every 100 females, there were 97.5 males. For every 100 females age 18 and over, there were 95.0 males.

The median income for a household in the city was $43,164, and the median income for a family was $50,002. Males had a median income of $35,772 versus $25,482 for females. The per capita income for the city was $19,287. About 5.1% of families and 7.3% of the population were below the poverty line, including 8.8% of those under age 18 and 6.9% of those age 65 or over.

=== Religion ===
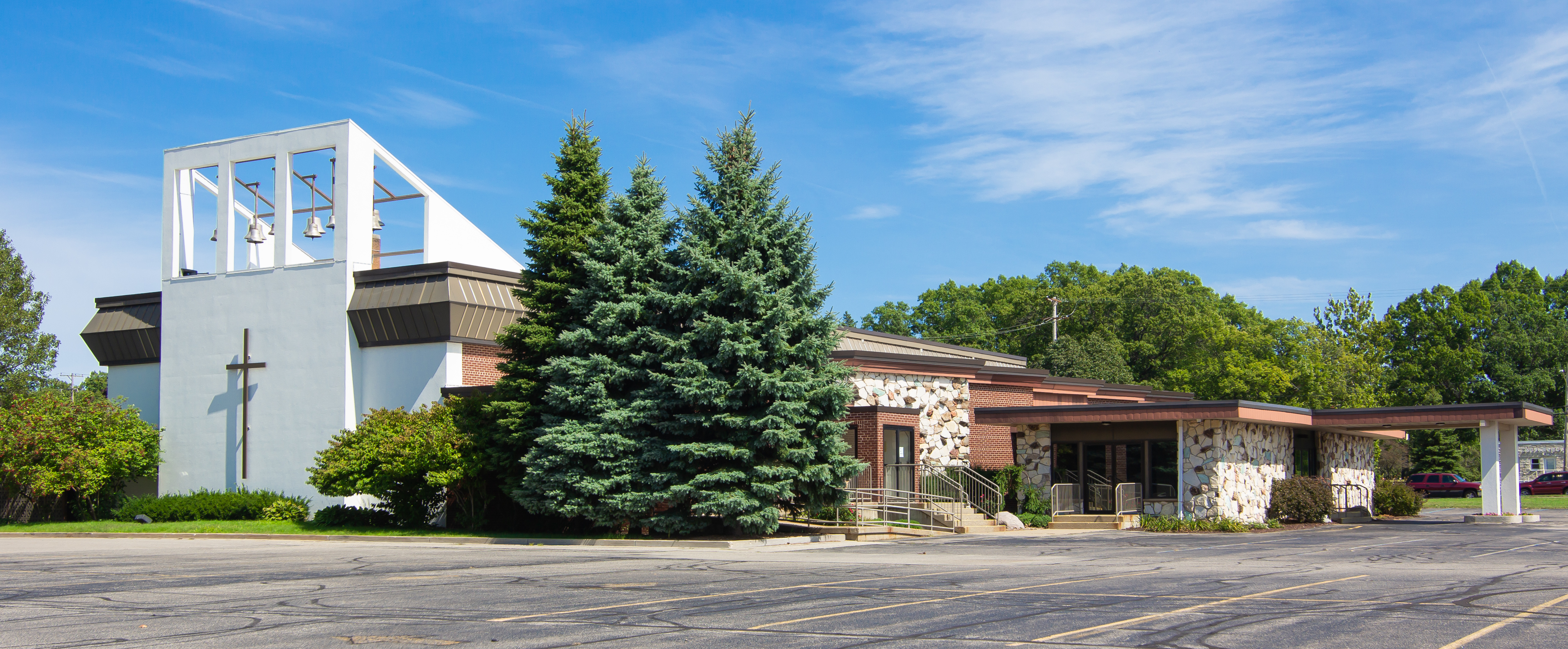
St. John Vianney Catholic Church

Christian Reformed Dutch settlers established the first churches in Wyoming, with Grandville Avenue Christian Reformed Church being founded in 1891, which is now part of The Potter's House school. Holy Name of Jesus Catholic Church was built in 1908, serving as the place of worship for Roman Catholics in Wyoming. The Episcopal population established the Holy Trinity Episcopal Church at the site of a former chicken coop in 1957. The Assemblies of God established a church in 1929 and moved to their current location on 44th Street in 1977, with the facility being able to seat 1,400 people.

== Economy ==
As of the 2000 census, there are presently 10 types of industries in the city. Manufacturing accounts for 30%, retail 16%, education, health, and social services 15%, with the next five industries accounting for 6%, and transportation, warehousing, utilities accounting for 3% of business in the city. The manufacturing segment is unique in that it is the largest in West Michigan. It currently produces auto parts, industrial machinery, commercial printing, plastics, food processing, electronics, tool and dies, concrete supplies, and fire engines.

After Grandville allowed development of a new 6-anchor shopping complex, Rivertown Crossings Mall, and the related development, many major retail businesses in Wyoming folded, including the long-standing Roger's Department Store, its successor, and most tenants of Rogers Plaza. The City of Wyoming formed a Downtown Development Authority spanning 28th Street from Byron Center Avenue to Division Avenue. in an effort to help support the city in keeping businesses in the area in 1999.

In the 2000s, plans were being made to revitalize the 28th Street corridor. In 2013, the City of Wyoming introduced the 28 West plan, a plan to develop downtown Wyoming along 28th Street into a more pedestrian friendly environment that will provide food, retail, and entertainment. In June 2016, plans began moving forward on the 28 West plan with the demolition of part of the Wyoming Village Mall and the creation of a new road through the surrounding parking lots to attract developers.

=== Largest employers ===
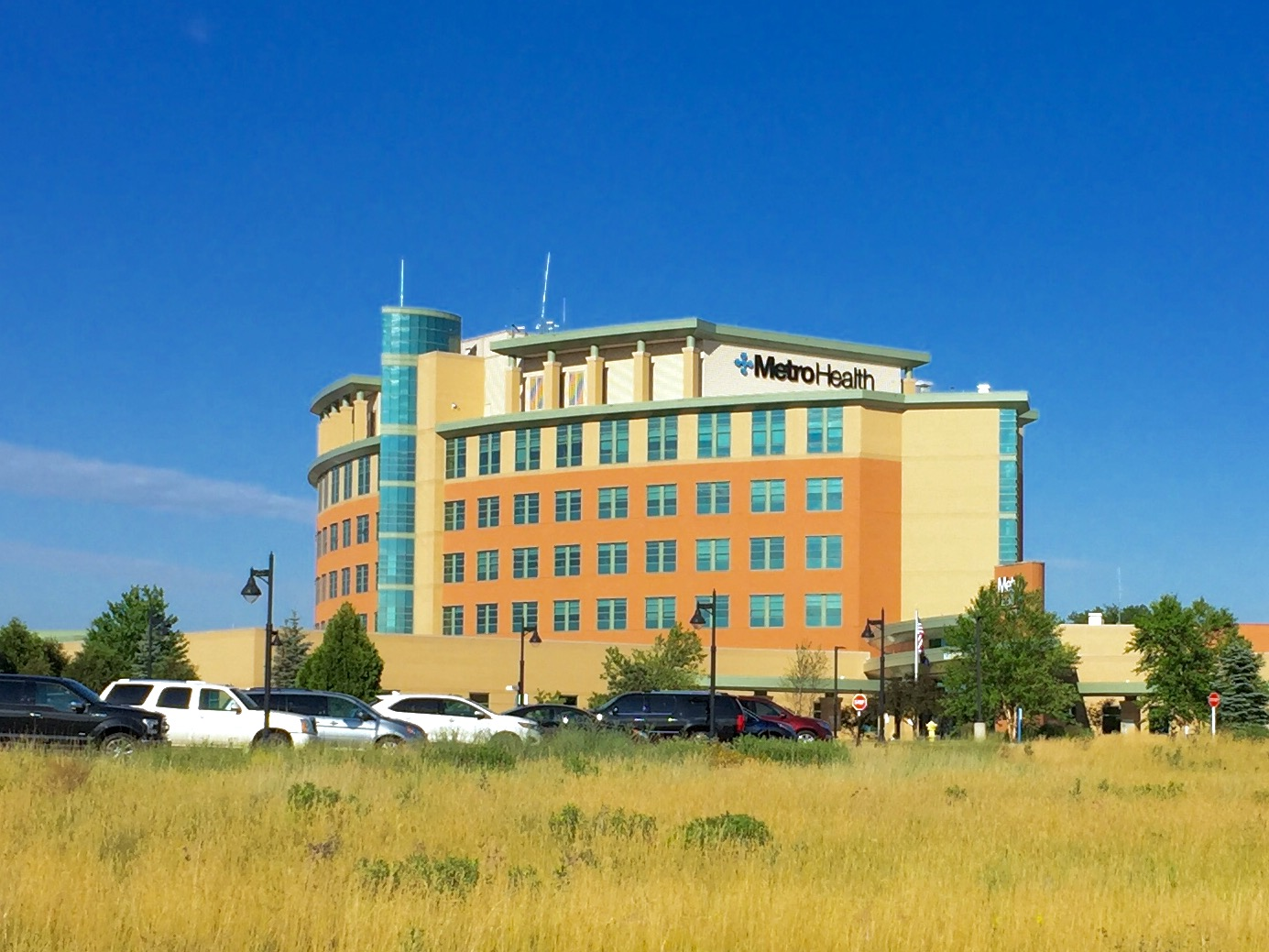
Metro Health Hospital, the second largest employer in Wyoming

According to the City's 2025 Comprehensive Annual Financial Report, the largest employers in the city are:

#	Employer	# of Employees	% of city employment
1	Gordon Food Service	5,000	8.90%
2	Metro Health Hospital	3,000	5.34%
3	GM Components Holdings	1,200	2.14%
4	ABC Technologies	650	1.16%
5	Benteler	580	1.03%
6	Kellogg's Snacks	500	0.89%
7	Advantage Solutions	450	0.80%
8	Undercar Products Inc.	400	0.71%
9	Lumbermen's Inc	400	0.71%
10	Michigan Turkey Products	400	0.71%

== Arts and culture ==
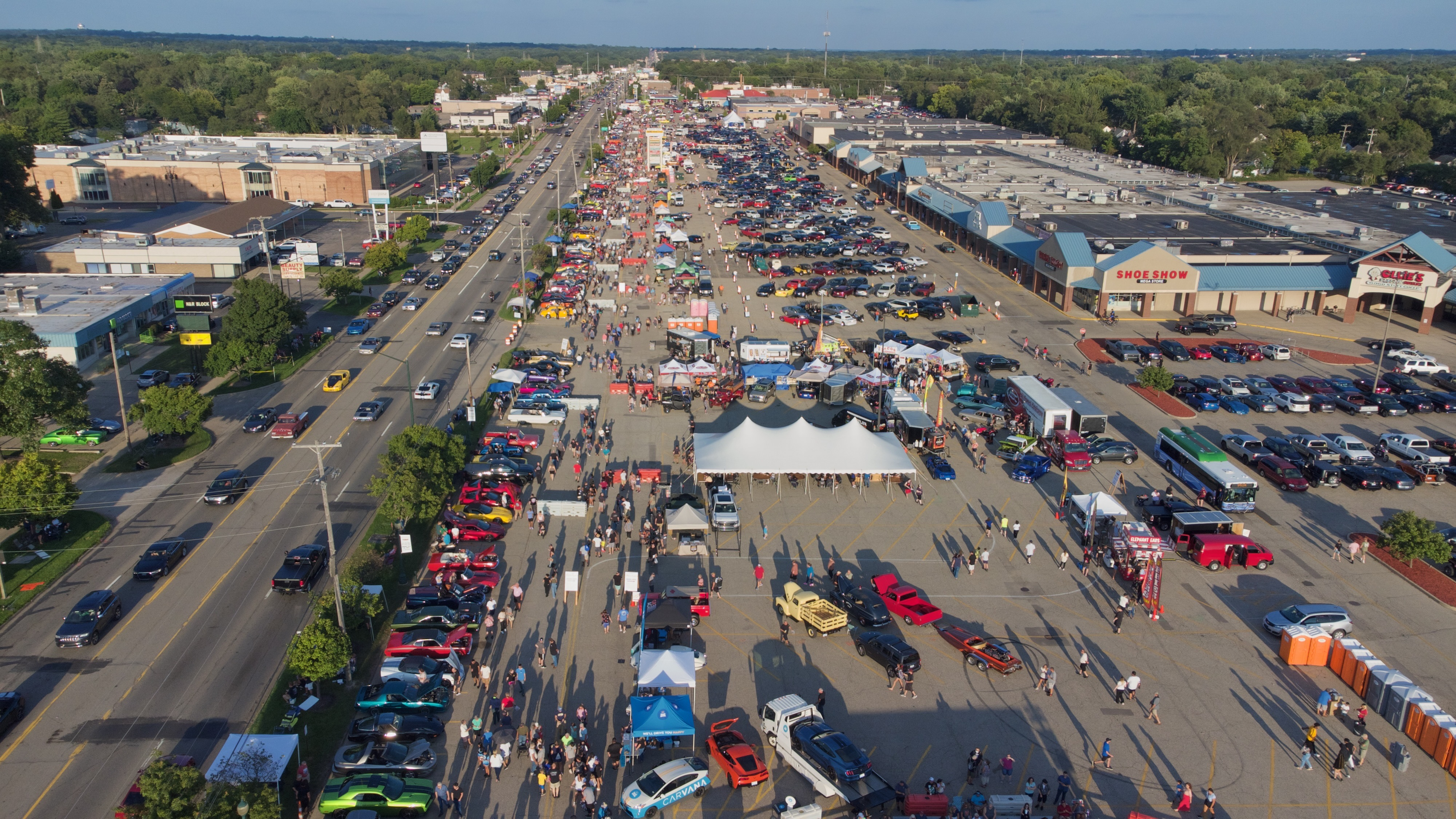
A view of vehicles on 28th Street and parked at Rogers Plaza during the Metro Cruise

The city has 21 parks that cover about 665 acres (2.69 km^{2}) which offer a multitude of activities. The parks department has been active in the past decade in redeveloping the parks in the city. Many parks have been rebuilt which included adding new equipment, splash pads, and facilities. They have also added a few new facilities such as a small skateboard park near one of the highest density areas of the city. The city also offers a Senior Center that provides activities for the older citizens of the city and the surrounding region. Along with the parks is the Kent Trails system that converted abandoned rail lines to bike paths. It is a collaborative effort between multiple local governments. The most recent addition to the Wyoming Park System is the Dog Park located next to Marquette Park at the very northern edge of the city. It is a privately funded park with access controls to restrict usage to registered members.

In 2002, the new Wyoming Public Library was built and is owned by the city but run by the Kent District Library System. It is a 48,950-square-foot (4,548 m^{2}) facility with over 112,046 items. The library branch is also the highest attended in the Kent District system with 670,842 items checked out and 439,599 visits in 2009. The library currently has around 76% of the population holding a card to use the facility. The building houses the Wyoming Historical Commission that holds historical materials of the city. Along with Historical Commission room, it houses the library for the blind and an art gallery.

Starting in 2005, the Wyoming-Kentwood Chamber of Commerce put together the 28th Street Metro Cruise that draws in automobile enthusiasts from the region. It currently spans 15 miles (24 km) from its start in Grandville at Wilson and 28th where drivers gather and drive to the cruise's end in Cascade Township. The cruise runs on Friday and Saturday on the last weekend of August.

== Government ==
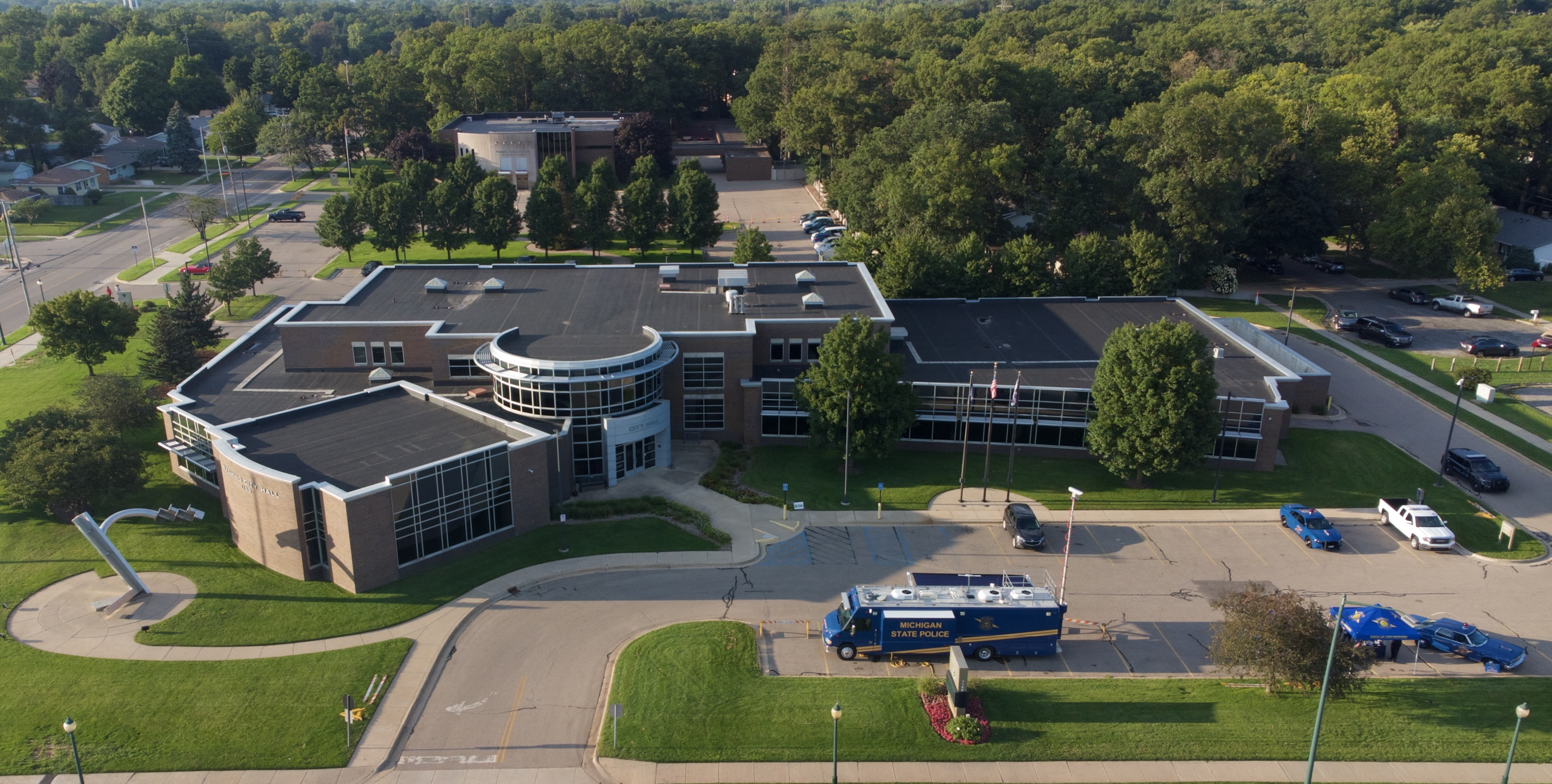
Wyoming City Hall and district court

The city has a council-manager government with both an elected mayor and an appointed city manager. Kent Vanderwood serves as Wyoming's mayor after defeating Sam Bolt and Cliff Tompkins in the 2022 election. The City Council is composed of six members: three at-large and a representative from each of the three wards. The current council members are: Sheldon DeKryger, Renee Hill, Robert Arnoys, Kyle Brethauer (1st Ward), Marissa Postler (2nd Ward), and Rob Postema (3rd Ward/Mayor Pro-Tem). Meetings are held at the City Hall on the first and third Mondays of every month. Work sessions are held the second Monday of each month.

=== Politics ===
The first documentation of political parties in Wyoming was during the 1894 United States elections, with the majority of votes in the city supporting the Republican Party. Wyoming used a caucus election system that was frequently plagued with ballot stuffing until the Township switched to a primary election system in 1928. Republican support was strong in Wyoming until the Great Depression when Democratic Party candidate Franklin D. Roosevelt was elected President of the United States in the 1932 United States presidential election. Prior to this, only Republican candidates would run for office in Wyoming, though in 1933 elections, members of the Communist Party USA and Democrats entered as candidates, with one Democrat being elected into local office. The Communist Party would make its last run for local office in 1935. In 1937, voters in then Wyoming Township elected its first Democratic supervisor, Herman Wierenga. In Wyoming's 1954 elections, citizens voted Democrats into every office, with the Democratic Party maintaining a strong position in the city since then.

Following the 2020 United States presidential election, MLive reported in 2022 that mayor-elect Kent Vanderwood was included among a Michigan contingent of Republicans allegedly involved in the Trump fake electors plot, reportedly organized as one of the attempts to overturn the 2020 United States presidential election in favor of incumbent President Donald Trump. In January 2023, former member of the Michigan House of Representatives, Tommy Brann, was appointed by the City Council to be council-member-at-large. On July 18, 2023, Mayor Kent Vanderwood, along with 15 other people statewide, was indicted by the Michigan Attorney General for his role in the 2020 fake electors plot.

=== Public safety ===
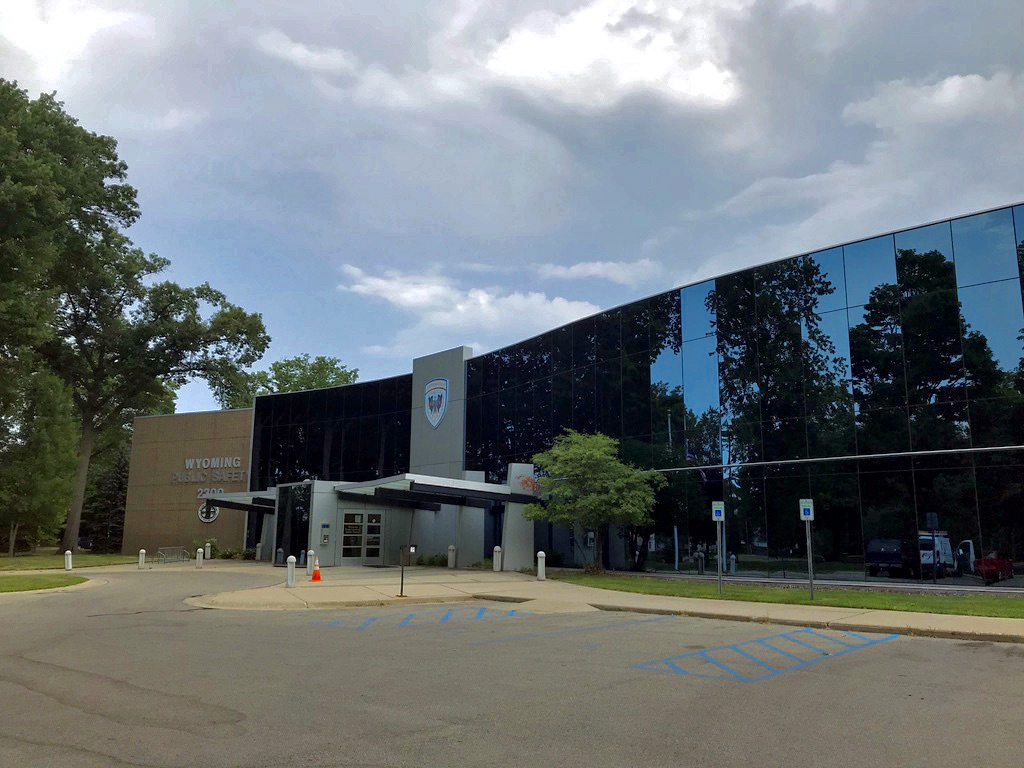
Wyoming Police Headquarters

On September 30, 2007, Metro Health Hospital moved from southeast Grand Rapids to its current location on the south central section of Wyoming. Spectrum Health and St. Mary's also have urgent care centers located in Wyoming with their hospitals located in downtown Grand Rapids.

The Wyoming Police Department has over eighty sworn police officers serving as of 2013. In 2014, Wyoming Police Department and Wyoming Fire Department amalgamated their administrative offices into the Police Headquarters building, creating the new entity of Wyoming Department of Public Safety.

== Education ==
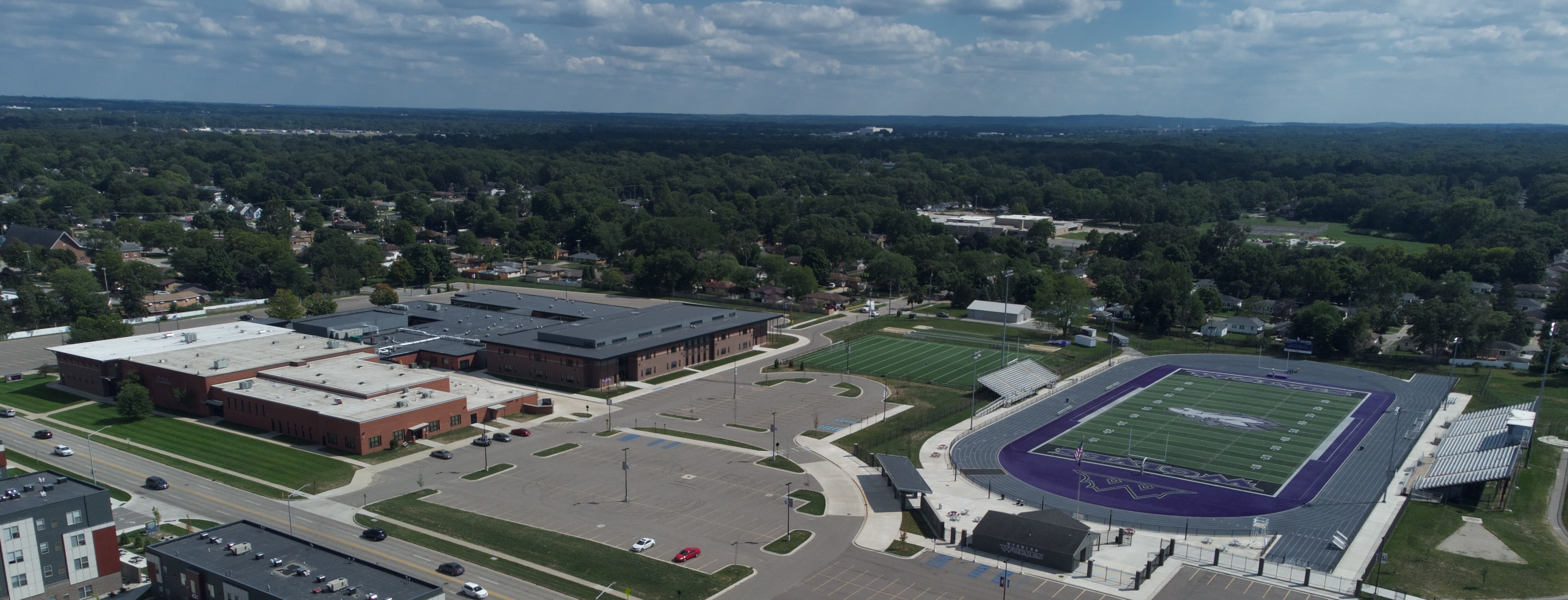
Wyoming High School

The city is served by 8 school districts. The southwest panhandle is served by Grandville Public Schools, the south extension of the city near Metro Health is served by Byron Center Public Schools, the central part is served by Wyoming Public Schools, the southeast is served by Kelloggsville Public Schools, the area south of 56th St and east of the railroad tracks is served by Kentwood Public Schools, a small annexed section near Hall St and Freeman Avenue is served by Grand Rapids Public Schools, the northeast is served by Godwin Heights Public Schools, and finally the northern section of the city is served by Godfrey-Lee Public Schools.

Of the eight districts only four do not have the majority of the buildings in the city. Grand Rapids Public Schools, Kentwood Public Schools and Byron Center Public Schools do not have any schools in the City of Wyoming; Grandville Public Schools has most of its schools outside of the Wyoming city limits. The remaining four districts do have many schools in the Wyoming city limits: 13 elementary schools, 3 out of 13 middle schools, 4 out of 8 high schools, with Godfrey-Lee having a combination middle high school located in the city.

The Potter's House, a Christian K-12 school, maintains its high school campus in Wyoming. Holy Trinity Lutheran School is a Pre-K-8 grade school of the Wisconsin Evangelical Lutheran Synod in Wyoming. The Roman Catholic Diocese of Grand Rapids has two K-8 schools, St John Vianney School and San Juan Diego Academy.

For higher education the city is served by Grand Rapids Community College in downtown Grand Rapids. In Allendale, northwest of the city, there is Grand Valley State University. Further universities can be found in Lansing, Big Rapids, and Kalamazoo. Also located in the immediate area is Hope College in Holland, Davenport University in Caledonia Township, Calvin College on the east side of Grand Rapids, Aquinas College also on the east side of Grand Rapids, Cornerstone University on the northeast side of Grand Rapids, along with Grace Bible College. The Protestant Reformed Theological Seminary is located in 4949 West Ivanrest Ave Wyoming, Michigan.

== Infrastructure ==
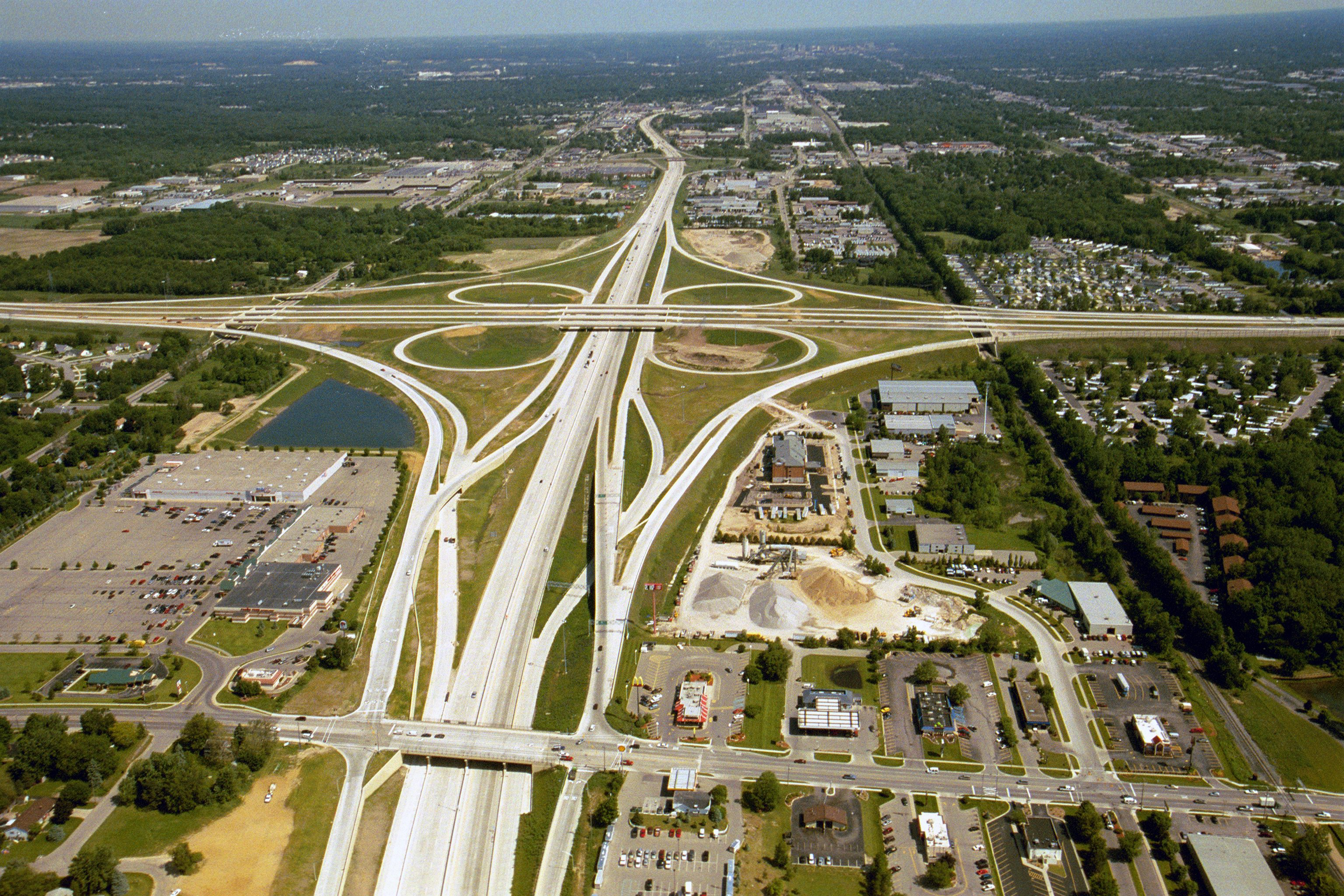
Aerial photo of the US 131/M-6/68th St. interchange in southern Wyoming looking north.

=== Public transit ===
The city is part of the Grand Rapids-based Interurban Transit Partnership, called The Rapid. It currently runs Routes 1, 3, 8, 10, 16, 24, 28, and 44 in the city of Wyoming; that is 8 out of the system's 26 routes. Currently the U.S. Department of Transportation is funding a good portion of a new transit system for the area. It will run along Division Avenue on the east side of the city from its southernmost point to the downtown. It is a bus rapid transit system with only 5 projected stations on the route inside of the city. The new line will be run by The Rapid.

=== Utilities ===
Currently the city provides water and sewer to the majority of the citizens. Electricity is supplied by Consumers Energy with natural gas nominally supplied by DTE Energy. Garbage service is supplied by individual contractors to homeowners and by law they are required to use the county incinerator, although the city does provide a yard waste drop off center. For both phone and cable, service is supported by both AT&T and Comcast. Cell phone carriers are on the whole fully supported with a number of towers.

== Notable people ==
- Chris Kaman, professional basketball player
- Buster Mathis, professional boxer
- Buster Mathis Jr., professional boxer
- Drew Neitzel, professional basketball player
- Dave Rozema, former baseball pitcher
