= Alabastine Mine =

Gypsum mine in Michigan, United States

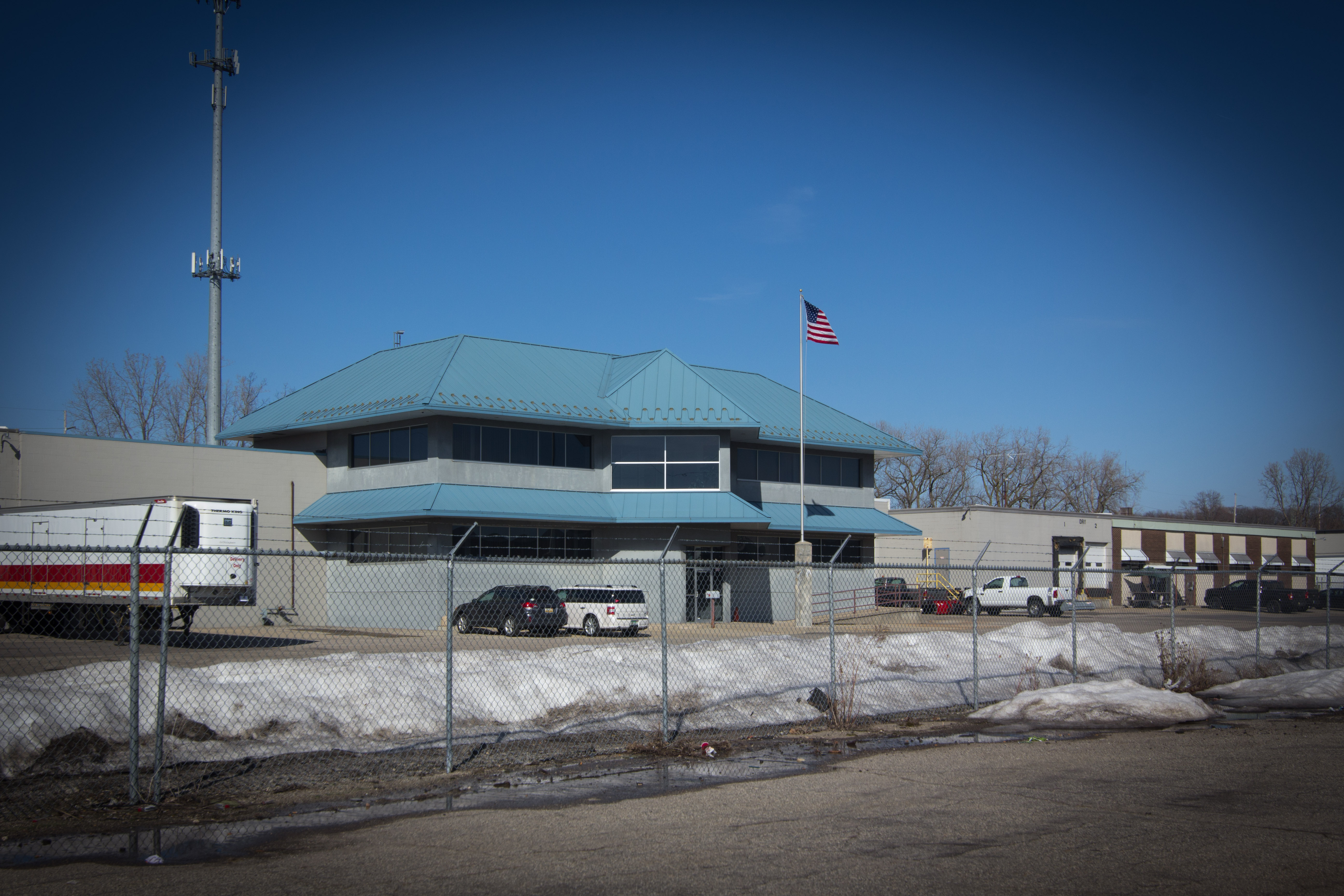
- Alabastine Mine office

- Location within Michigan
- Location: Wyoming, Michigan, United States; 42°56′29″N 85°42′02.12″W
- Products: Gypsum
- Opened: 1907
- Website: http://naturalstorage.com/

The Alabastine Mine is an underground gypsum mine in Wyoming, Michigan, originally dug by hand in 1907. The mine once included an underground stable for the mules used to haul the gypsum.

== Plaster production ==
The gypsum from this mine was used to manufacture plaster, both for exterior use as stucco and for a tinted interior wall covering known as 'alabastine'.

== Use as a fallout shelter ==
New access elevators to the mine were constructed in order to convert the mine to a storage area. Parts of the mine served as a Cold War fallout shelter.

== Storage facility ==
Since 1957, the mine has been operated by Michigan Natural Storage as a storage facility. It leases space to a firm that provides microfilm records storage for many Michigan courthouses.
