= Norton Mound group =

Archaeological site in Michigan, United States

- U.S. National Register of Historic Places
- U.S. National Historic Landmark
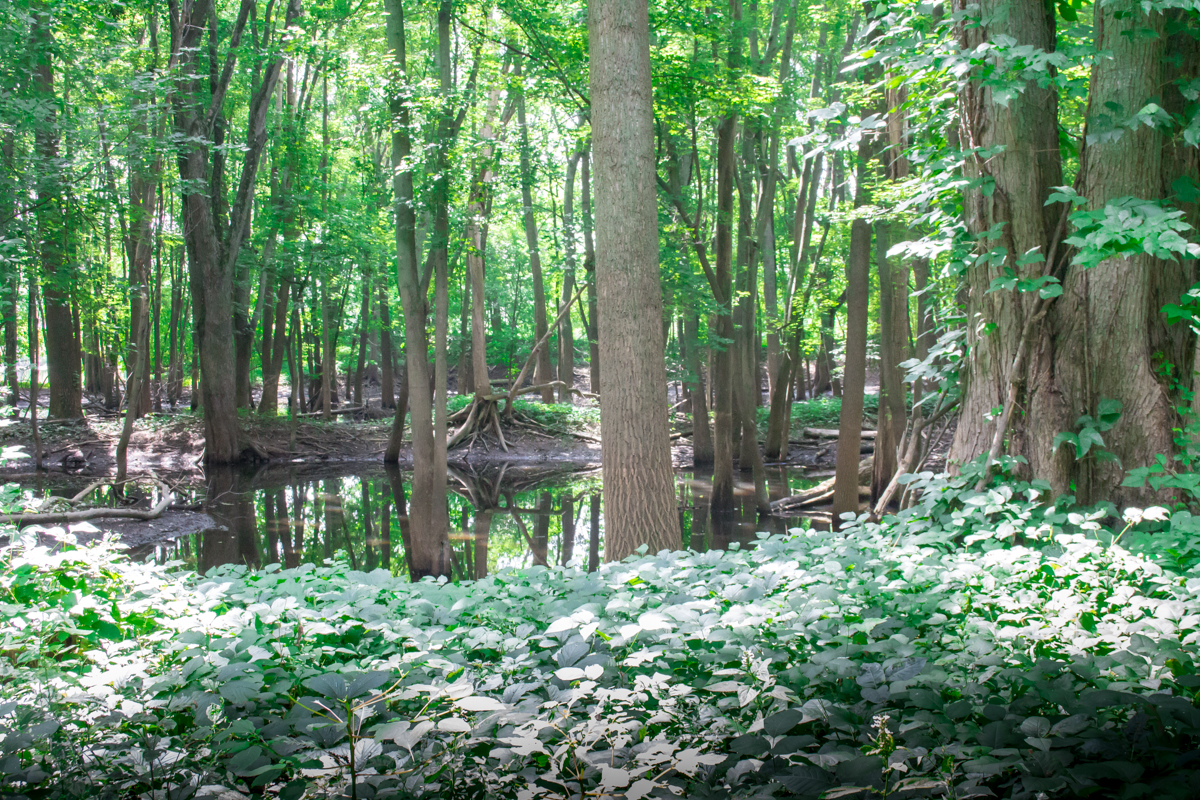

- Location within Michigan Location within the United States
- Interactive map
- Nearest city: Wyoming, Michigan
- Coordinates: 42°56′11.69″N 85°43′19.13″W
- NRHP reference No.: 66000396

Significant dates
- Added to NRHP: October 15, 1966
- Designated NHL: December 21, 1965

The Norton Mound group, (also known as Norton Mound Site (20KT1) and Hopewell Indian Mounds Park), is a prehistoric Goodall focus mounds site in Wyoming, Michigan that is under the protection of the Grand Rapids Public Museum.

== Significance ==
According to the National Park Service's Statement of Significance: "These are the most important and best-preserved Hopewell mounds in the western Great Lakes region.

== History ==
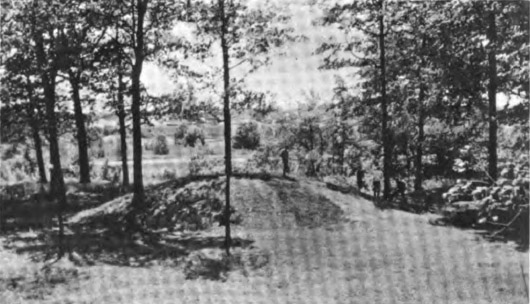
Mound H

The Norton Mound group was the center of Hopewellian culture in that area, from ca. 400 B.C. to A.D. 400. These mounds were probably constructed in the first century AD.

The name "Norton Mounds" comes from Captain A.N. Norton, who owned this property in the 1800s. The mounds were first excavated in 1874 by W. L. Coffinbury. This excavation revealed numerous burials rich in grave offerings. Further excavations were undertaken by H. E. Sargent in 1915. In 1936, Mrs. W. B. Stiles deeded the land that many of the mounds were located on to the city of Grand Rapids, and the area became a city park. The site was listed on the Michigan Register of Historic Sites in 1957, and it was declared a National Historic Landmark in 1965.

Later excavations in 1963-1964 by James B. Griffin provided information on mound construction methods.

According to the National Park Service, "Severe erosion, flooding, and nearby development threaten the Mound Group." "The Public Museum of Grand Rapids has been awarded funding to complete a Cultural Landscape Management Plan that will assess the site's condition. Public awareness of the NHL has increased due to ongoing development of the Millennium Park." That plan was completed in February 2007.

== Description ==
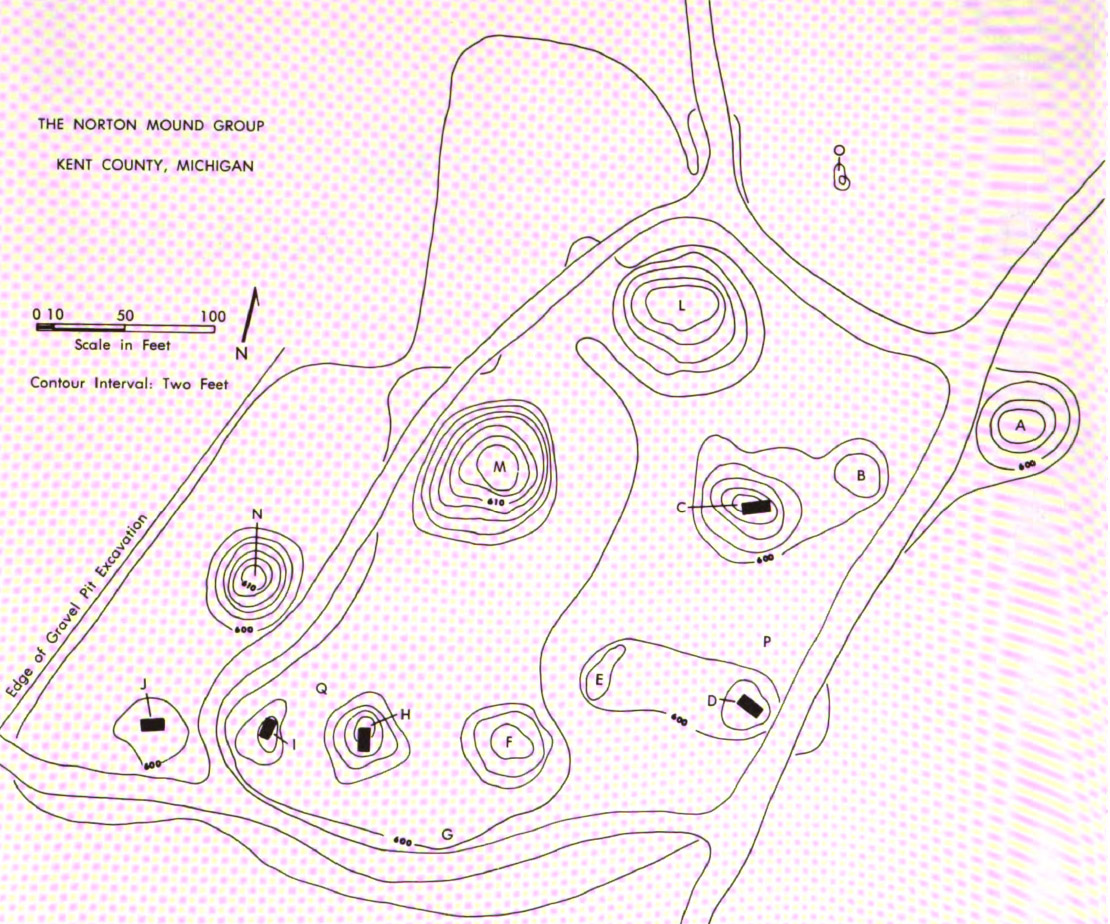
Map of mound locations

The site of the mounds is located between Indian Mounds Drive and Interstate 196 in Wyoming, Michigan near the Grand River. The Norton Mounds site covers approximately 55 acres and is currently closed to the public. The Norton Mounds were once part of a more extensive grouping of mounds that included the Converse Mounds (20KT2), a grouping of nearly thirty mounds near what is today downtown Grand Rapids. The Converse Mounds were razed in the nineteenth century as Grand Rapids expanded, and no trace remains of them today.

As of Coffinbury's initial exploration in 1874, there were 17 mounds in the group. In 1936, these 17 mounds were labelled A through Q. The three largest mounds are located near the river, with the other mounds arranged in a curved line behind them. By 1963, only eleven of the 17 were substantially untouched, and four had been obliterated.

The remaining mounds range from 30 feet in diameter and 1.5 feet in height to 100 feet in diameter and 15 feet in height. The mounds are built of a series of layers, starting with a layer of black dirt, then a layer of "ash" (probably the remains of leafy branches), then a mound fill cap, and finally a layer of natural sod. Below these layers are burial pits; these are primarily below ground level, although in the largest mound (mound M), the burial chambers are above the level of the surrounding grade. The burial pits are shallow and rectangular in shape.

Burial pits contained human remains, and nearby burial goods. The burial goods included jars, cups, dishes, spoons, arrowheads, pipes, tools, beads, pearls, and shell items.

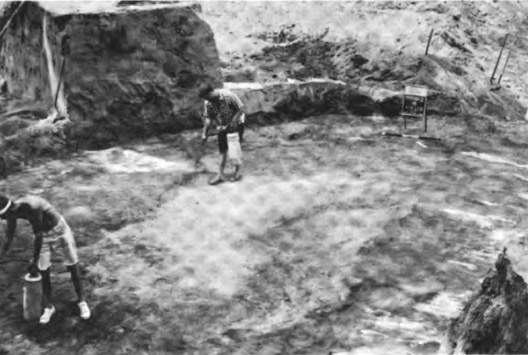
Excavation of Mound M

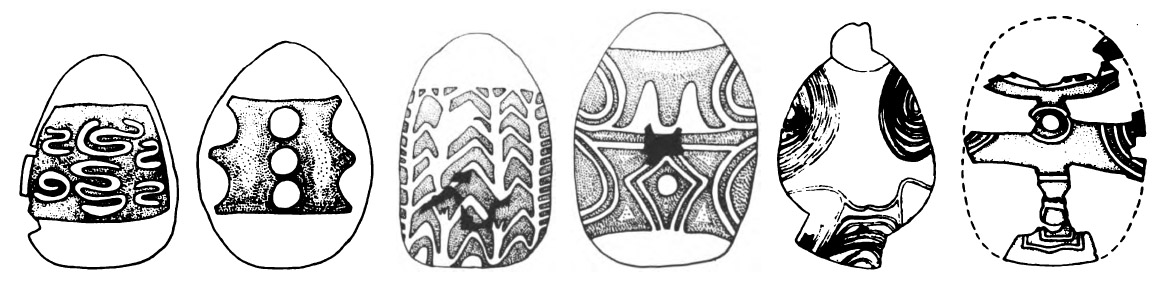
Geometrical engravings from turtle carapaces

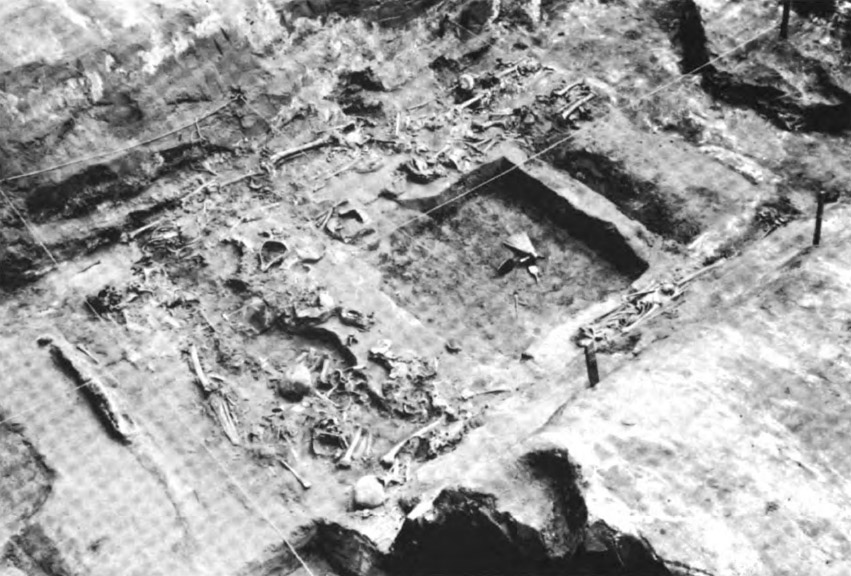
Burial Chamber, Mound M

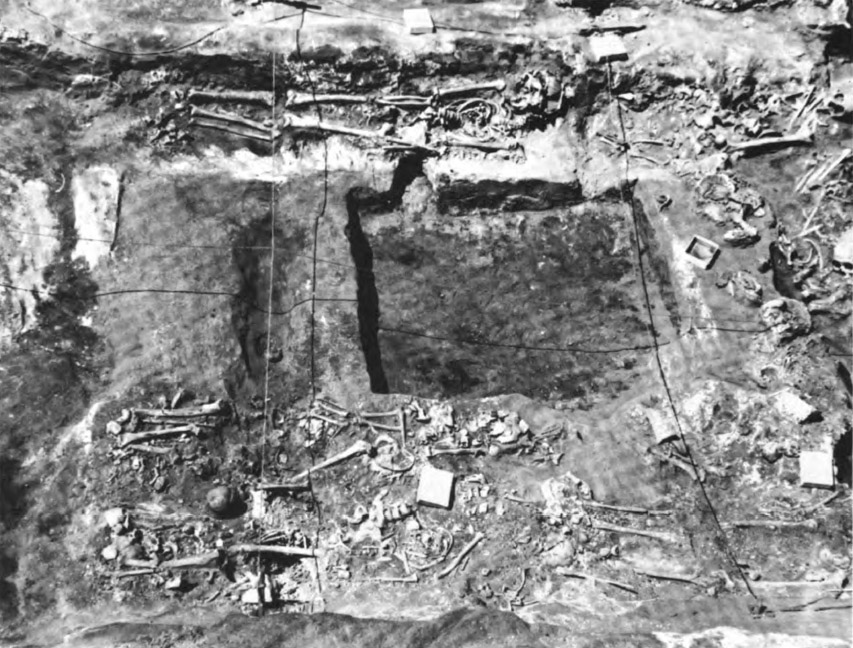
Burial Chamber, Mound M

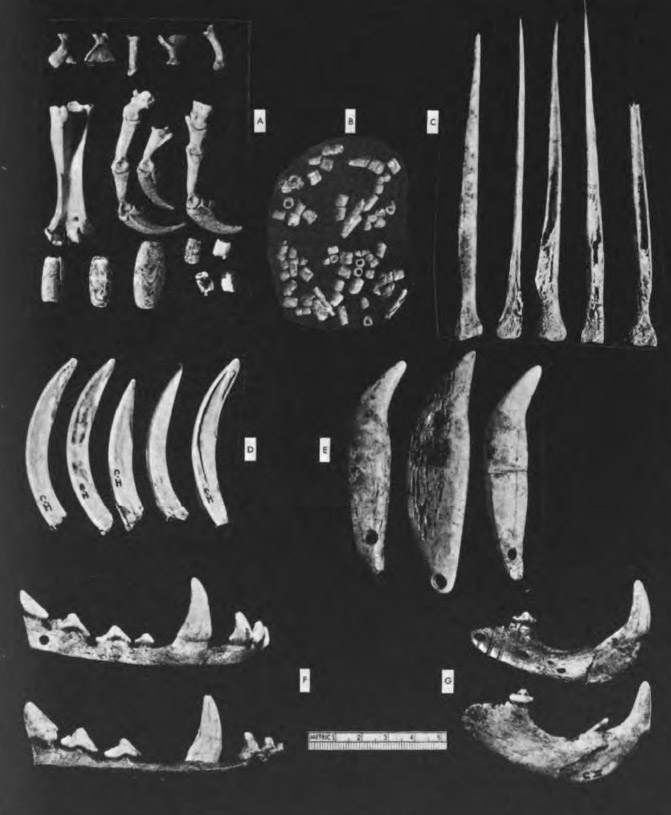
Ornaments from Norton Mounds

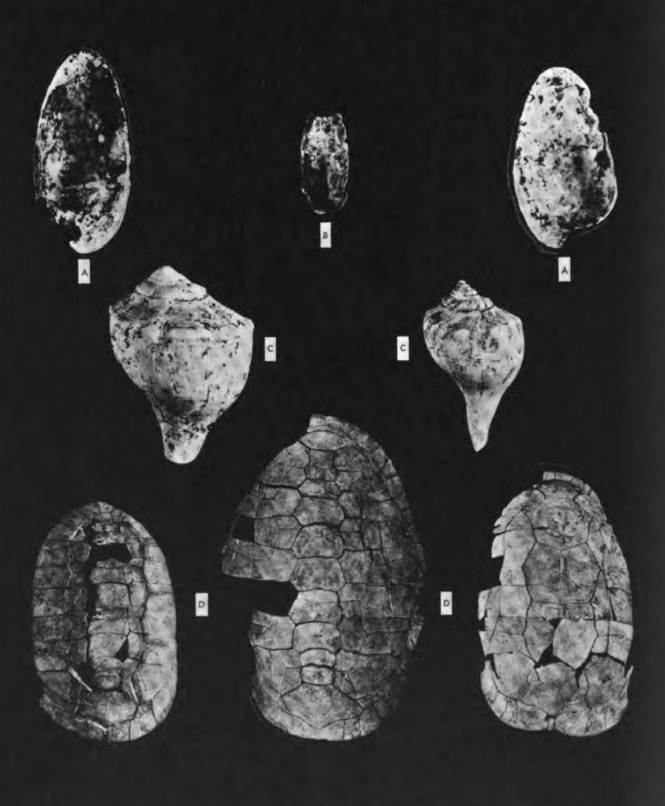
Burial Utensils from Norton Mounds

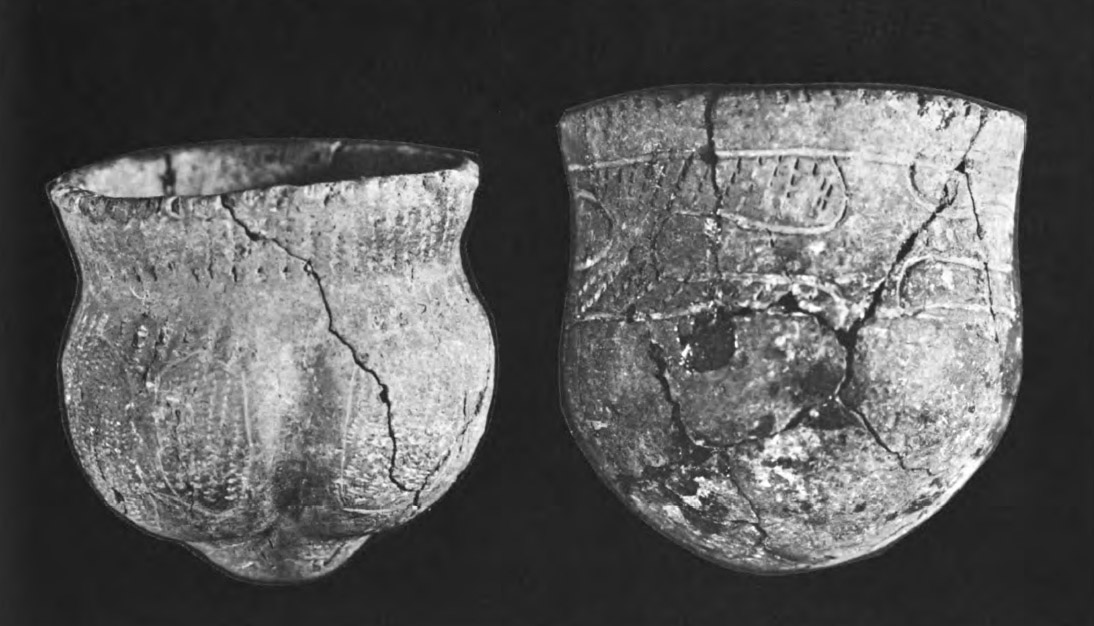
Hopewell Pottery from Mound M

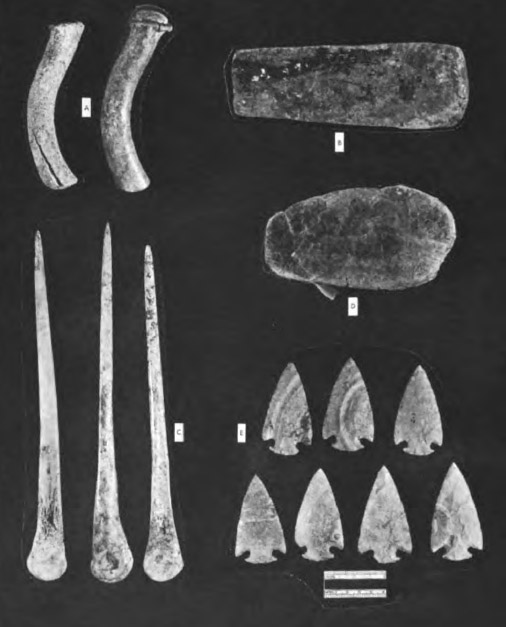
"Work kit" from Norton Mounds
