= Kent Vanderwood =

American politician

Mayor of Wyoming, Michigan
- Incumbent
- Assumed office December 5, 2022

City Council of Wyoming
- In office 2006–2022

Personal details
- Education: Grand Valley State University; Western Michigan University

Kent Vanderwood (born 1953 or 1954) is an American politician who is the mayor of Wyoming, Michigan, previously serving as a city council member for four terms from 2006 to 2022. In July 2023 he was charged for his participation in the Trump fake electors plot during the 2020 United States presidential election. As a result, calls for his recall or resignation were advanced. As of 2023, Mayor Vanderwood has said he will not resign.

== Early life and education ==
Vanderwood has lived in West Michigan his entire life. He received degrees in education from Grand Valley State University and Western Michigan University.

== Political career ==
=== City Council ===
Since the 1980s, Vanderwood has been involved in political campaigns. In 1995, Vanderwood moved to Wyoming, Michigan. He was elected to the Wyoming city council in 2005 and re-elected in November 2009.

He was re-elected for his third term on August 6, 2013. In 2013, he opposed recommendations of a consolidated metropolitan police force representing Grand Rapids, Kentwood and Wyoming, saying that the departments have separate union contracts and that the closure of Wyoming's police station would result in the consolidated force focusing more on Grand Rapids.

In 2018, he was re-elected to the city council. While serving his fourth term, he voted for the prohibition of short-term rental properties, such as Airbnb, within Wyoming. After a small group of residents said that the regulation was not strictly enforced, Vanderwood suggested that citizens form neighborhood associations.

=== Mayor ===
On December 5, 2022, Vanderwood was sworn in as mayor of Wyoming, citing goals of maintaining low taxes and increased public safety funding. He had won 5,635 votes (56%) in the city's primary election on August 2, 2022.

== 2020 United States presidential election ==
Vanderwood served as a delegate to the 2020 Republican National Convention for the Michigan Republican Party, voting to nominate Donald Trump for the 2020 United States presidential election. On December 14, 2020, Vanderwood's signature was included in a list of sixteen signatures casting an electoral vote for Trump presented by Ian Northon, an attorney of the Thomas More Society, at the Michigan State Capitol, who suggested that the list of electoral votes could be used by Michigan legislators if they decided not to use the official electoral vote list provided by the Democratic Party. At the time, expert of constitutional law Richard Friedman of the University of Michigan described the act as a "stunt", summarizing the incident by stating "There's nothing preventing any group of 16 people from getting together and saying 'we're electors,' but it doesn't have any legal force". According to MLive Media Group, the Trump campaign attempted to send the Michigan Republican electoral vote list to be recognized by Vice President Mike Pence during the 2021 United States Electoral College vote count. "During the 2020 campaign, he was chair of the 2nd District Republican Party, according to local press reports."

On July 18, 2023, Michigan Attorney General Dana Nessel charged Vanderwood and the fifteen other individuals who signed the document with eight felonies, including conspiracy, the forgery of election documents, and counterfeiting records. Some citizens called for the resignation of Vanderwood and others supported him following the release of charges, while Michigan State Representative John Fitzgerald of Wyoming called on the mayor to recuse himself from official acts until proceedings were finalized. Vanderwood's attorney said that the mayor would not resign, stating "Mr. Vanderwood had no intent to defraud anyone or any organization when he signed the Certificate of Votes of the 2020 Electors from Michigan during the time when lawsuits challenging the 2020 presidential election were pending in Michigan. ... Mr. Vanderwood will be fully vindicated". Vanderwood pleaded not guilty to the charges in August 2023.

== Other endeavors ==
Vanderwood served in positions for West Michigan non-profit, charity and other organizations; he was vice president of development for Mel Trotter Ministries, a member of the Wyoming/Kentwood Area Chamber of Commerce, chairman of the Greater Wyoming Community Resource Alliance, a board member for the Grand Valley Metropolitan Council and development director of The Potter's House. With real estate agent Rusty Richter, he is a co-owner of Success Partners, a political and non-profit consulting firm.
