= Buck Creek (Kent County, Michigan) =

Coordinates: 42.910304°N 85.7780891°W

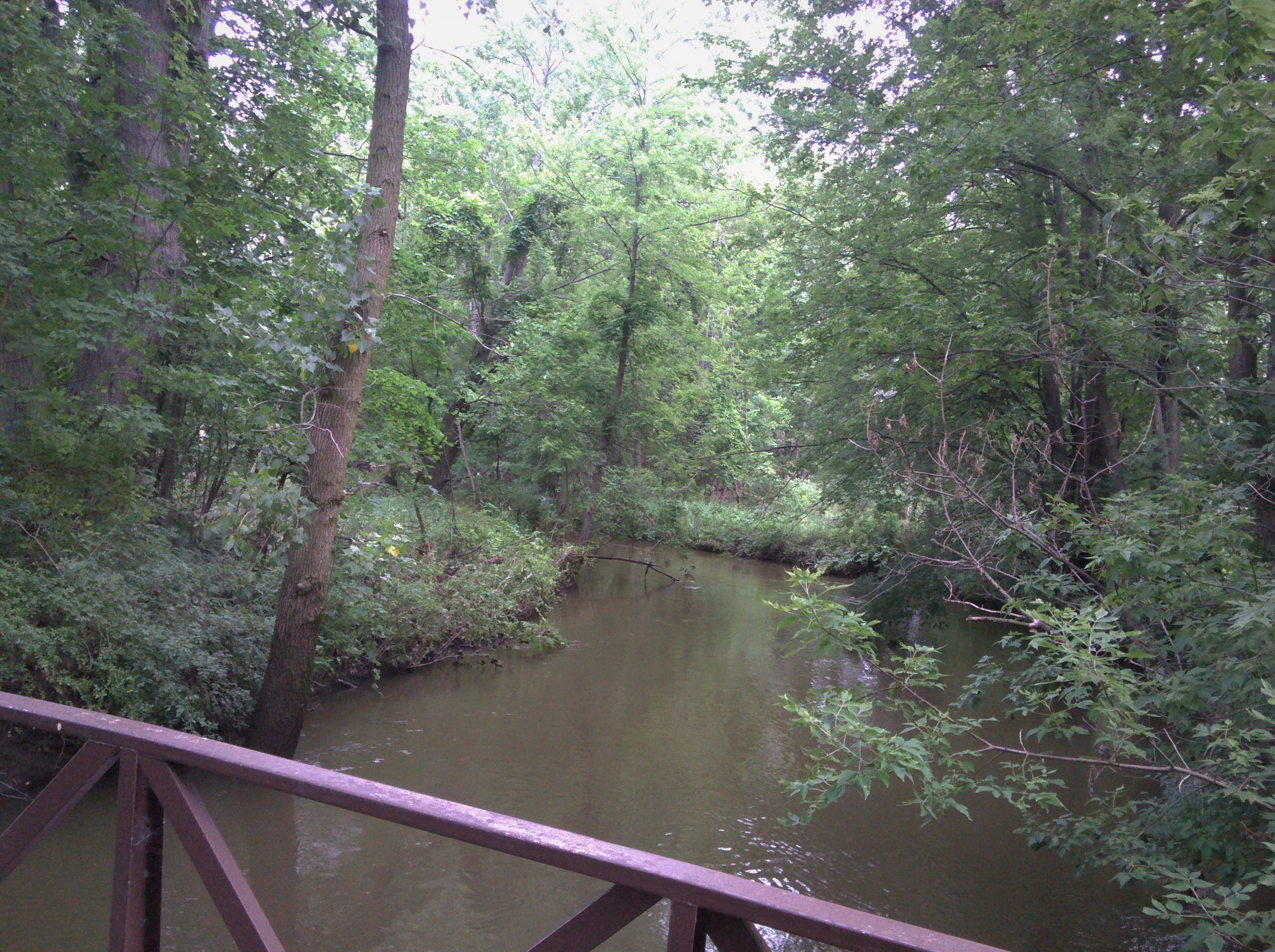

Location
- Country: United States
- Cities: Byron Township, Gaines Township, Wyoming, Kentwood, Grandville

Physical characteristics
- Source
  - location: Kent County, Byron Twp., Gaines Twp.
- Mouth
  - location: Grand River at Grandville, Michigan
- Basin size: 51 mi^{2} (130 km^{2})
- Discharge
  - location: mouth
  - average: 59.95 cu ft/s (1.698 m^{3}/s) (estimate)

Basin features
- River system: Grand River

Buck Creek is a 20.3-mile-long (32.7 km) tributary of the Grand River in Kent and Allegan counties in the U.S. state of Michigan. It rises in northern Allegan County in Byron and Gaines townships, and flows through the cities of Kentwood and Wyoming as an urban stream to enter the Grand River in Grandville. The Grand River is a tributary of Lake Michigan.

== Hydrology ==
The creek drains portions of Byron Township, Gaines Township, the City of Kentwood, the City of Wyoming, the City of Grandville, and Grand Rapids. Pine Hill Creek and Sharps Creek enter Buck Creek in the city of Wyoming. Other tributaries have been incorporated into the Kent County drain system.

== Ecology ==
The Michigan Department of Natural Resources engages in fish stocking the creek with brown trout in certain locations on an annual basis.

== Parks ==
=== Buck Creek Trail ===
The City of Grandville and the City of Wyoming teamed up to build a trail system that follows Buck Creek. The project started 30 years ago and has developed into a system of beautiful trails along the creek. The trail is currently in three segments. One from the Baldwin Street Trailhead in Jenison, Michigan to Broadway St. in Grandville. This is the newest segment. The next is down Canal St. to the Grandville segment which goes through Wedgewood Park. The third piece is the Wyoming segment which starts at Lemery Park, goes through the Buck Creek Nature preserve and finishes out at Palmer Park. Westmichigantrails.com says it takes some navigational skills to complete but is well worth the effort in the end.

=== Wedgwood Park ===
Wedgwood Park is located on Wilson Avenue in Grandville, Michigan, next to Oakestown Intermediate. The park includes a football field with small sets of bleachers on either side. The football field is used by Grandville Rocket Football and is the home of the Grandville Girls Rugby Club. The park has bathrooms, a playground, a pavilion with picnic tables, stand-up charcoal grills, benches, and a bridge that connects to Oakestown Intermediate. Part of Buck Creek Trail goes through the park and has multiple benches with views of Buck Creek.

=== Lemery Park ===
Lemery Park is located just off of Byron Center about a half mile north of 44th street (4050 Byron Center Ave. SW) The park is about 87 acres with Buck Creek and the Buck Creek Trail both running through it. The park has tennis courts, basketball courts, little league and softball fields, restrooms, picnic area, a concession stand and a walking trail. The park also has playground equipment and space to run around. Since Buck Creek runs through it there are many great opportunities for fishing. It is a park useful for activities, picnics, exercise, and nature.

=== Palmer Park ===
Palmer Park is located at 1275 52nd Street SW Wyoming, MI 49509. It is partially surrounded by Kaufman Golf Course (4807 Clyde Park). The park has baseball diamonds, biking, cross country skiing, fishing, an 18-hole golf course, picnicking, hiking/walking, a playground, an open shelterhouse, and restrooms.

=== Kelloggsville Park ===
5100 Haughey SW Kellogsville Park is about 8.5 acres. Kent County Bike Trail runs through the park. The park has Softball fields, a great playground, tennis courts, basketball courts, restrooms, picnic area, a shelter, and charcoal grills.

=== Veteran's Park ===
Located on 48th street between Eastern and Division. The park was built and run by the City of Kentwood. The park covers 15 acres. The park has a splash pad, restrooms, three sided picnic shelters, a large charcoal grill, soccer fields, tennis courts, basketball courts, and a sand volleyball court. The park has a few different playgrounds, a climbing wall, swings, baby swings, play structures, and climbers.

=== Kelloggs Woods Park ===
199 Kellogg Woods Park Dr SE, Kentwood The park has a baseball diamond, two softball fields, a soccer field, a skate park, a small climbing structure, a playground, and plenty of room to run around.

=== Buck Creek Nature Preserve ===
Buck Creek Nature preserve covers 37.5 acres in Wyoming, Michigan. The park contains many trails and boardwalks, public restrooms, picnic areas and much access to Buck Creek itself, presenting many fishing opportunities. The residents of Wyoming will sometimes refer to this park as “Pickle Park” due to the amount of homosexual activities that occur there. The park is located at 4269 Burlingame Avenue, Wyoming, Michigan 49519.
