= Wyoming Police Department =

- Seal

Agency overview
- Formed: April 3, 1848

Jurisdictional structure
- Operations jurisdiction: Wyoming, Michigan, United States
- Map of the Wyoming Police Department's jurisdiction

Operational structure
- Headquarters: 2300 DeHoop Ave SW; Wyoming, MI
- Sworn members: 103 (2025)
- Agency executive: Kimberly Koster, Public Safety Chief

Website
- Police department website

The Wyoming Police Department is a municipal police department of the city of Wyoming, Michigan.

== History ==
=== Wyoming Township ===
The Wyoming Police Department was originally established as a constabulary on April 3, 1848. The first force included four constables; William Richardson, Charles J. Rogers, James A. Britton, Henry N. Roberts. During the times of prohibition in the United States from 1920 to 1933, constables policed Wyoming to prevent moonshine and alcohol production. Moonshine was so prominent and sought for in Wyoming that it was occasionally used in payment transactions. In one prominent event in July 1932, over 500 gallons of alcohol, six firearms and a list of customers that included notable local officials were seized from a home at 3900 Burlingame Avenue.

The Wyoming Township Police Department was formed on December 12, 1941, and continued to use constables. Wyoming Township employed three full-time constables known as the "Wyoming Cowboys" that were stationed at the temporary township hall on Burton and Godfrey. The first police car was a Ford V8 that was purchased in January 1942 for $915 ($18,030 in 2025).

The constables were then temporarily located at 1263 Burton until the township purchased 5 acres (20,000 m^{2}) of land in December 1947 on the northeast corner of 28th Street and DeHoop Avenue, constructing a town hall at the location in 1948 due to the increased development on 28th Street.

In March 1949, the department arrested Raymond Fernandez and Martha Beck who murdered Delphine Downing and her toddler Rainell during a lonely hearts crime. Wyoming police discovered the bodies of Downing and her child in freshly-laid concrete in Downing's basement, with the brutality of the murders receiving nationwide coverage in the United States. Fernandez and Beck were ultimately extradited to New York for previous crimes, were tried and executed by electric chair in March 1951.

In 1952 Wyoming Township Police Department was moved one last time to the public works garage near the town hall.

=== City of Wyoming ===
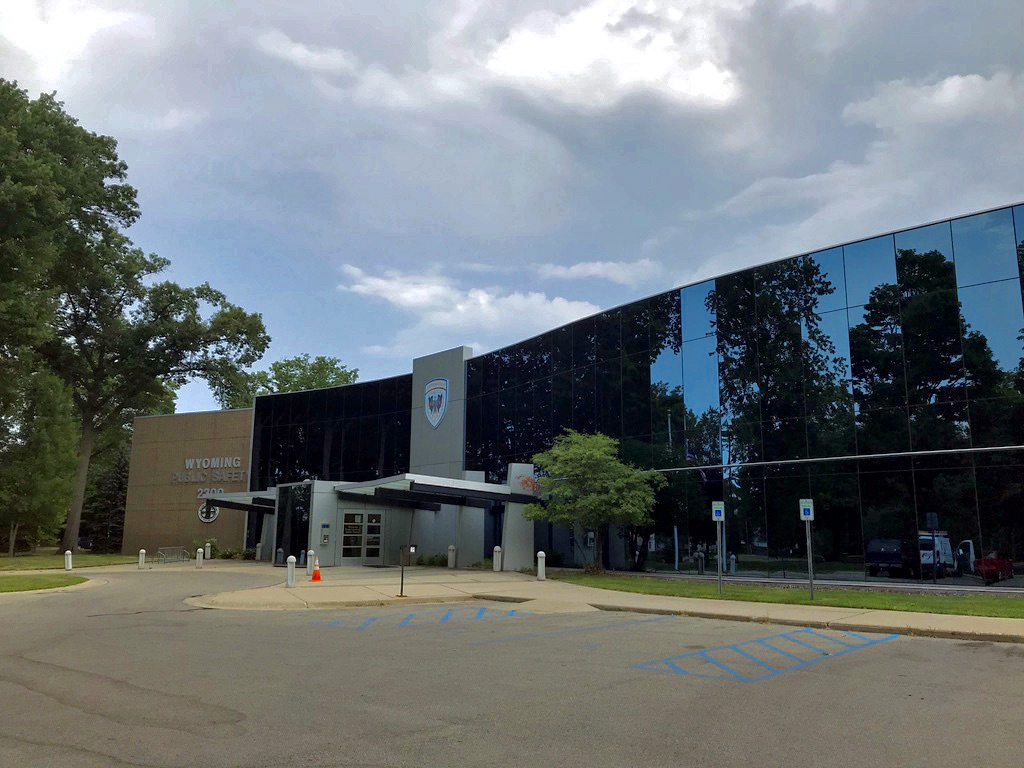
Wyoming Police Headquarters

The City of Wyoming was incorporated on January 1, 1959, with seventeen officers being sworn that year, growing to twenty-seven officers and nine vehicles by the next year.

By 1976, there were seventy-six sworn officers and the police station was moved to the Police-Justice Building at 2650 DeHoop Avenue, with the police being located on the second floor. The building was constructed at a cost of $1.2 million.

In 1994, the department's pistol team won the Governor's Trophy after competing against seven-hundred other officers from other jurisdictions in Michigan.

In the 2000s, Wyoming built a 54,000 square feet (5,000 m^{2}), two-story headquarters at 2300 DeHoop Avenue on land that was originally donated by the Rogers Family. As of 2013, the police department had eighty-three sworn officers serving the community. The Wyoming Police Department and Wyoming Fire Department had their offices merge in 2014, becoming the Wyoming Department of Public Safety.
