= The Potter's House (school) =

Coordinates: 42.936975°N 85.686921°W

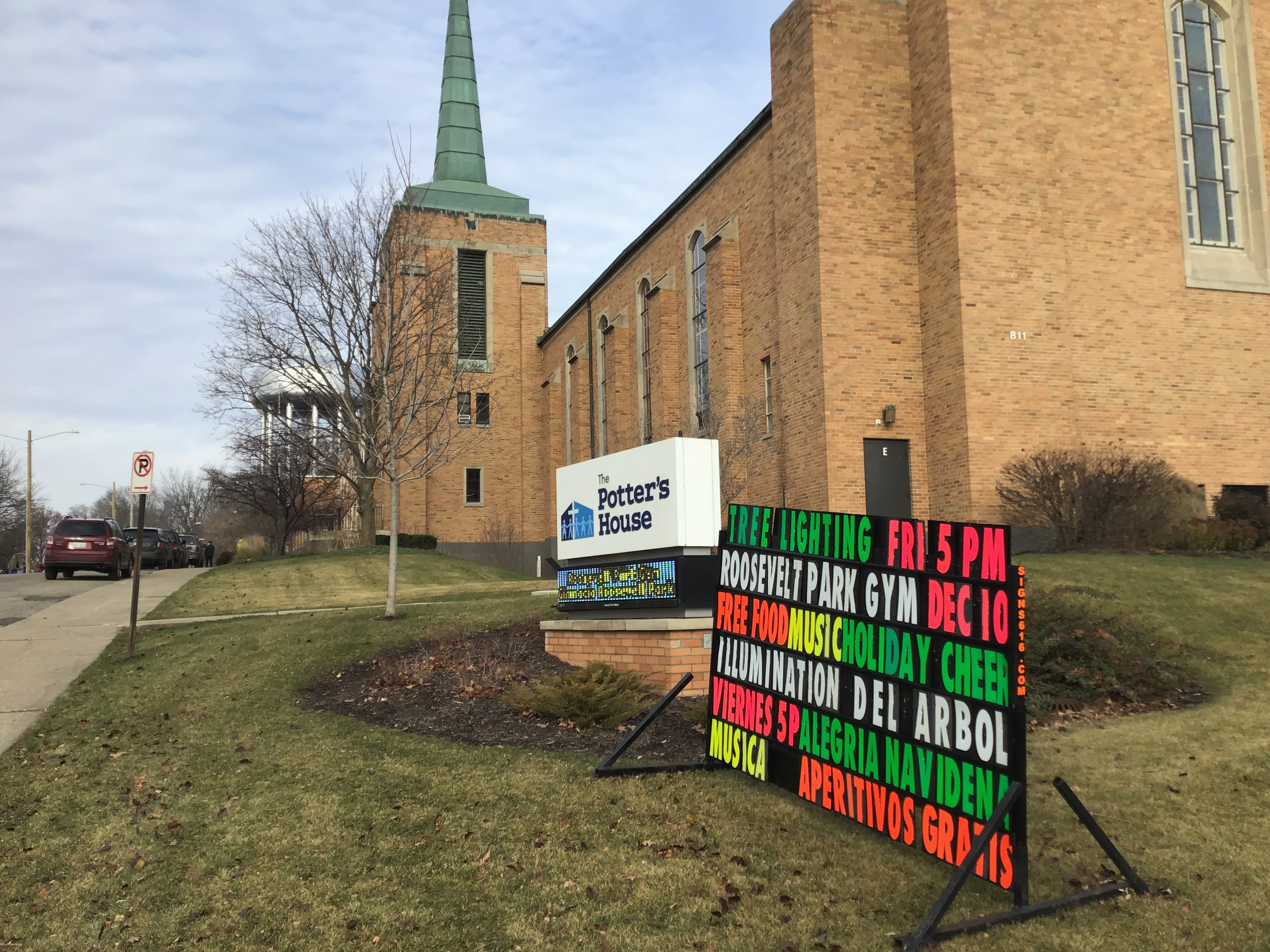

The Potter's House is a K-12 private Christian school in Michigan. The elementary and middle school campus is in Grand Rapids and the high school campus is in Wyoming. As of 2017 the superintendent is John Booy.

U.S. Secretary of Education Betsy DeVos and Dick DeVos funded its technological features, and Emily DeRuy wrote in The Atlantic that the couple "have contributed hundreds of thousands of dollars and countless volunteer hours."

== Demographics ==
As of 2017 the institution had a total has 560 students with origins from 37 countries, and about 200 of them were in the high school. 30% of the total enrolled students in the system have command of the Spanish language. As of 2017 over 200 students are on a waiting list to get in.

== Operations ==
The school has a creed that parents and teachers are required to agree to. Booy states that the involvement from these two groups are crucial to the school's success.
