= Kelloggsville Public Schools =

School district in Michigan

Kellogsville Public Schools Schools

Address
- 242 52nd Street SE Grand Rapids, Kent County, Michigan, 49548; United States

District information
- Grades: PreKindergarten–12
- Established: 1856
- Superintendent: Jim Alston
- Schools: 6
- Budget: $43,372,000 2022–2023 expenditures
- NCES District ID: 2620160

Students and staff
- Students: 2,211 (2024–2025)
- Teachers: 136.76 (on an FTE basis) (2024–2025)
- Staff: 290.05 FTE (2024–2025)
- Student–teacher ratio: 16.17 (2024–2025)
- District mascot: Rockets
- Colors: Navy and orange

Other information
- Website: www.kvilleps.org

Kelloggsville Public Schools is a public school district in the Grand Rapids, Michigan area. It serves parts of Kentwood and Wyoming.

== History ==
The district was established in 1856, and the first school was built in 1859. A new high school was built in fall 1936, funded by the Works Progress Administration. The first class graduated from that building in 1938. The current middle school opened in fall 1994, and it housed seventh and eighth graders who had attended the high school and sixth graders who had attended elementary schools.

Kelloggsville High School was renovated and expanded in 2016. Central Kelloggsville Elementary opened in October 2021. Its skylit rotunda was meant to evoke a rocket silo. The architect was TowerPinkster.

== Schools ==
Schools in Kelloggsville Public Schools district
School	Address	Notes
Kelloggsville High School	4787 Division Avenue South, Grand Rapids	Grades 9-12
Kelloggsville Middle School	4650 Division Avenue South, Grand Rapids	Grades 6-8
Central Kelloggsville Elementary	4625 Jefferson Ave SE, Grand Rapids	Grades 3-5
West Kelloggsville Elementary	4555 Magnolia SW, Grand Rapids	Grades PreK-2
Southeast Kelloggsville Elementary	240 52nd Street SE, Grand Rapids	Grades PreK-2
Kelloggsville Early Childhood Learning Center	977 44th Street SW, Grand Rapids	Preschool
54th Street Academy	173 54th Street SW, Grand Rapids	Alternative high school
