= University of Michigan Health - West =

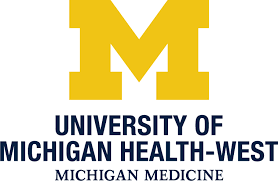

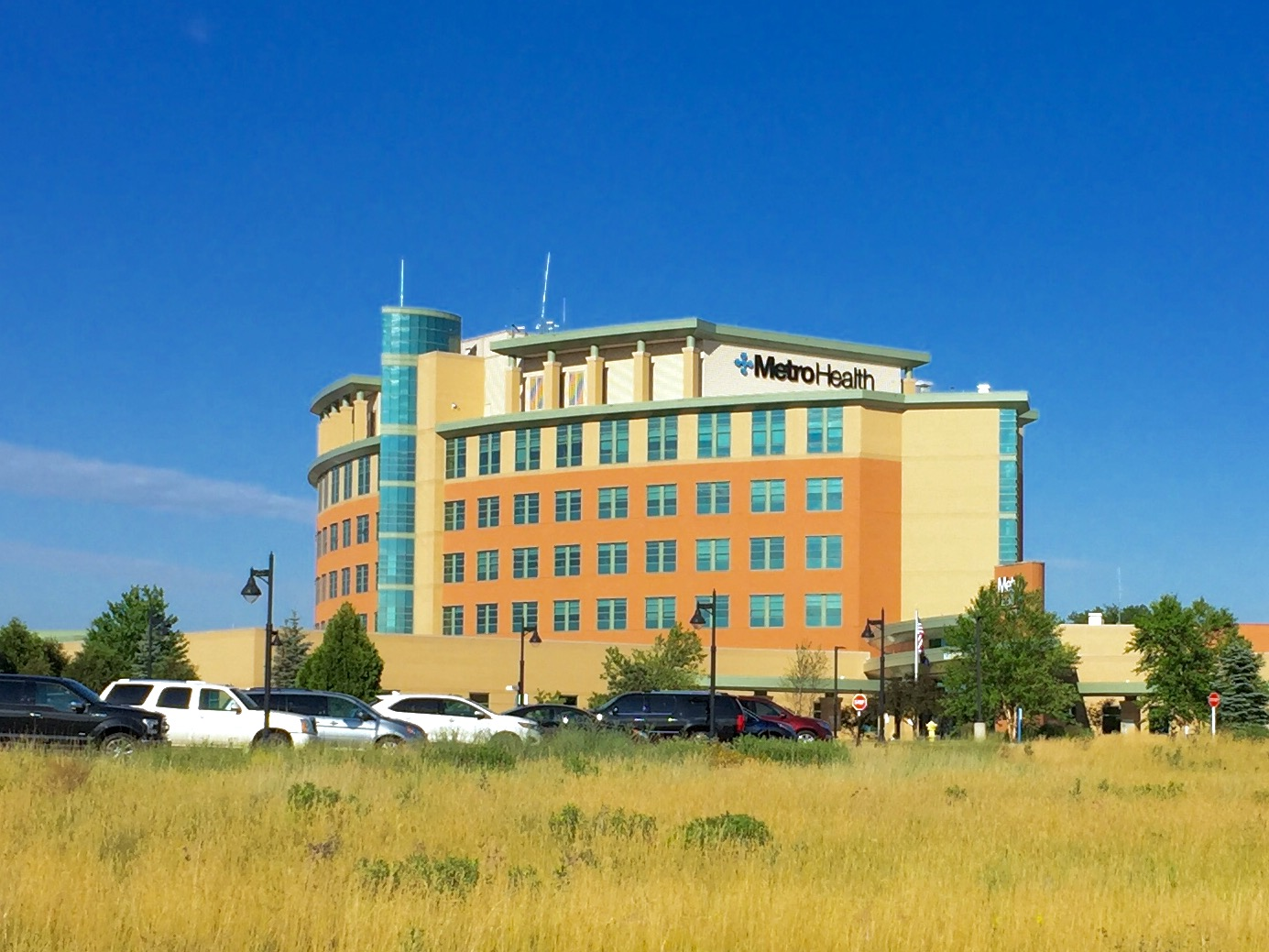

Geography
- Location: 5900 Byron Center Ave, Wyoming, Michigan, United States
- Coordinates: 42°51′27″N 85°43′05″W

Organization
- Affiliated university: University of Michigan Health System

Services
- Emergency department: Level II trauma center
- Beds: 208

History
- Founded: December 1942; 83 years ago

Links
- Website: uofmhealthwest.org
- Lists: Hospitals in Michigan

University of Michigan Health - West, formerly known as Metro Health – University of Michigan Health, is a nonprofit health system affiliated with the University of Michigan Health, with primary and specialty care services at 30 locations in West Michigan.

The organization’s 208-bed main hospital is located in Metro Health Village in Wyoming, Michigan, and serves more than 250,000 patients annually. It is one of the only hospitals in the area that is not located in or near the Grand Rapids Medical Mile.

== History ==
=== Founding ===
In the 1940s, Louis M. Monger, an osteopathic physician who had been working at the Detroit Osteopathic Hospital, intended to introduce osteopathic care to the residents of Grand Rapids, Michigan. Monger and a group of osteopathic physicians decided to set aside their personal resources to create a hospital dedicated to holistic care. It was decided to purchase the previous home of the bishop serving for the Diocese of Grand Rapids at 1225 Lake Drive in Grand Rapids, Michigan and nearly $50,000 was raised to equip the hospital. After some delays due to rationing during World War II, Grand Rapids Osteopathic Hospital opened in December 1942 to commemorate the 50th anniversary of Andrew Taylor Still's creation of osteopathic education.

The hospital's first patient was Louisa Porcelli, wife of the hospital's Secretary-Treasurer James V. Porcelli, DO, who gave birth to their first child in the nearly finished hospital. Louisa had to be carried up the stairs and placed in the only functioning room in the hospital.

=== Metropolitan Hospital ===
In 1957, the Grand Rapids Osteopathic Hospital relocated to 1919 Boston SE Grand Rapids, MI. The hospital was originally equipped with only 28 beds. By the late 1970s, the hospital had grown to include over 200 beds. After decades of growth, the hospital was renamed Metropolitan Hospital so it could represent the multiple specialties now working with patients.

By the 1990s, Metropolitan Hospital was seeking to expand. On December 2, 1996, the hospital's president and CEO Michael Faas unveiled a new organization called Metro Health, with the hospital partnered with over 130 physicians to create clinics throughout western Michigan. In May 1999, a $40 million proposal to expand, that included the purchase and destruction of 55 homes in the area, was opposed by residents in the area. By October 2000, Spectrum Health was expanding throughout the area while the hospital still lacked neighborhood support, resulting in a decision to construct a new facility elsewhere.

=== Metro Health ===
Metro Health logo used from 2005 to 2016.

On March 12, 2001, it was announced that the hospital was attempting to purchase 150 acres in Wyoming, MI to create a "health care village." The decision was made after years of remaining landlocked on its 17-acre property in Grand Rapids with residents denying expansion. The site was located near three major freeways; M-6, U.S. 131 and I-196, situated among the growing suburban area outside of Grand Rapids. It was chosen after studying population growth patterns and because of its size, which would allow the hospital to make multiple expansions.

In 2009, the University of Michigan Health System and the Metro Health Cancer Center initially began a partnership for cancer treatment. Over time, clinical relationships began to develop between the two entities.

=== Metro Health – University of Michigan Health ===
On December 15, 2016, Metro Health officially announced its affiliation with the University of Michigan Health System and was renamed Metro Health – University of Michigan Health. The University of Michigan Health System has some of the most advanced resources and expertise in the United States, patients are able to receive more specialized treatment at the hospital.

In 2019, the organization announced the formation of the Cancer Network of West Michigan, a joint venture with Mercy Health Muskegon, Mercy Health St. Mary’s in Grand Rapids, and Michigan Medicine. The network is designed to give patients broader access to advanced, comprehensive diagnosis, treatment and support across healthcare institutions.

In 2021, a similar joint venture with Mercy Health was announced for cardiovascular care: The Cardiovascular Network of West Michigan. As part of this collaboration, Metro Health – University of Michigan Health gained approval to launch an open-heart surgery program at its Wyoming campus.

=== University of Michigan Health-West ===
On June 8, 2021, the organization’s board of directors approved plans to rename as University of Michigan Health-West. The name became official on September 27, 2021. The announcement of the change indicated two purposes: To describe the organization’s role within University of Michigan Health and to emphasize its focus on West Michigan.

== Services ==
Metro Health Hospital consists of child-birth services, neurosciences, medical care, surgical care, intensive care, and diagnostic/imaging services units. Its specialty services include cardiac care, stroke center, joint replacement, neurosurgery, assisted breathing center, sports medicine and wound care. The health system is also the first healthcare center in West Michigan to offer minimally invasive robotic surgery using the Da Vinci Surgical System in the outpatient setting, and also has an emergency department certified as a level II trauma center.

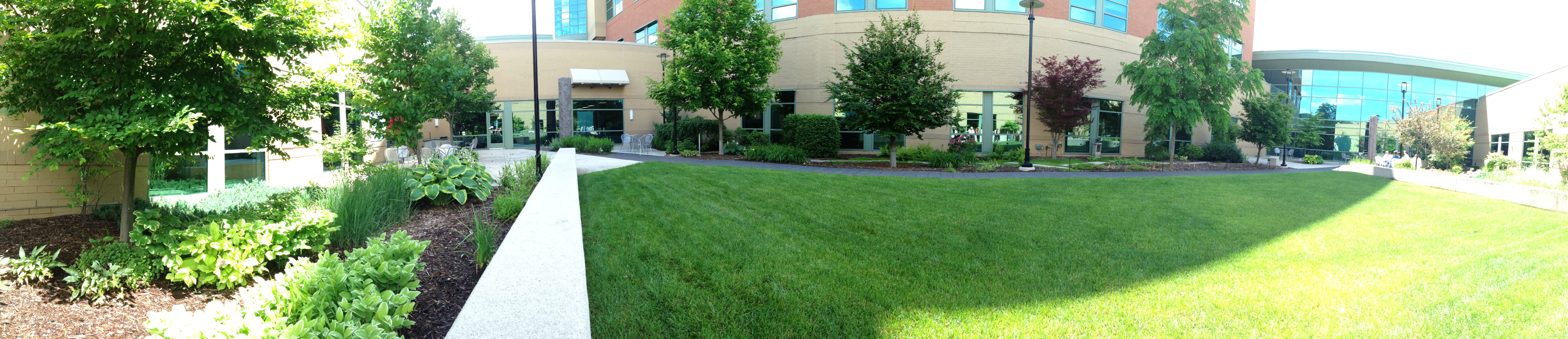
Panorama of Bill & Bea Idema Healing Garden at Metro Health Hospital

== See also ==
- Grand Rapids Medical Mile
- Hospitals in Michigan
