= Lorraine (automobile) =

Defunct American motor vehicle manufacturer

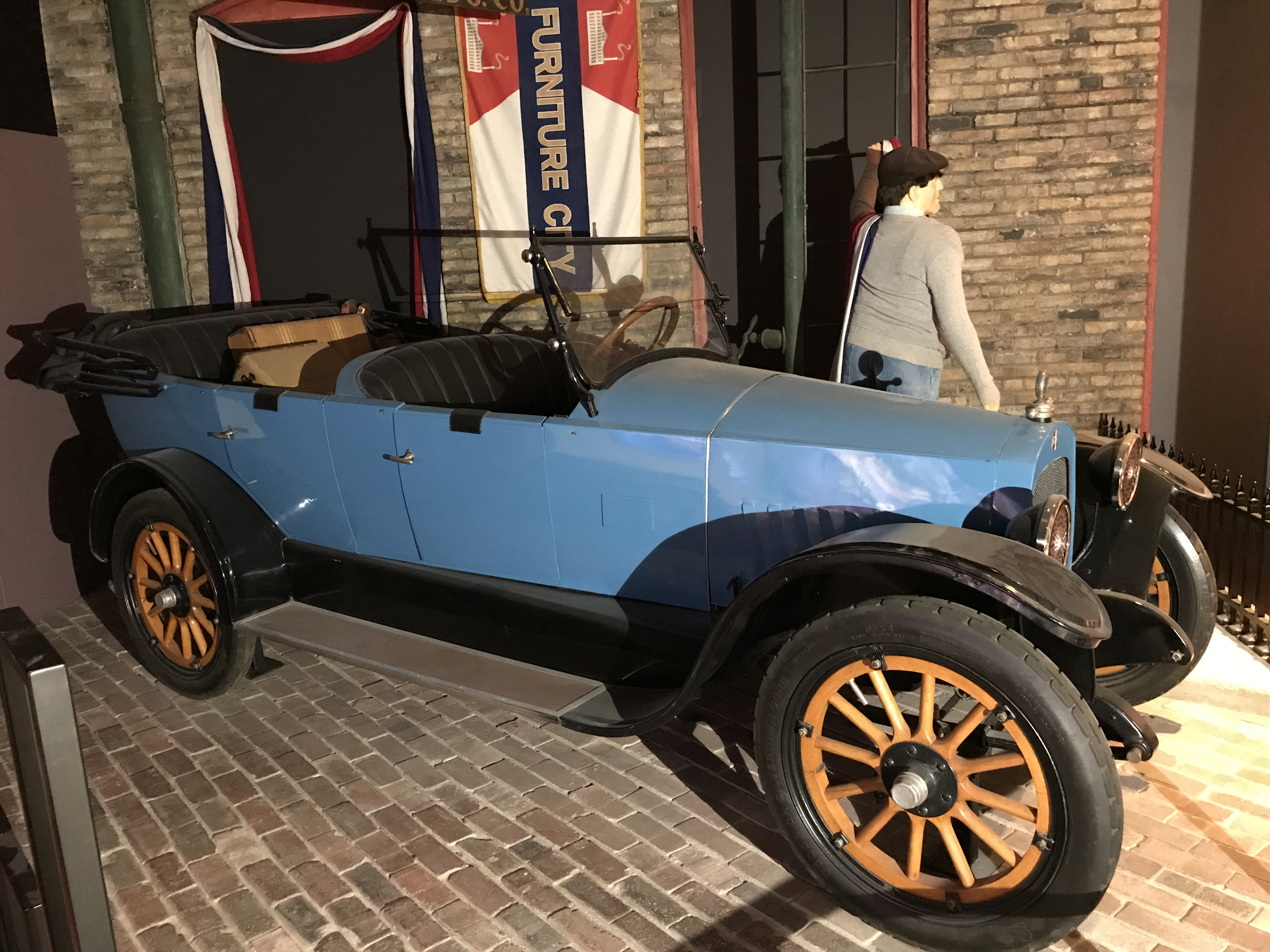
- 1920 Lorraine Model 20-T Tourer

Overview
- Type: Automobile
- Manufacturer: Lorraine Motors Corporation
- Production: 1920–1922
- Assembly: Grand Rapids, Michigan

Body and chassis
- Body style: Touring, Sedan, Roadster

Powertrain
- Engine: Herschell-Spillman 4-cylinder
- Power output: 35 hp

Dimensions
- Wheelbase: 114"

The Lorraine was an automobile built in Grand Rapids, Michigan, by the Lorraine Motors Corporation from 1920 to 1922.

== History ==
The Lorraine was an assembled car that succeeded the Hackett. The vehicle was powered by a four-cylinder Herchell-Spillman engine and was available in both open and closed models. Only a few hundred cars were sold. The production in 1920 was 300 vehicles.

Prices ranged from $1,695 to $2,590, (equivalent to $49,818 in 2025). Plans for David Dunbar Buick to build a larger Lorraine with an IOE engine did not go past the prototype stage before the company declared bankruptcy.
