= Hackett (automobile) =

American car made from 1916 to 1919

Hackett Motor Car Co.
- Company type: Automobile Manufacturing
- Industry: Automotive
- Founded: 1917
- Founder: Mansell Hackett
- Defunct: 1919
- Fate: sold and closed
- Headquarters: Jackson, Michigan, Grand Rapids, Michigan, United States
- Area served: United States
- Key people: Mansell Hackett, Fred M. Guy, Otto W. Heinz
- Products: Vehicles; Automotive parts

The Hackett was an automobile built in Jackson, Michigan, United States, by the Hackett Motor Car Company from 1916 to 1919.

== History ==
Englishman Mansell Hackett had founded the Disco Starter Co. in Detroit. As an ancillary business, he bought small, near-defunct American automobile manufacturers, and either split them up and sold the parts, or refurbished them as a whole. One of these companies was the Argo Motor Co owned by Benjamin Briscoe. Mansell decided to keep this enterprise, and become a car manufacturer himself. So, it was reorganized as the Hackett Motor Car Co. Some financing came from a ship building family in Ferrisburg, which resulted in J.S. Johnston becoming president of the company, and Hackett its general manager.

The Hackett was an assembled car, powered by a four-cylinder, side-valve G.B.&S. engine with a Carter carburetor, and a displacement of 178.8 c.i. (3078 cm³). It delivered 22.5 bhp (16.8 kW). The car had a conventional frame with a wheelbase of 112 inches (2,800 mm), and was quite obviously patterned after the Ford Model T.

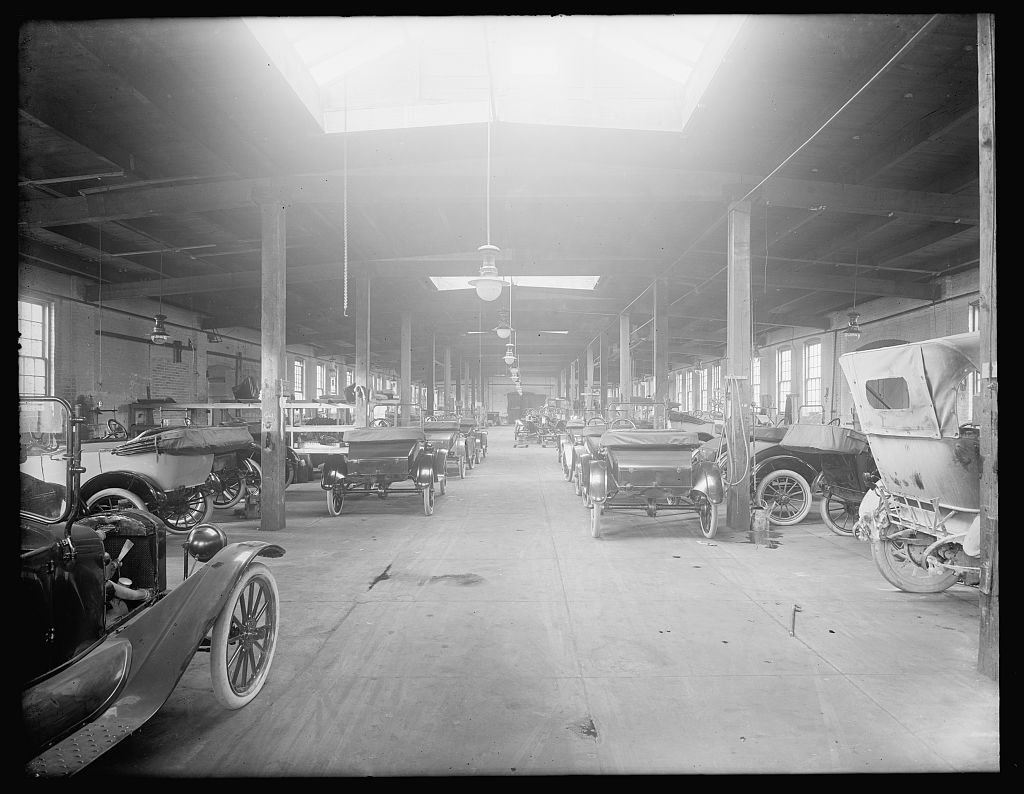

At first, the Hackett was offered as a 5-passenger touring car and a 4-passenger roadster, each priced at $888. In 1918, the latter was replaced by 2- and 3-passenger variants, and a 5-passenger "All Seasons Touring", which meant either a touring car fitted with a removable "winter" or "California" top (as period Dodge cars were offered¨with), or a fixed roof with removable side panels and windows for summer use.

Following a forced production interrupt due to war material shortages, operations were transferred to Grand Rapids, Michigan.

Chief engineer Fred M. Guy worked since 1910 on a "valveless" engine with rotating, gear driven discs, thus eliminating camshaft and valve springs. He and Otto W. Heinz had a four-cylinder prototype working in 1919, when the company was closed after another, ill-fated reorganization. Mansell returned to his earlier business of manufacturing starters, and Guy and Heinz went to Ypsilanti, Michigan where they joined forces with Apex Motor Corp., builder of the Ace car. Here, the Guy engine was reworked into a six-cylinder power plant, and saw limited production. Later, it led to the founding of the Guy Disc Valve Motor Co. in Ypsilanti.

The premises in Grand Rapids were sold to the Lorraine Motors Corp., were a Herschell-Spillman powered, medium-sized car was built initially. Plans of David Dunbar Buick of building a larger Lorraine with an engine developed by him, using the IOE principle incorporated in the very first Buick did not materialize.

In total, there were only about 118 Hackett cars built.

== Literature ==
- G.N. Georgano (1968). The Complete Encyclopedia of Motorcars, 1885 to Present.
- Kimes, Beverly Rae (1996). The Standard Catalog of American Cars: 1805-1942. Iola, IA: Krause Publications. p. 1612. ISBN 0873414284.
