= Allendale, Michigan =

- Census-designated place (CDP) & unincorporated community
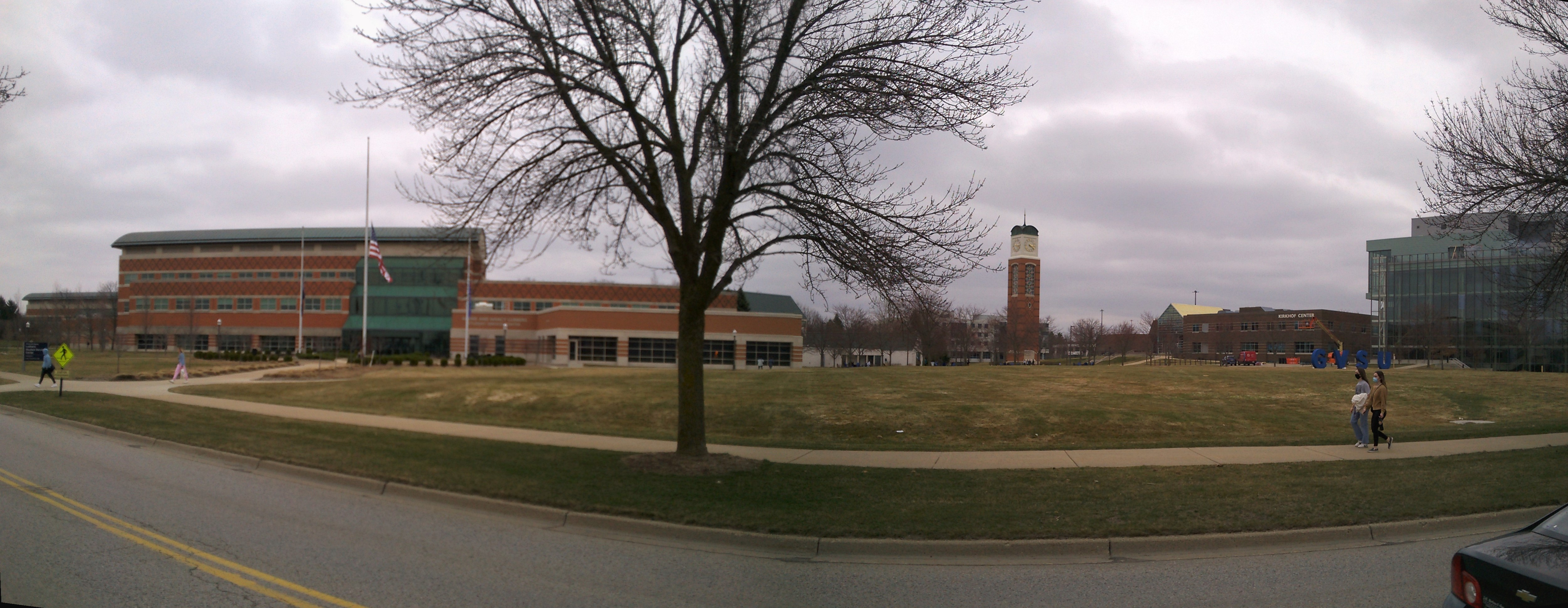
- Grand Valley State University main campus

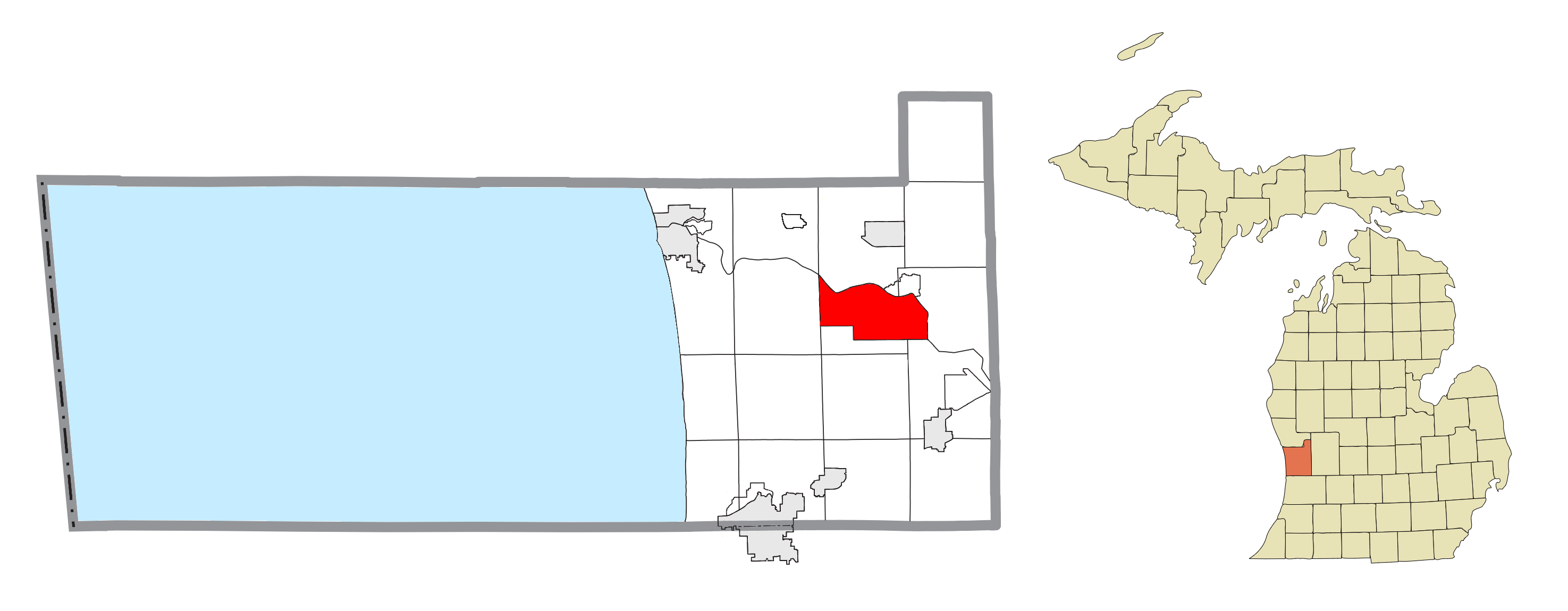
- Location within Ottawa County

- Location within the state of Michigan Location within the United States
- Coordinates: 42°58′20″N 85°57′13″W
- Country: United States
- State: Michigan
- County: Ottawa
- Township: Allendale

Area
  - Total: 24.15 sq mi (62.54 km^{2})
  - Land: 23.24 sq mi (60.18 km^{2})
  - Water: 0.91 sq mi (2.36 km^{2})
- Elevation: 653 ft (199 m)

Population (2020)
  - Total: 27,073
  - Density: 1,165/sq mi (449.9/km^{2})
- Time zone: UTC-5 (Eastern (EST))
  - Summer (DST): UTC-4 (EDT)
- ZIP Code: 49401
- Area code: 616
- FIPS code: 26-01340
- GNIS feature ID: 1626370

Allendale is a census-designated place (CDP) in Ottawa County in the U.S. state of Michigan. The population was 27,073 at the 2020 census. It is located within Allendale Charter Township, occupying approximately the northern two-thirds of the township, from the eastern boundary with the Grand River west along Pierce St., north along 75th Ave., then west along Lake Michigan Drive (M-45) to the western boundary of the township. It is a part of the Grand Rapids-Muskegon-Holland, Michigan combined statistical area, and is an exurb of Grand Rapids, due to its major commuter routes into the city (M-45 and I-96).

The CDP's ZIP code 49401 serves most of the township, as well as portions of Blendon Township to the south and Georgetown Township to the southeast.

Allendale is named for the township. The township was organized in 1849, state senator Pennoyer changed the name to Allendale, after Agnes Allen, the first person on the tax roll in the area and the widow of Hannibal Allen, who was the son of Revolutionary War hero Ethan Allen.

Allendale is home to the main campus of Grand Valley State University.

== Geographical area ==
According to the United States Census Bureau, the CDP has a total area of 24.1 square miles (62.4 km^{2}), of which 23.2 square miles (60.1 km^{2}) is land and 0.9 square miles (2.3 km^{2}) (3.78%) is water.

=== Geographic features ===
- Grand River (Michigan)

== Demographics ==
Historical population
Census	Pop.	Note	%±
2010	17,579		—
2020	27,073		54.0%
U.S. Decennial Census

=== 2020 census ===
As of the 2020 census, Allendale had a population of 27,073. The median age was 21.3 years. 15.3% of residents were under the age of 18 and 4.9% of residents were 65 years of age or older. For every 100 females there were 82.7 males, and for every 100 females age 18 and over there were 80.3 males age 18 and over.

89.1% of residents lived in urban areas, while 10.9% lived in rural areas.

There were 8,115 households in Allendale, of which 24.7% had children under the age of 18 living in them. Of all households, 34.1% were married-couple households, 26.1% were households with a male householder and no spouse or partner present, and 34.3% were households with a female householder and no spouse or partner present. About 24.0% of all households were made up of individuals and 3.0% had someone living alone who was 65 years of age or older.

There were 8,624 housing units, of which 5.9% were vacant. The homeowner vacancy rate was 1.1% and the rental vacancy rate was 6.0%.

Racial composition as of the 2020 census
Race	Number	Percent
White	23,148	85.5%
Black or African American	1,268	4.7%
American Indian and Alaska Native	128	0.5%
Asian	458	1.7%
Native Hawaiian and Other Pacific Islander	3	0.0%
Some other race	713	2.6%
Two or more races	1,355	5.0%
Hispanic or Latino (of any race)	1,807	6.7%

=== 2000 census ===
As of the census of 2000, there were 11,555 people, 2,864 households, and 1,913 families residing in the CDP. The population density was 506.1 inhabitants per square mile (195.4/km^{2}). There were 3,016 housing units at an average density of 132.1 per square mile (51.0/km^{2}). The racial makeup of the CDP was 93.22% White, 2.97% African American, 0.34% Native American, 0.89% Asian, 0.08% Pacific Islander, 1.45% from other races, and 1.06% from two or more races. Hispanic or Latino of any race were 3.03% of the population.

There were 2,864 households, out of which 38.5% had children under the age of 18 living with them, 57.8% were married couples living together, 6.3% had a female householder with no husband present, and 33.2% were non-families. 16.1% of all households were made up of individuals, and 3.5% had someone living alone who was 65 years of age or older. The average household size was 2.98 and the average family size was 3.36.

In the CDP the population was spread out, with 20.7% under the age of 18, 43.1% from 18 to 24, 22.1% from 25 to 44, 9.6% from 45 to 64, and 4.6% who were 65 years of age or older. The median age was 21 years. For every 100 females, there were 87.3 males. For every 100 females age 18 and over, there were 83.6 males.

The median income for a household in the CDP was $46,675, and the median income for a family was $58,370. Males had a median income of $39,038 versus $25,146 for females. The per capita income for the community was $14,580. About 2.4% of families and 12.5% of the population were below the poverty line, including 2.5% of those under age 18 and 3.6% of those age 65 or over.

== Education ==
=== Primary and secondary schools ===
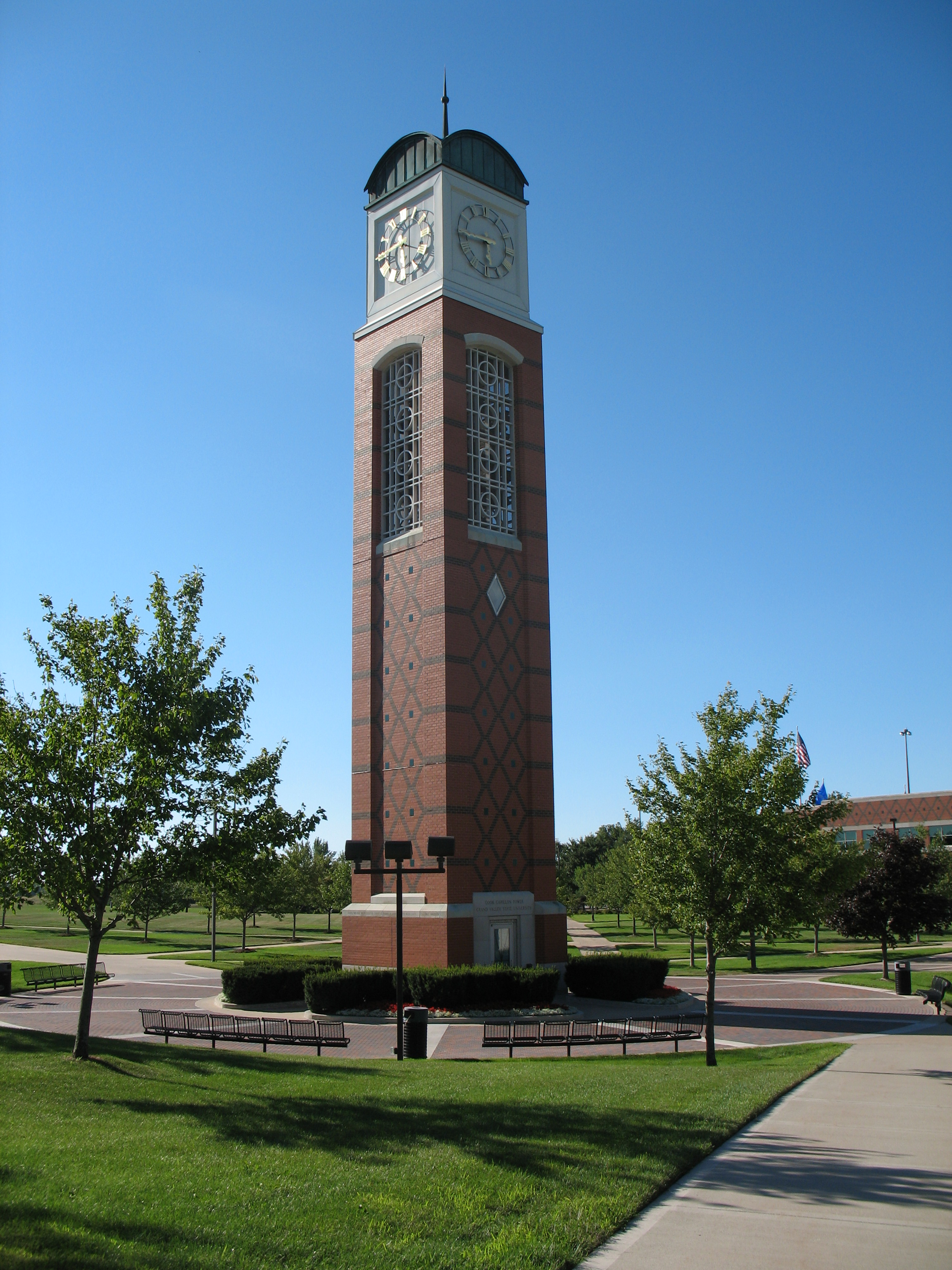
Cook Carillon Tower at Grand Valley State University Allendale campus

- Allendale Public Schools
  - Allendale High School
  - New Options Alternative High School
  - Allendale Middle School
  - Oakwood Intermediate School
  - Evergreen Elementary
- Allendale Christian School
- Grand Riverstone school districts

=== Higher education ===
The main campus of Grand Valley State University, founded in 1960, is located in Allendale on 1,237 acres (5.01 km^{2}). Grand Valley State University is the fastest growing university in the United States, both in population and physical size, as the university is continually building more facilities. The university is also ranked as one of the top up and coming schools in the Midwest. The university enrolls a total of just under 25,000 students on the Allendale campus and two campuses in the surrounding area, and offers over 200 areas of study, making it the largest university in the Grand Rapids region.

== Parks ==
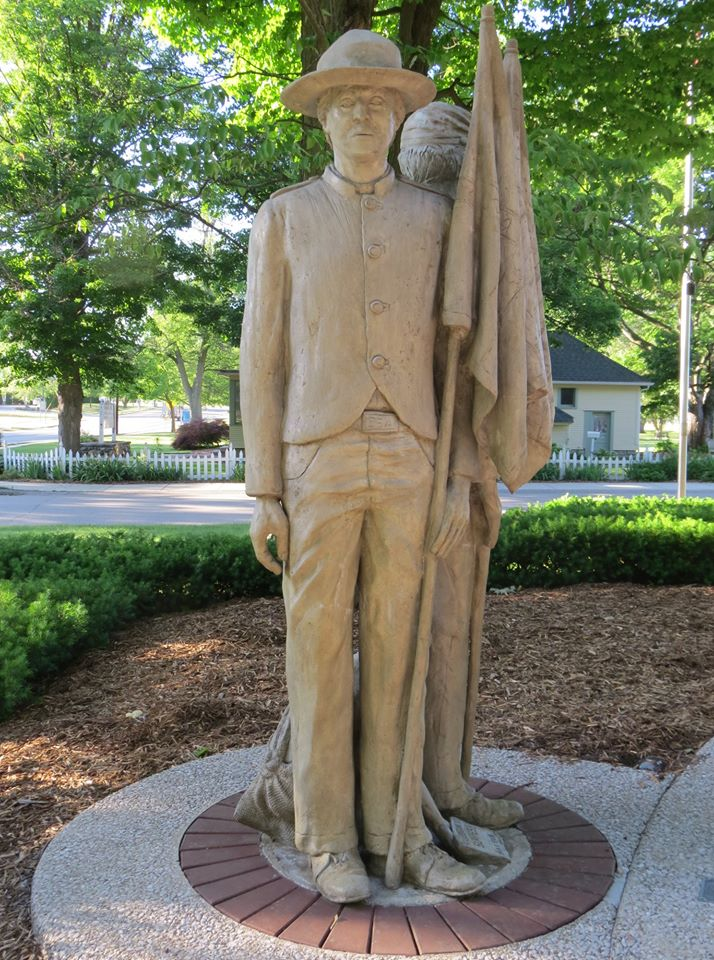

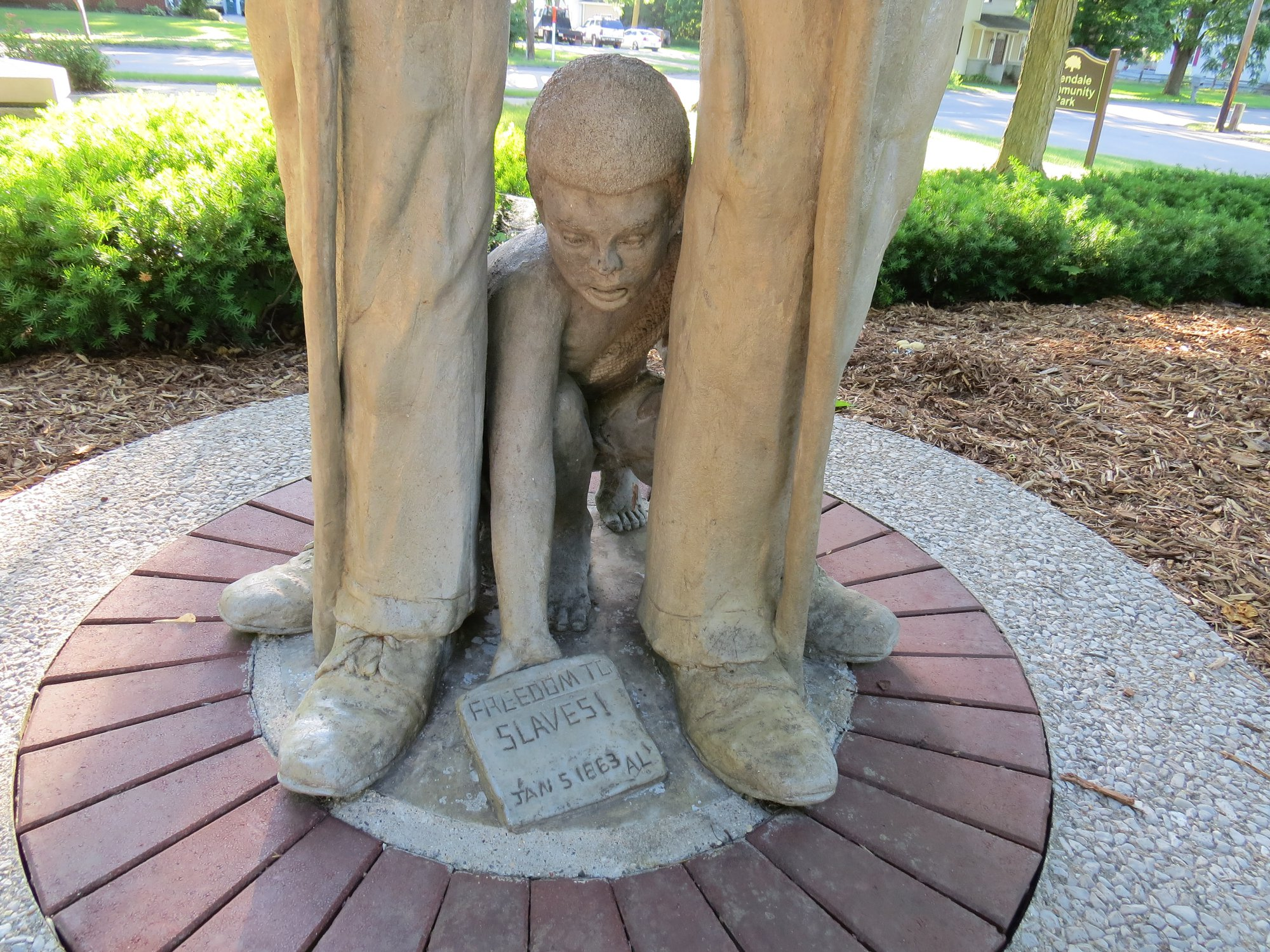

Allendale Community Park is a 40-acre park situated near the township office. It contains a Veterans Garden of Honor honoring U.S. soldiers. It contains nine statues representing veterans of U.S. wars. One of the statues, installed in 1998, depicting a Confederate and Union soldier standing back-to-back with a young slave crouched between them at their feet, has been controversial for seeming to honor the Confederacy. During the George Floyd protests in 2020, the Allendale Township Board voted on June 30, 2020 to keep it.

== Points of interest ==
=== On Campus ===
- Lubbers Stadium, home of Grand Valley State Laker football.
- Cook Carillon Tower
- The Meadows at Grand Valley State University
- GVSU Fieldhouse

=== Off Campus ===
- Grand River
- Bass River State Recreation Area
- Placid Wake Park
- Grand River Park

== Local media ==
=== Newspapers ===
- Grand Valley Lanthorn

=== Radio ===
- WGVU-FM (88.5 FM Allendale/Grand Rapids) – GVSU Public Radio (NPR/Jazz)
- WCKS "The Whale" – GVSU student run radio

=== Television ===
- WGVU-TV – GVSU PBS member station
- GVBN – GVSU student run television station

== Transportation ==
=== Mass transit ===
- The Rapid provides bus service to the Grand Valley State University Allendale campus. The Laker Line connects the Allendale campus to Downtown Grand Rapids, and The Rapid operates additional shuttle services in Allendale, connecting to off-campus housing.

=== Major highways ===
- M-45 (Lake Michigan Drive)
