= Charleston, Ottawa County, Michigan =

Former village in Michigan, U.S.

Coordinates: 43°0′14″N 85°56′07″W

Charleston was a settlement in Allendale Township, Ottawa County, Michigan. It began as a trading settlement to exchange goods with the local Native Americans in 1810, constructed by Pierre Constant.

According to the Honorable William M. Ferry, "The first trader who located in what was Ottawa County--then embracing Muskegon county--was Pierre Constant, a Frenchman, of the type that advanced guard of pioneers--Marquette, LaSalle, Joliet, and Tonti--who, two hundred years before, invaded and brought to the world the great Northwest. [Constant] was of the chevalier order of men--brave, honorable, and undaunted, amid all dangers. In 1810, he engaged with the British Fur Company, then having a depot at Mackinaw, as a trader; and with his supply of merchandise coasted along the shore of Lake Michigan, and established a trading post on Grand River, near what is now called Charleston, and another on the banks of Muskegon Lake."

Charleston was platted in 1836. However the sawmill was removed in 1872 and the village ceased to exist.
