= Robert Jackson (safety) =

American football player (born 1958)

No. 37
- Position: Safety

Personal information
- Born: October 21, 1958 (age 68); Allendale, Michigan, U.S.
- Listed height: 5 ft 10 in (1.78 m)
- Listed weight: 184 lb (83 kg)

Career information
- High school: Allendale
- College: Central Michigan
- NFL draft: 1981: 11th round, 285th overall pick

Career history
- Cincinnati Bengals (1982–1987,1989)

Career NFL statistics
- Interceptions: 15
- Fumble recoveries: 7
- Touchdowns: 2
- Stats at Pro Football Reference

Robert Jackson (born October 10, 1958) is an American former professional football player who was a safety in the National Football League (NFL). He was selected 285th overall by the Cincinnati Bengals in the 11th round of the 1981 NFL draft. He played college football for the Central Michigan Chippewas.
