= Kirkhof Center =

Building

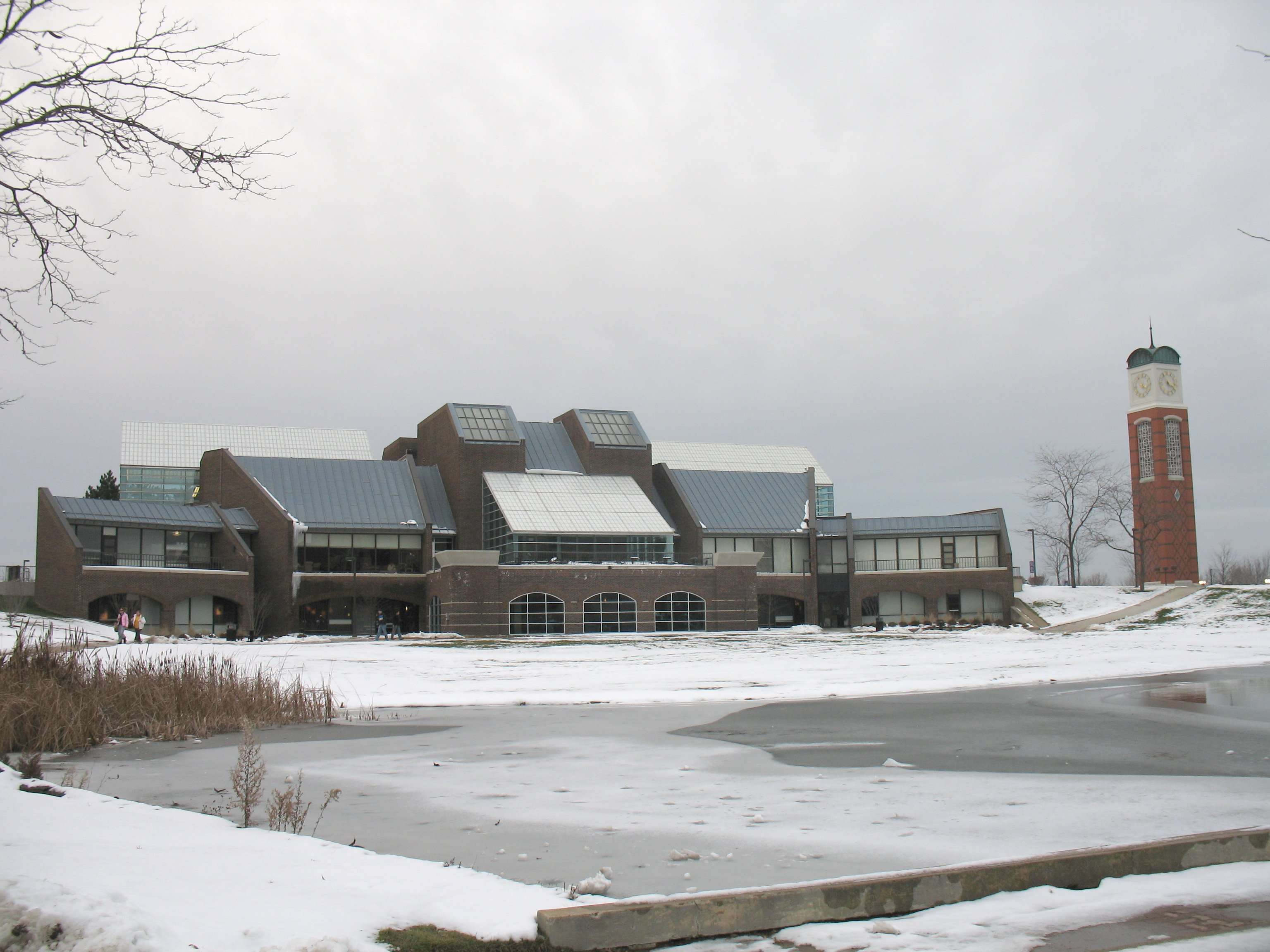
- Kirkhof Center at Grand Valley State University-Allendale campus

General information
- Type: student union
- Location: Center of Allendale campus Grand Valley State University
- Coordinates: 42.962700°N 85.888595°W
- Named for: Russel H. Kirkhof
- Completed: 1974

Website
- Official website

The Russel H. Kirkhof Center is a student union on the main Allendale campus of Grand Valley State University located in Allendale, Michigan. The center, originally called “Campus Center”, was dedicated in 1974 and renamed to its current name in 1984.

The Kirkhof Center is home to many services and shops. Located inside the Kirkhof Center is as follows:

Main Level: The main level contains the 2020 Information Desk, Panda Express, a convenience store/coffee shop, billiards, the LGBT Resource Center, Office of Multicultural Affairs, the Women's Center, and the Office of Student Life.

Second Level: The second level is mostly meeting spaces and conference rooms and is home to the Grand River Room and Pere Marquette Room.

Lower Level: The lower level contains the office of Grand Valley Lanthorn, the WCKS student radio station, and the Grand Valley TV studio. Additionally, it contains the Promotions Office, Area 51, dining rooms, and the Replenish Food Pantry.

== Expansions ==
Since its initial construction, the Kirkhof Center has been expanded several times to meet demand for the growing student population.

- 2001: 50,000 sq. ft. addition.
- 2007: 22,000 sq. ft. addition.

The newest addition to the Kirkhof Center is LEED certified.
