= Allendale Charter Township, Michigan =

Allendale Township, Michigan
- Charter township
- Allendale Charter Township
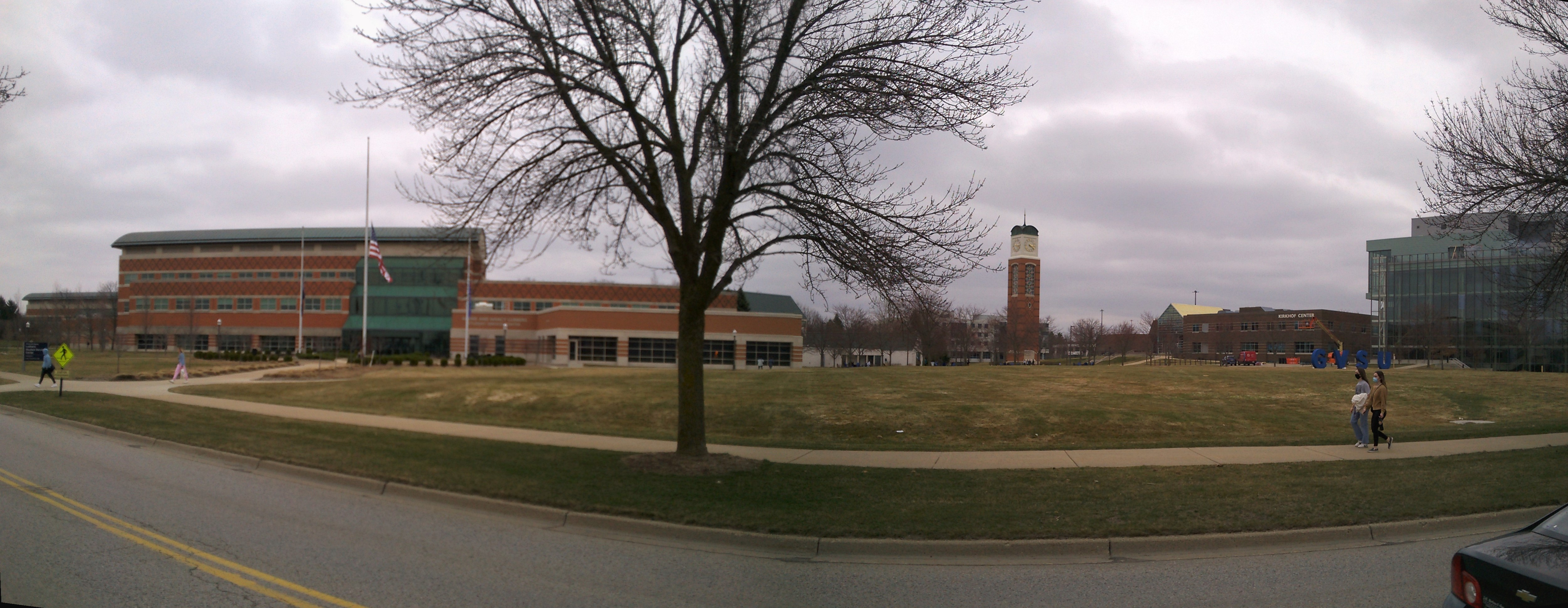
- Grand Valley State University main campus

- Logo

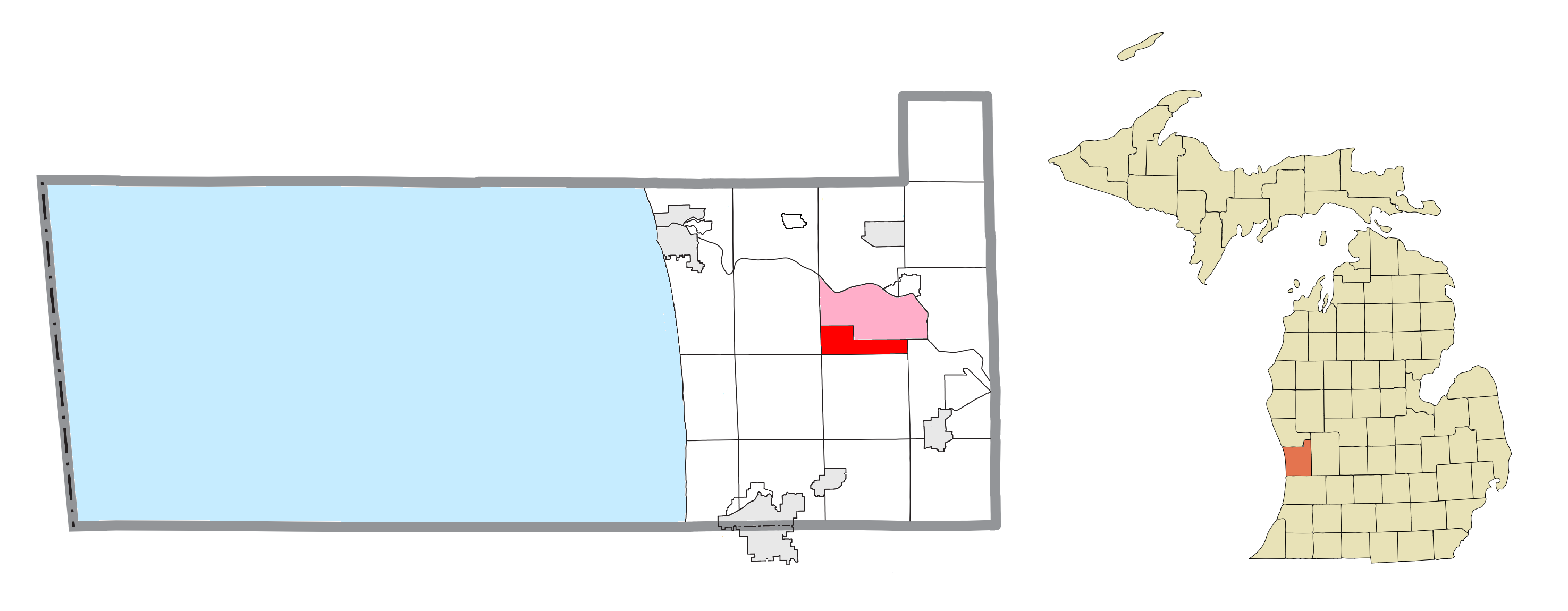
- Location within Ottawa County (red) and the administered CDP of Allendale (pink)

- Location within the state of Michigan Location within the United States
- Coordinates: 42°58′40″N 85°57′31″W
- Country: United States
- State: Michigan
- County: Ottawa
- Established: 1849

Government
  - Supervisor: Adam Elenbaas
  - Clerk: Jody Hansen

Area
  - Total: 32.05 sq mi (83.01 km^{2})
  - Land: 31.13 sq mi (80.63 km^{2})
  - Water: 0.92 sq mi (2.38 km^{2})
- Elevation: 627 ft (191 m)

Population (2020)
  - Total: 26,582
  - Density: 853.9/sq mi (329.7/km^{2})
- Time zone: UTC-5 (Eastern (EST))
  - Summer (DST): UTC-4 (EDT)
- ZIP code(s): 49401 (Allendale); 49426 (Hudsonville); 49428 (Jenison)
- Area code: 616
- FIPS code: 26-01360
- GNIS feature ID: 1625822
- Website: Official website

Allendale Charter Township is a charter township of Ottawa County in the U.S. state of Michigan. At the 2020 Census, the township population was 26,582. Allendale Charter Township is best known as being home to the main campus of Grand Valley State University.

Allendale is located in the center of Ottawa County, bordered by Tallmadge Township, Polkton Township, Robinson Township, Blendon Township and Georgetown Township.

== History ==
The land within the current borders of the township has been inhabited by humans since at least ca. 200 BCE to 500 CE, earliest evidence suggests occupation by Goodall focus, a Middle Woodland Hopewellian culture. At the time of European contact, Anishinaabe-speaking peoples, the Odawa and the Potawatomi lived within the current township.

The first documented European in what is now Allendale was Pierre Constant, a French fur trader who established a trading post at Charleston for John Jacob Astor's American Fur Company in 1810. The first permanent European settler was Richard Roberts, of Wales, who purchased one hundred and sixty acres along the Grand River, building a log cabin in 1842 that became known as the Half-way House, as it was situated roughly halfway between Grand Haven and Grandville. Roberts established a sawmill, a blacksmith shop, a wheelwright and a store.

In the winter of 1848–49, a meeting was held at the home of Alexander Milne for the purpose of drafting a petition requesting to become an organized Township, to be called the Township of Isaac. Those attending the meeting, along with Milne, were James Scott, Johnson Balcom, Alexander Scott, Robert Scott, John Hanna and Henry M. Reed. James Scott drew up the township petition which was signed by all of them. The petition was presented to the state legislature by state Senator Henry Pennoyer of Grand Haven. Senator Pennoyer, on his own initiative, substituted Isaac with the (misspelled) Allandale after Agnes Allen, the first name appearing on the tax roll, and the widow of Hannibal Allen, son of Revolutionary War hero Ethan Allen. The spelling was subsequently changed from Allandale to the current Allendale.

In 1854 the township of Blendon was organized, and set off from Allendale.

The area remained mostly rural for much of the 20th century. For example, Allendale Public Schools remained a K-8 district as late as 1969.

== Communities ==
There are no incorporated municipalities within the township.

- Allendale is a census-designated place consisting of the northern two-thirds of the township and the Allendale ZIP code 49401 serves most of the township except for small areas along the southern boundary.
- Conger was the name of a rural post office in the township from 1899 until 1907.
- Hudsonville is to the southeast, and the Hudsonville ZIP code serves a small area on the central part of the southern boundary of Allendale Township.
- Jenison is to the southeast, and the Jenison ZIP code 49428 serves a small area in the southeast corner of the Allendale Township.
- Pearline, also known as East Allendale, is an unincorporated community about one mile east of Allendale on M-45/Lake Michigan Dr. at 42°58′20″N 85°55′27″W. Fruit grower Joh W. Everhart was the first postmaster of a rural post office here, which operated from April 29, 1891, until May 31, 1908.

== Geography ==
According to the United States Census Bureau, the township has a total area of 32.2 square miles (83 km^{2}), of which 31.3 square miles (81 km^{2}) is land and 0.9 square miles (2.3 km^{2}) (2.80%) is water.

The Grand River forms the northern and eastern boundaries of the township. Georgetown Township is to the southeast, Blendon Township to the south, Olive Township to the southwest, Robinson Township to the west. Across the Grand River, Crockery Township is to the northwest, Polkton Township to the north, and Tallmadge Township to the east and northeast.

M-45 crosses east–west through the township, and crosses the Grand River in the east. Except for US-31 in Grand Haven; M-45, 68th Avenue just to the north and M-231 to the west are the only roads to cross the Grand River in Ottawa County.

=== Climate ===
Allendale experiences a humid continental climate (Köppen climate classification Dfb), warm to hot summers and cold winters, similar to most of the Midwestern United States. It is often humid in the summer.

Allendale receives 132 inches of measurable precipitation per year, on average 33 inches of rain and 82 inches of snowfall.

There are 162 sunny days per year. The comfort index, based on humidity during the hot months, is a 51 out of 100, where higher is more comfortable. The US average on the comfort index is 44.

Climate data for Allendale, MI
Month	Jan	Feb	Mar	Apr	May	Jun	Jul	Aug	Sep	Oct	Nov	Dec	Year
Mean daily maximum °F (°C)	34 (1)	36 (2)	46 (8)	60 (16)	70 (21)	79 (26)	83 (28)	81 (27)	75 (24)	62 (17)	51 (11)	38 (3)	60 (15)
Mean daily minimum °F (°C)	21 (−6)	22 (−6)	29 (−2)	38 (3)	48 (9)	58 (14)	62 (17)	60 (16)	53 (12)	43 (6)	35 (2)	25 (−4)	41 (5)
Average precipitation inches (mm)	1.95 (50)	1.67 (42)	2.07 (53)	3.54 (90)	3.91 (99)	3.31 (84)	3.05 (77)	2.56 (65)	2.60 (66)	3.54 (90)	2.95 (75)	2.20 (56)	33.35 (847)

== Demographics ==
Historical population
Census	Pop.	Note	%±
1850	168		—
1860	245		45.8%
1870	799		226.1%
1880	1,074		34.4%
1890	1,345		25.2%
1900	1,429		6.2%
1910	1,489		4.2%
1920	1,307		−12.2%
1930	1,325		1.4%
1940	1,377		3.9%
1950	1,663		20.8%
1960	2,238		34.6%
1970	3,554		58.8%
1980	6,080		71.1%
1990	8,022		31.9%
2000	13,042		62.6%
2010	20,708		58.8%
2020	26,582		28.4%
https://www.census.gov/programs-surveys/decennial-census.html

As of the census of 2010, there were 20,708 people, 3,306 households, and 2,294 families residing in the township. The population density was 661.6 inhabitants per square mile (255.4/km^{2}). There were 3,492 housing units at an average density of 111.6 per square mile (43.1/km^{2}). The racial makeup of the township was 93.61% White, 2.68% African American, 0.35% Native American, 0.84% Asian, 0.07% Pacific Islander, 1.43% from other races, and 1.01% from two or more races. Hispanic or Latino residents of any race were 2.88% of the population.

There were 3,306 households, out of which 39.9% had children under the age of 18 living with them, 60.8% were married couples living together, 5.9% had a female householder with no husband present, and 30.6% were non-families. 15.5% of all households were made up of individuals, and 3.4% had someone living alone who was 65 years of age or older. The average household size was 3.03 and the average family size was 3.41.

In the township, 22.3% of the population was under the age of 18, 39.3% was from 18 to 24, 23.2% from 25 to 44, 10.5% from 45 to 64, and 4.7% was 65 years of age or older. The median age was 21 years. For every 100 females, there were 89.3 males. For every 100 females age 18 and over, there were 85.5 males.

The median income for a household in the township was $48,669, and the median income for a family was $58,576. Males had a median income of $40,419 versus $25,188 for females. The per capita income for the township was $15,065. About 2.8% of families and 11.7% of the population were below the poverty line, including 3.9% of those under age 18 and 3.3% of those age 65 or over.

== Education ==
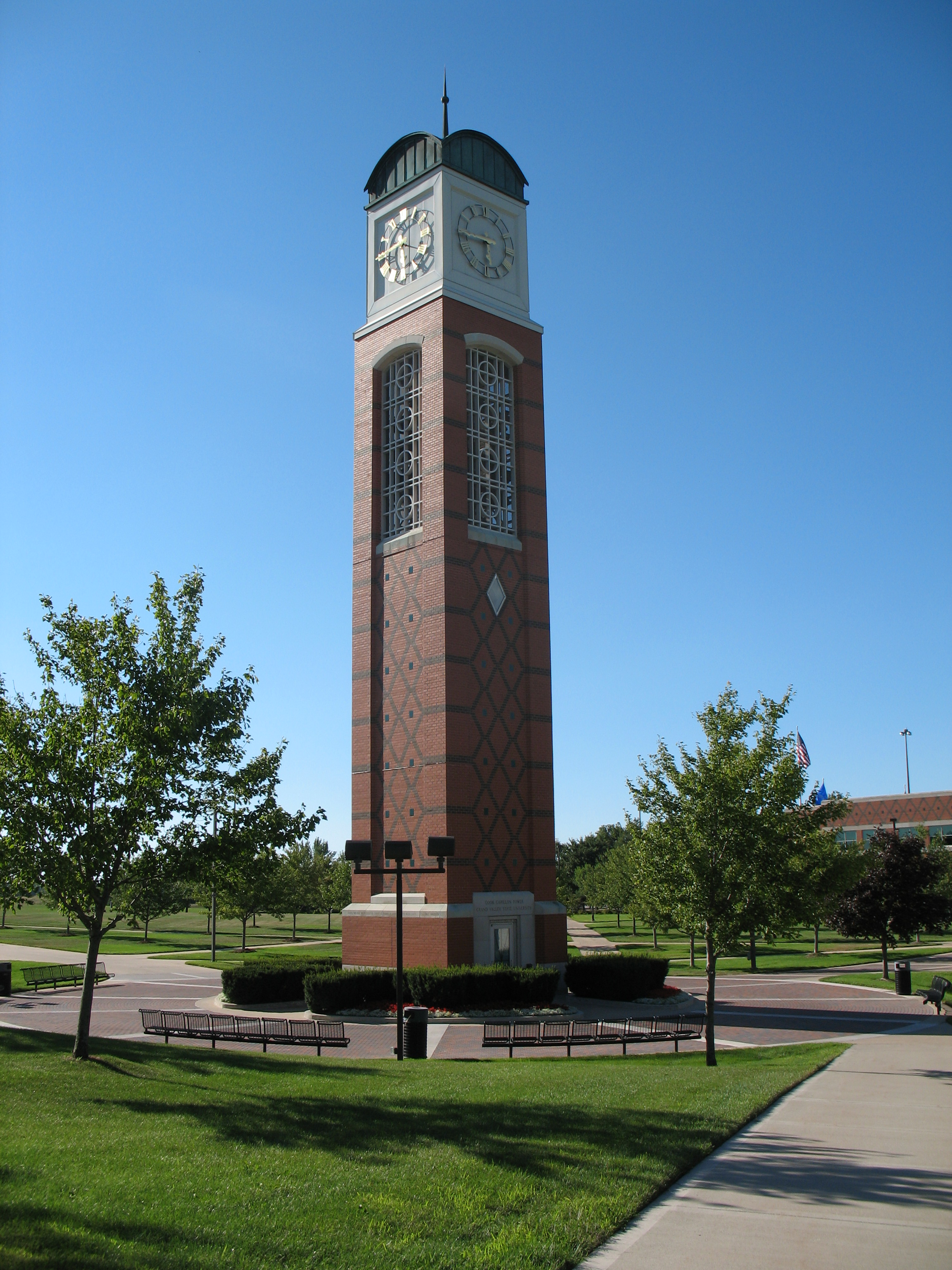
Cook Carillon Tower at Grand Valley State University Allendale campus

=== Primary and secondary schools ===
- Allendale Public Schools
  - Allendale High School
  - New Options Alternative High School
  - Allendale Middle School
  - Oakwood Intermediate School
  - Evergreen Elementary
  - Allendale Early Childhood Center
- Allendale Christian School

=== Higher education ===
The main campus of Grand Valley State University, founded in 1960, is located in Allendale Charter Township on 1,237 acres (5.01 km^{2}). Grand Valley State University is the fastest growing university in the United States, both in population and physical size, as the university is continually building more facilities. The university is also ranked one of the top up and coming schools in the Midwest. The university enrolls a total of just under 25,000 students on the Allendale campus and two campuses in the surrounding area, and offers over 200 areas of study, making it the largest university in the Grand Rapids region.

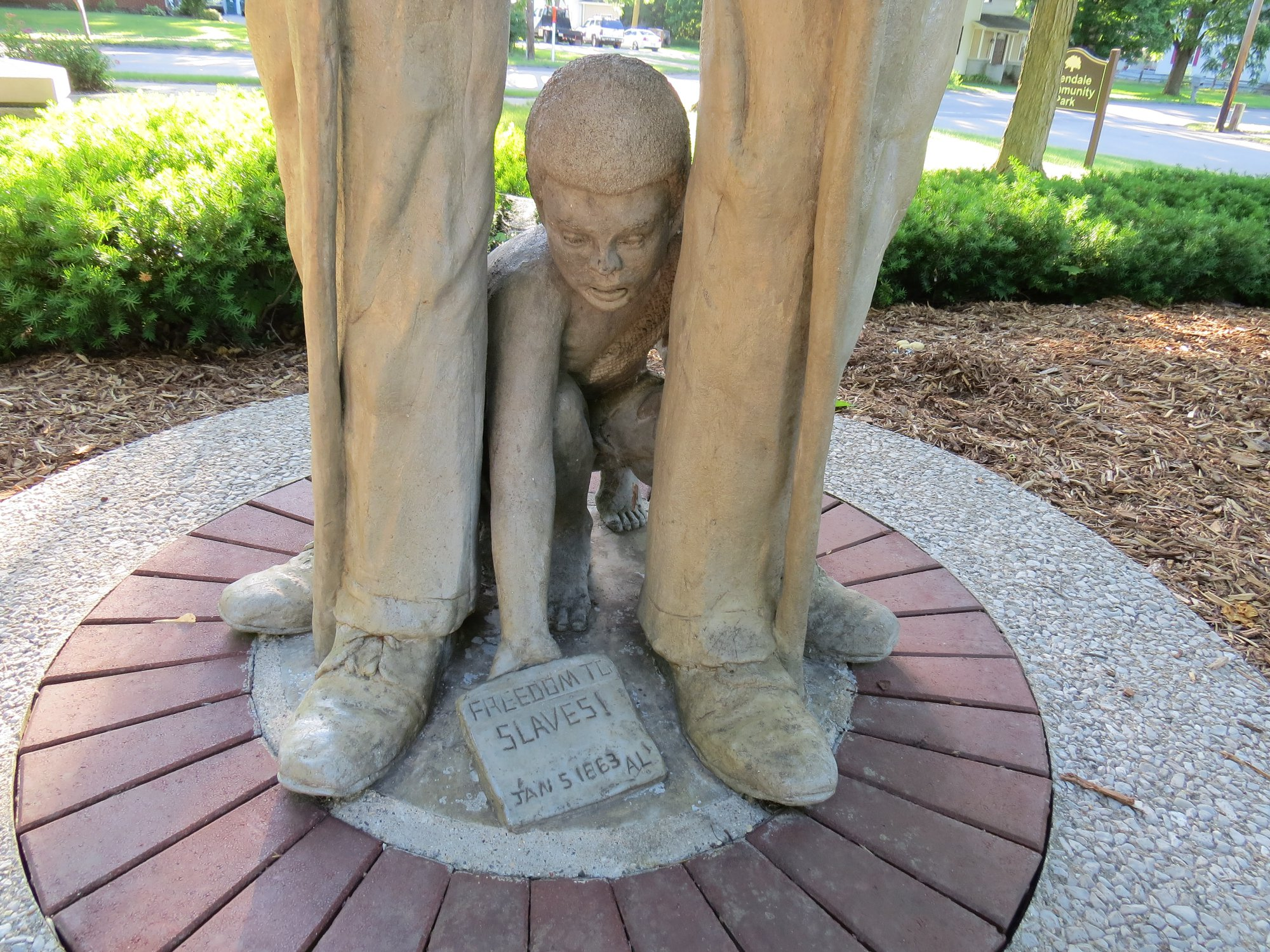

== Parks ==
Allendale Community Park is a 40-acre (16 ha) park situated near the township office. It contains a Veterans Garden of Honor honoring U.S. soldiers. It contains nine statues representing veterans of U.S. wars. One of the statues, installed in 1998, depicting a Confederate and Union soldier standing back-to-back with a young slave crouched between them at their feet, has been controversial for seeming to honor the Confederacy and portraying racial dynamics in a way considered disrespectful to Black people.

During the George Floyd protests in 2020, the civil war statue received heightened scrutiny from local activists. Philomena Mantella, president of Grand Valley State University, suggested that it should be moved and that its presentation should be altered to acknowledge its historical context. The Allendale Township Board voted on June 30, 2020, to keep the statue in the park. Protests on the issue continued through 2021, including the temporary erection of a billboard and multiple acts of vandalism that left the statue disfigured. A contentious second referendum on June 14, 2021, resulted in the statue being retained once again.

== Points of interest ==
=== On campus ===
- Lubbers Stadium, home of Grand Valley State Laker football.
- Cook Carillon Tower
- The Meadows at Grand Valley State University
- GVSU Fieldhouse

=== Off campus ===
- Allendale Township is home to a large number of off campus student housing complexes. As of 2021 there are approximately 8,000 beds according to township assessing records.
- Grand River
- Bass River Recreation Area
- Grand River Park

== Local media ==
=== Newspapers ===
- Grand Valley Advance
- Grand Valley Lanthorn

=== Radio ===
- WGVU-FM (88.5 FM Allendale/Grand Rapids) – GVSU Public Radio (NPR/Jazz)
- WCKS "The Whale" – GVSU student run radio

=== Television ===
- WGVU-TV – GVSU PBS member station
- GVBN – GVSU student run television station

== Transportation ==
=== Mass transit ===
- The Rapid provides bus service to the Grand Valley State University Allendale campus. The Laker Line connects the Allendale campus to Downtown Grand Rapids, and The Rapid operates additional shuttle services in Allendale, connecting to off-campus housing.

=== Major highways ===
- M-45 (Lake Michigan Drive)
