= Allendale Public Schools =

School district in Michigan

Address
- 10505 Learning Lane Allendale, Ottawa, Michigan, 49401; United States

District information
- Grades: Pre-Kindergarten-12
- Superintendent: Dr. Garth Cooper
- Schools: 6
- Budget: $44,418,000 2022-2023 expenditures
- NCES District ID: 2602550

Students and staff
- Students: 2,568 (2024-2025)
- Teachers: 157.98 (on an FTE basis) (2024-2025)
- Staff: 400.75 FTE (2024-2025)
- Student–teacher ratio: 16.26 (2024-2025)

Other information
- Website: www.allendale.k12.mi.us

Allendale Public Schools is a public school district in Ottawa County, Michigan. It serves Allendale and almost all of Allendale Township except a tiny portion in the east zoned to Hudsonville Public Schools.

== History ==
Prior to 1969, Allendale was a K-8 district. High school students were divided between Hudsonville High School, Zeeland High School, and Coopersville High School. In fall 1969, a high school was built as an addition to the elementary/junior high school at 6561 Lake Michigan Drive. That year, the school district had 515 students in grades kindergarten through nine. The current Allendale High School opened in the fall of 1997.

Four district schools share a campus on Learning Lane, the first being Evergreen Elementary, opened in 2004. The name ‘Learning Lane’ was selected by 25 students in a naming contest, and the grand prize winner was then randomly chosen from among them. The 7-year old winner, Savannah Wells, received a $100 savings bond. She told the Grand Rapids Press, "It's a good name for the road since you learn at school."

Evergreen Elementary was joined by Oakwood Intermediate and Allendale Middle School in 2009. Allendale Early Childhood Center was built there in 2019.

== Schools ==
Schools in Allendale Public Schools district
School	Address	Notes
Allendale High School	10760 68th Avenue, Allendale	Grades 9–12. Built 1997.
Allendale Virtual Academy	10760 68th Avenue, Allendale	Grades 9–12. Alternative high school/online learning based at Allendale High School.
Allendale Middle School	7161 Pleasant View Court, Allendale	Grades 6–8. Built 2009.
Oakwood Intermediate	10505 Learning Lane, Allendale	Grades 4–5. Built 2009.
Evergreen Elementary	10690 Learning Lane, Allendale	Grades 1–3. Built 2004.
Allendale Early Childhood Center	10455 Timberline Dr, Allendale	Grades PreK–KG. Built 2019.
