= Laker Line =

Bus service in West Michigan

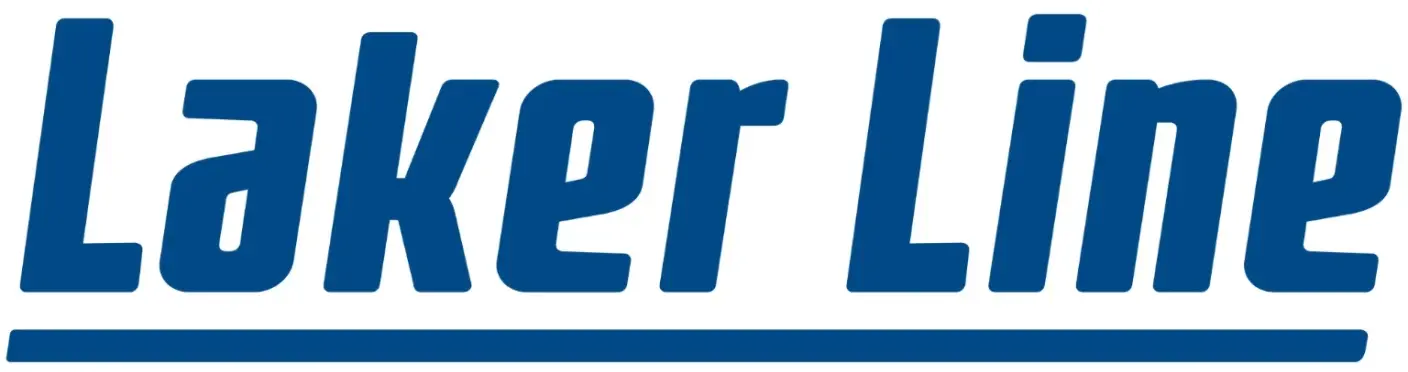

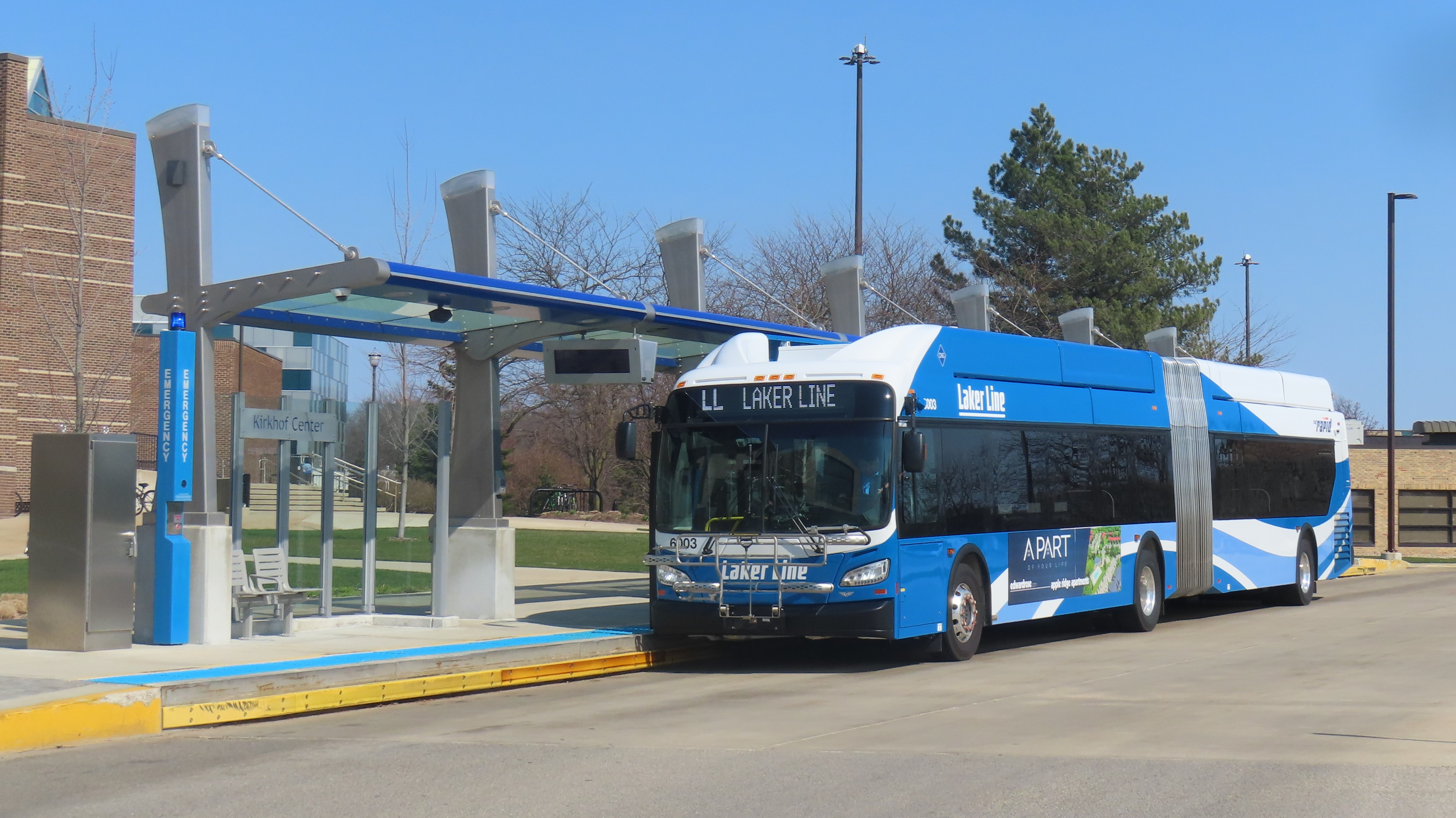
- Laker Line bus at Kirkhof Center station, the route's western terminus

Overview
- Termini: Kirkhof Center; Cook-DeVos Center for Health Sciences
- Connecting lines: Silver Line
- Stations: 13
- Website: www.ridetherapid.org/howtoride/laker-line

Service
- Type: Bus rapid transit
- Operator: The Rapid
- Ridership: 421,150 (with Silver Line)

History
- Opened: August 24, 2020

Technical
- Line length: 13.3 mi (21.4 km)

The Laker Line is a bus service in the Grand Rapids metropolitan area of Michigan, operated by The Rapid. The Laker Line connects three campuses of Grand Valley State University: the main campus in Allendale and two satellite campuses in Downtown Grand Rapids. The service is named after the GVSU athletic teams, and funded primarily by the university. The Laker Line is free to ride for GVSU students and employees, and is open to the general public with the payment of regular The Rapid bus fares.

The Rapid promotes the Laker Line as a bus rapid transit service, and it features some characteristics of bus rapid transit services, including limited stops, transit signal priority, and offboard fare payment. Short segments of the route in Downtown Grand Rapids feature dedicated bus lanes.

== Route and service ==
The Laker Line is a 13.3-mile (21.4 km) route, connecting the GVSU main campus in Allendale to its two satellite campuses in Downtown Grand Rapids. The line operates via Lake Michigan Drive, serving a total of 13 stations in Allendale, Walker, and Grand Rapids. Destinations along the Laker Line include the Kirkhof Center, the John Ball Zoo, the GVSU Pew Campus, DeVos Place, the Medical Mile, and the GVSU Center for Health Sciences.

Laker Line buses operate every 10 minutes on weekdays during the GVSU fall and winter semesters, with reduced service during summer semesters and breaks. Weekday evening service operates every 20 minutes, and weekend services are every 30 minutes. All daytime trips operate the full route, and some evening trips are short turn services between the Allendale and Pew campuses. The Laker Line is a limited-stop service, with parallel local service within Kent County provided by The Rapid Route 12 from Monday to Saturday.

Scheduled travel times for the full route range from 37 minutes during weekday peak hours to 30 minutes in late evenings, an average speed of 21.6 to 26.6 mph (34.8 to 42.8 km/h).

== Stations ==
The Laker Line serves 13 stations in each direction, located on the curb at major intersections. All stations feature ticket machines, automatic snowmelt systems in the pavement, and emergency intercoms. 3 stations are shared with the Silver Line.

Station	Locale	The Rapid connecting services	Notes
Kirkhof Center	GVSU Allendale	37, 48, 85	
Mackinac Hall	GVSU Allendale	37	
Ferndale Ave	Walker	7, 12	
Cummings Ave	Walker	12	
Standale Trail	Walker	12	
Maynard Ave	Grand Rapids	12	
Covell Ave	Grand Rapids	12	
Zoo/Garfield Ave	Grand Rapids		Eastbound station signed as John Ball Zoo, westbound signed as Garfield Ave; serves John Ball Zoo
Straight Ave	Grand Rapids		
Pew Campus	Downtown Grand Rapids	DASH	Terminus for some evening trips
Monroe/Louis	Downtown Grand Rapids	6 (SB ONLY), 9, 11, 13, DASH; Silver Line	
DeVos Place	Downtown Grand Rapids	9, 11, 13, DASH; Silver Line	
Medical Mile	Medical Mile	11, 13; Silver Line	
Lafayette Ave	Medical Mile	11,13, 15	Serves GVSU Cook-DeVos Center for Health Sciences

== History ==
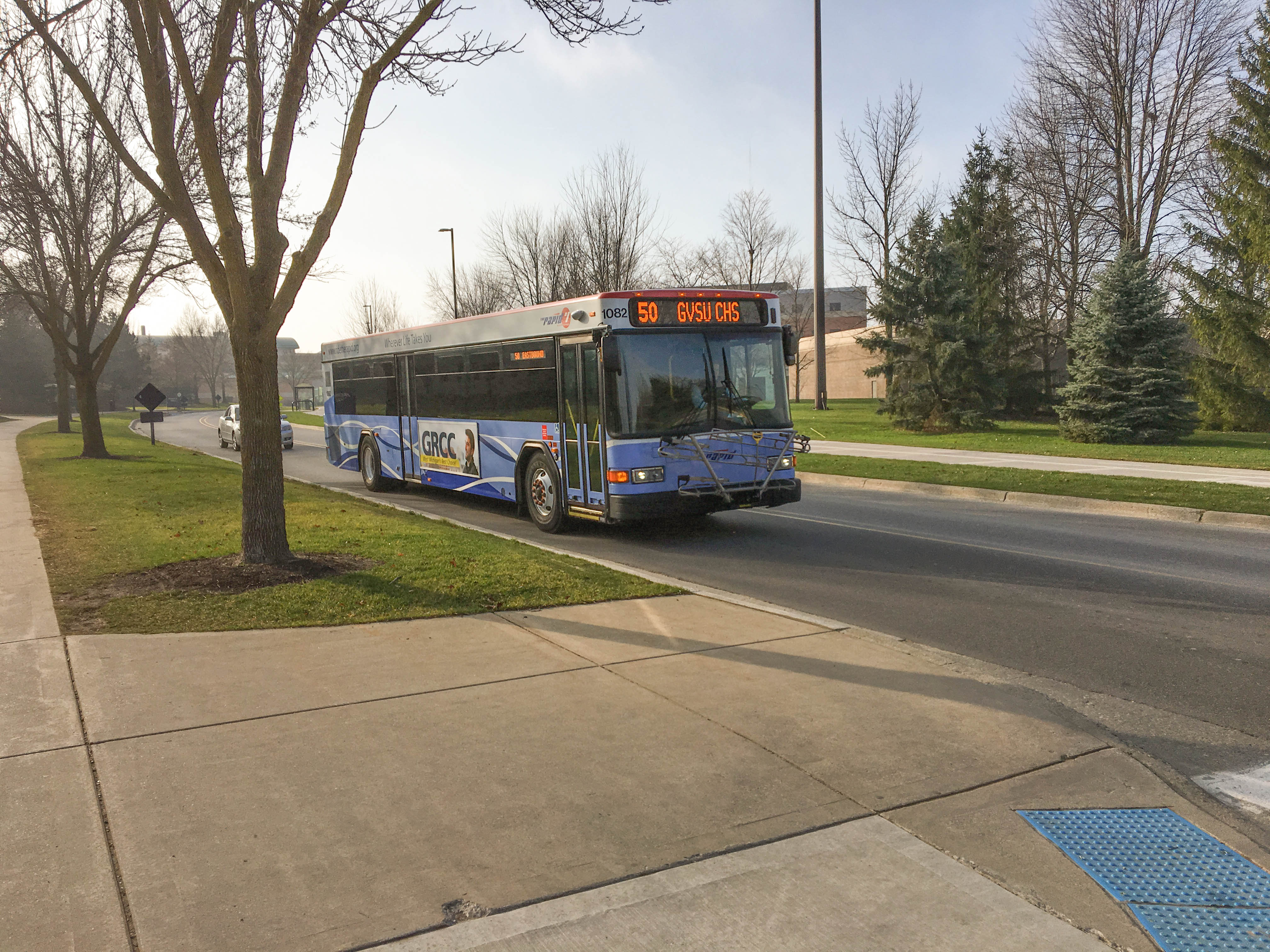
A bus on Route 50, the Laker Line's predecessor, at Mackinac Hall in 2015

The Rapid began operating bus service between Downtown Grand Rapids and Grand Valley State University in Allendale in 2000, funded by the university. The Route 50 "Campus Connector" grew into a popular service, with ridership increasing from 179,000 trips per year in 2002 to 1.4 million in 2012. This rapid ridership growth occurred in tandem with the growth of the GVSU campuses in Downtown Grand Rapids. The Rapid and GVSU increased peak-hour bus service to every six minutes, but still faced significant overcrowding on buses.

The Rapid released a long-range plan in 2010, which included a number of proposed improvements to its services by 2030. The plan included bus rapid transit corridors on Division Avenue and Lake Michigan Drive, and also proposed better frequency and hours of service for standard bus routes. Detailed planning for the project began in 2012, when the Federal Transit Administration awarded The Rapid a $600,000 grant to study options for enhanced transit service along Lake Michigan Drive.

The alternatives analysis for the Lake Michigan Drive project was completed in 2014, the same year as The Rapid's first bus rapid transit line opened. The Silver Line is a limited-stop service with enhanced bus stations along the route, transit signal priority, and bus-only lanes in select locations along the route. The Laker Line proposal was a similar service, serving enhanced stations, but running on city streets in mixed traffic with only short segments of bus-only lanes. The proposal included a fleet of 16 60-foot (18 m) articulated buses dedicated to the Laker Line, which provide additional capacity compared to The Rapid's standard 40-foot (12 m) buses.

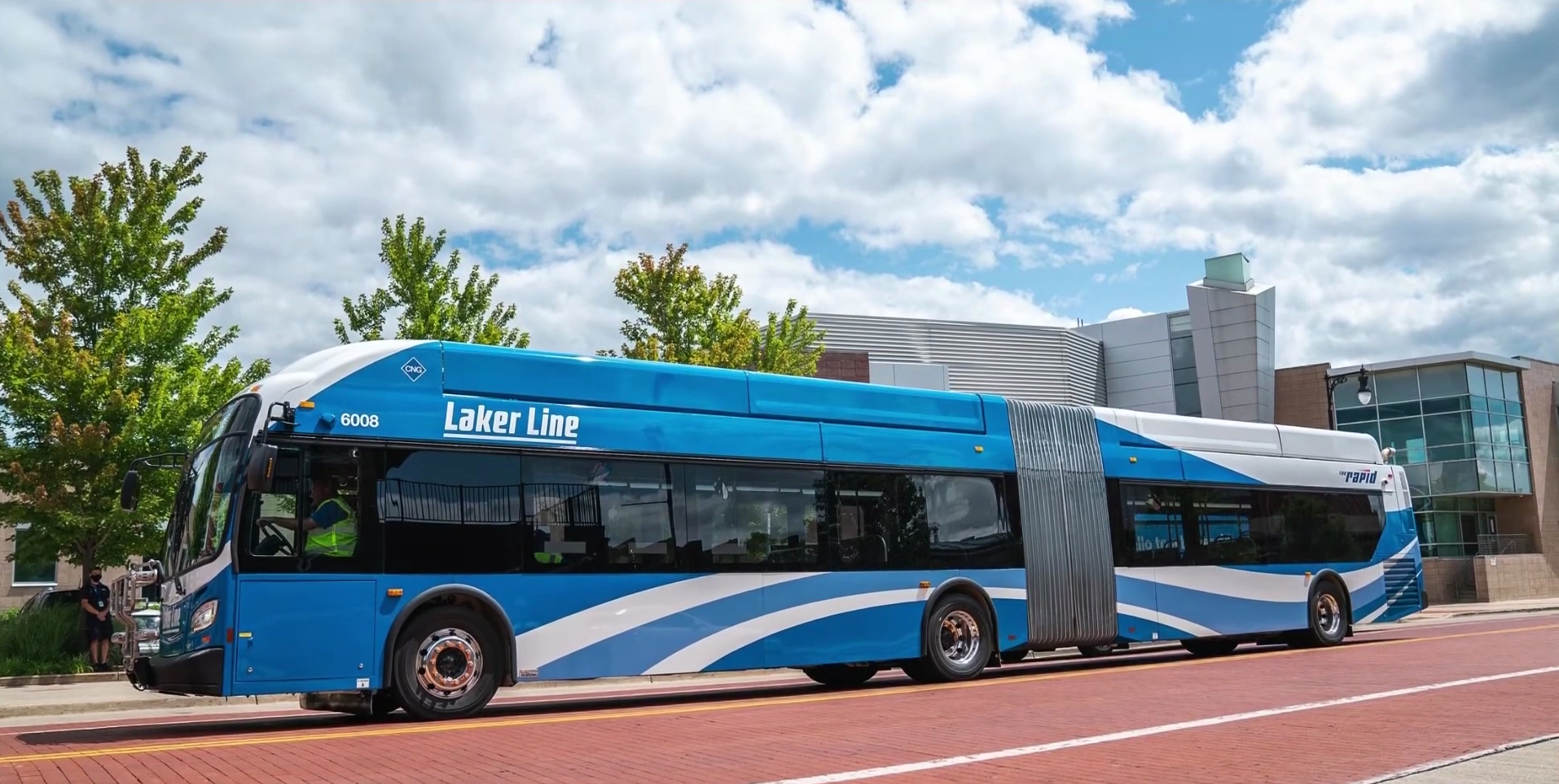
Laker Line bus on display at Rapid Central Station

In February 2018, the Laker Line project was approved for $56.2 million in federal funding under the Federal Transit Administration's Small Starts program. The federal grant covered 80% of the capital cost of the Laker Line system, including the buses and the construction of the stations. The remaining 20% of the capital cost was paid for by the State of Michigan's Comprehensive Transit Fund. Construction began in April 2019, and was estimated to be complete for the Fall 2020 semester at GVSU. The first of the fleet of 16 compressed natural gas-powered buses was received in June 2019.

Service on the Laker Line began on August 24, 2020, in the midst of the COVID-19 pandemic. At the line's launch, bus capacity was limited, and face masks were required. The final cost of the line, including buses, stations, and road work, was $72.8 million.

== Fares ==
The Laker Line is integrated with The Rapid's fare system, and charges standard bus fares. Ticket machines are located at all stations, and tickets must be purchased before boarding the bus. Grand Valley State University students and employees ride for free on the Laker Line and all other The Rapid bus routes, as part of a partnership between GVSU and The Rapid that began the Route 50 service in 2000, and continues to the present with the Laker Line.

== See also ==
- Silver Line (Grand Rapids)
