= John Ball Zoological Garden =

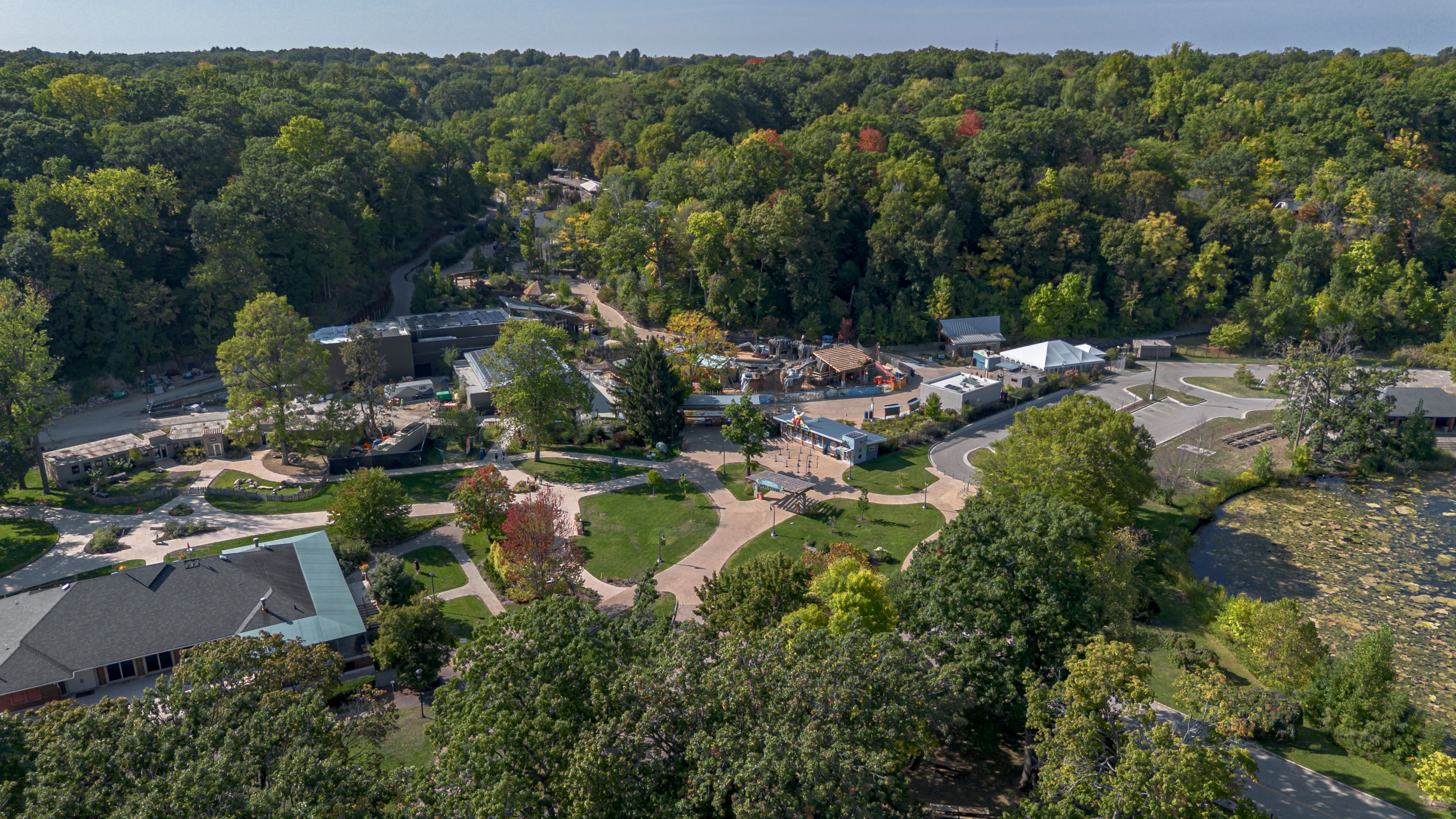
- Aerial image of John Ball Zoo
- Interactive map of John Ball Zoological Garden
- 42°57′46.02″N 85°42′17.24″W
- Date opened: 1891
- Location: Grand Rapids, Michigan, U.S.
- Land area: 140 acres (57 ha)
- No. of animals: 2000+
- No. of species: 238
- Memberships: Association of Zoos and Aquariums
- Public transit: Laker Line; The Rapid
- Website: www.jbzoo.org

John Ball Zoo is located on the west side of the city of Grand Rapids, Michigan, United States. The John Ball Zoo is situated on the ravines and bluffs along the west edge of the property.

The zoo houses more than 2,000 individual animals representing over 200 different species. Through its charitable work, the institution aims to give back "to the community".

The zoo is an accredited member of the Association of Zoos and Aquariums, and was the first zoo in Michigan to receive accreditation.

== History ==
=== Early history ===
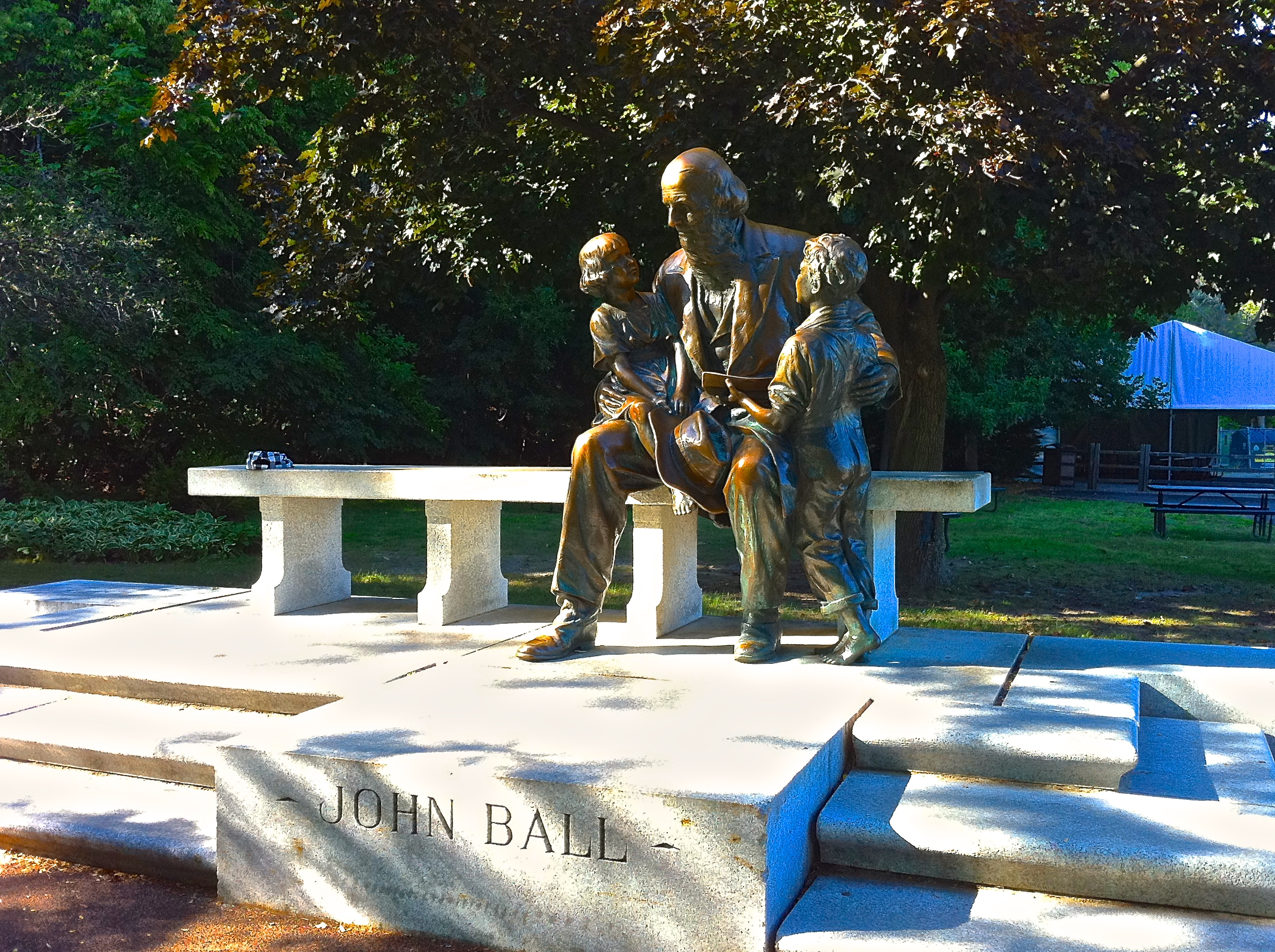
Statue of John Ball in Grand Rapids

The original 40 acres (16 ha) was donated to the city by noted pioneer and explorer John Ball upon his death in 1884. Shortly after, another 100 acres (40 ha) was added and this marked the beginning of additional amenities, including ponds, a theater, a band shell, playgrounds, ball fields, trails, and the zoo. City commission records provide the first mention of animals on the property in 1891, when there was a debate about whether city money should be used to purchase more animals to add to the existing wounded and orphaned animals.

During the Great Depression, the zoo fell on hard times. Most of the collection was given away to other zoos. The buffalo and deer were butchered to help feed the poor. Only a few aging animals remained.

=== Rebirth of the zoo ===
During 1949, Katherine Whinery approached the mayor of Grand Rapids about resurrecting the zoo by forming a zoo society. A deal was made that if a zoo society could be formed, the city would hire a zoo director to run the zoo. Fred Meyer was hired as the first director of the zoo. Construction of the Monkey Island Exhibit, the first major exhibit ever built, was started in 1949 with an opening date of June 1, 1950. During the 1950–1960s, John Ball Zoo was built in the hills of the property.

=== Recent history ===
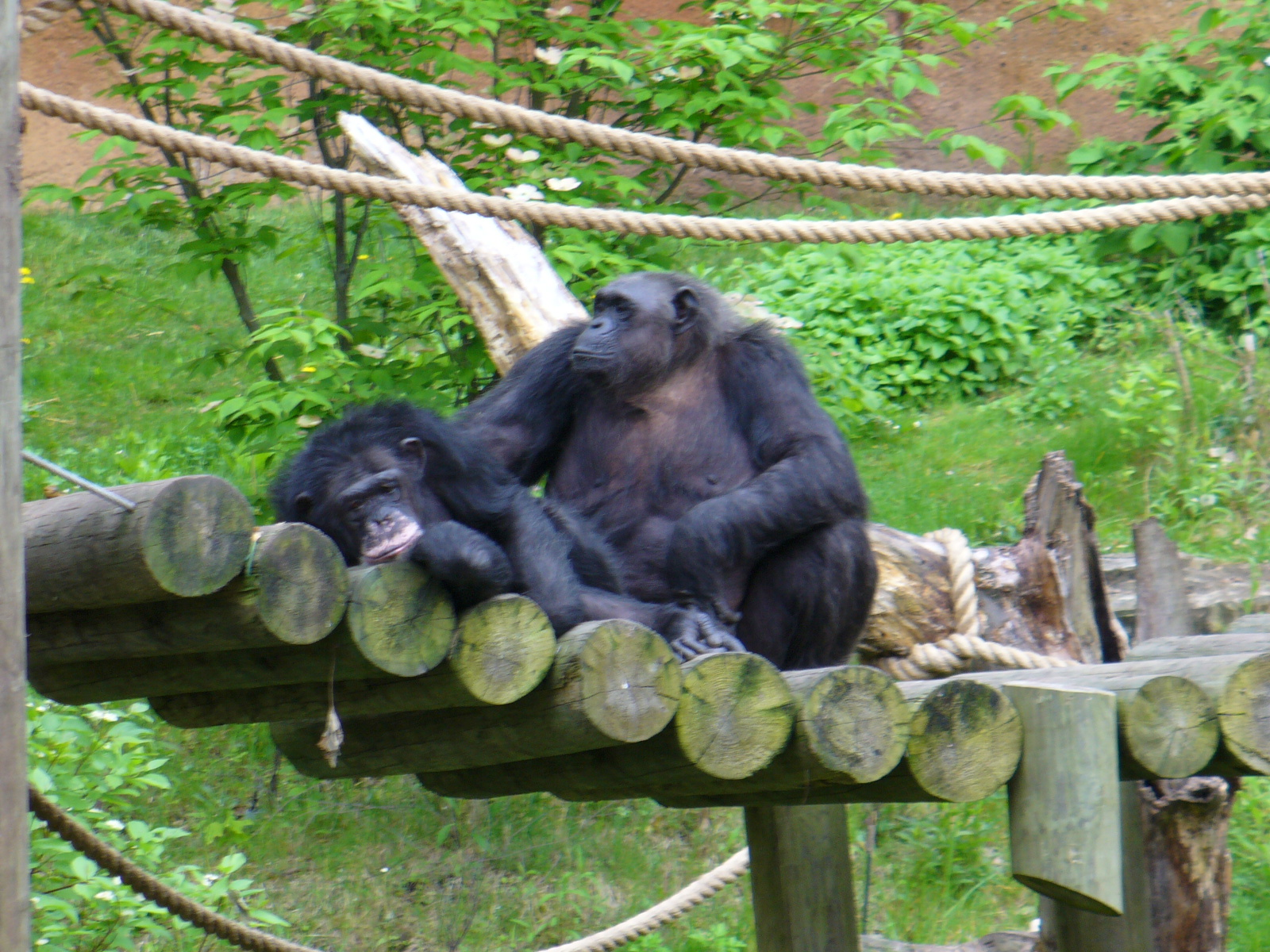
Chimps in the Mokomboso Valley Chimpanzee Exhibit

The John Ball Zoo was operated by the City of Grand Rapids until 1989, when it was deemed a regional asset and sold to Kent County.

During the 1990s, the zoo expanded with the building of Living Shores Aquarium, which is one of two aquariums in the state of Michigan, and a new cafe eating area outside of it. Also done at the same time was a new bald eagle aviary. The Mokomboso Valley Chimpanzee Exhibit opened in 2001.

From 2000 to 2003, controversy arose over idea of moving the zoo further into the flatlands of the property for an elephant exhibit. It pitted the zoo and zoo society against the neighbors. The neighbors tried to get the city of Grand Rapids to designate the whole zoo as a historical site as one way to stop the further development of the zoo. To stop the arguing, Fred Meijer offered to donate land and money if the zoo would move.

In 2004, a ballot was put forward to voters in Kent County to relocate the John Ball Zoological Gardens; the referendum was defeated, and the zoo will remain at its current location for the foreseeable future.

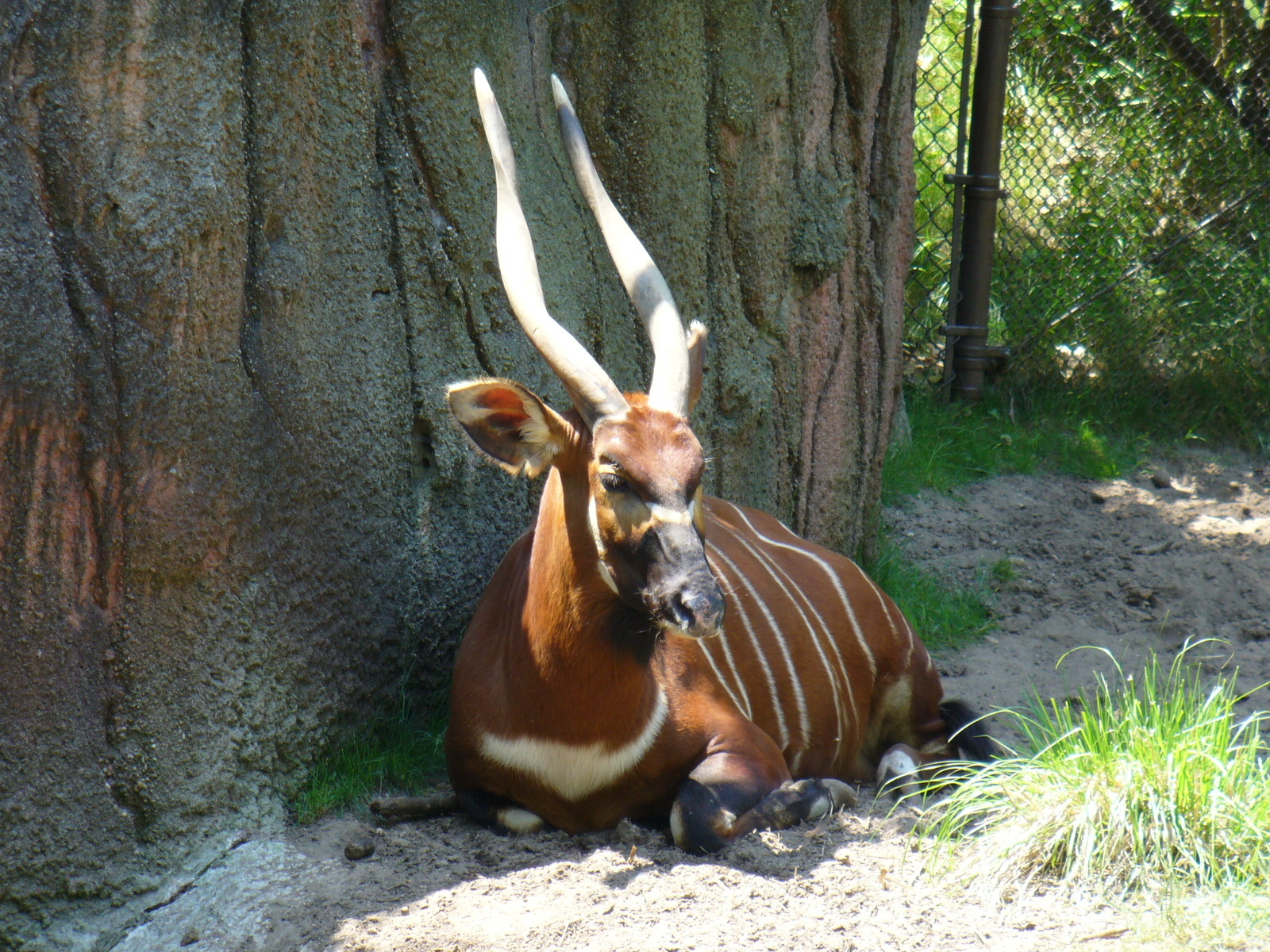
Bongo rests in the shade in the African Veldt Exhibit

In 2005, a new $75–100 million master plan for the zoo was made involving all 140 acres (57 ha) of the zoo and property. Besides the existing camels, African veld, chimps, petting zoo, and animal hospital exhibits, it reworks the whole zoo. The new plan for the zoo features a system of streams named "Grand Rivers of the World" that would connect the zoo to the property surrounding the zoo.

On April 27, 2007, the zoo broke ground on the first phase of the new master plan, starting construction of a $4.1 million 0.3-acre (1,200 m^{2}) "BISSELL Lions of Lake Manyara" exhibit. The zoo has not had a lion since "Gilda", their last lion, died of old age in 2005. The exhibit was built for six lions, but only three were placed in the exhibit.

On June 21, 2008, the new green lion exhibit was open to the public.

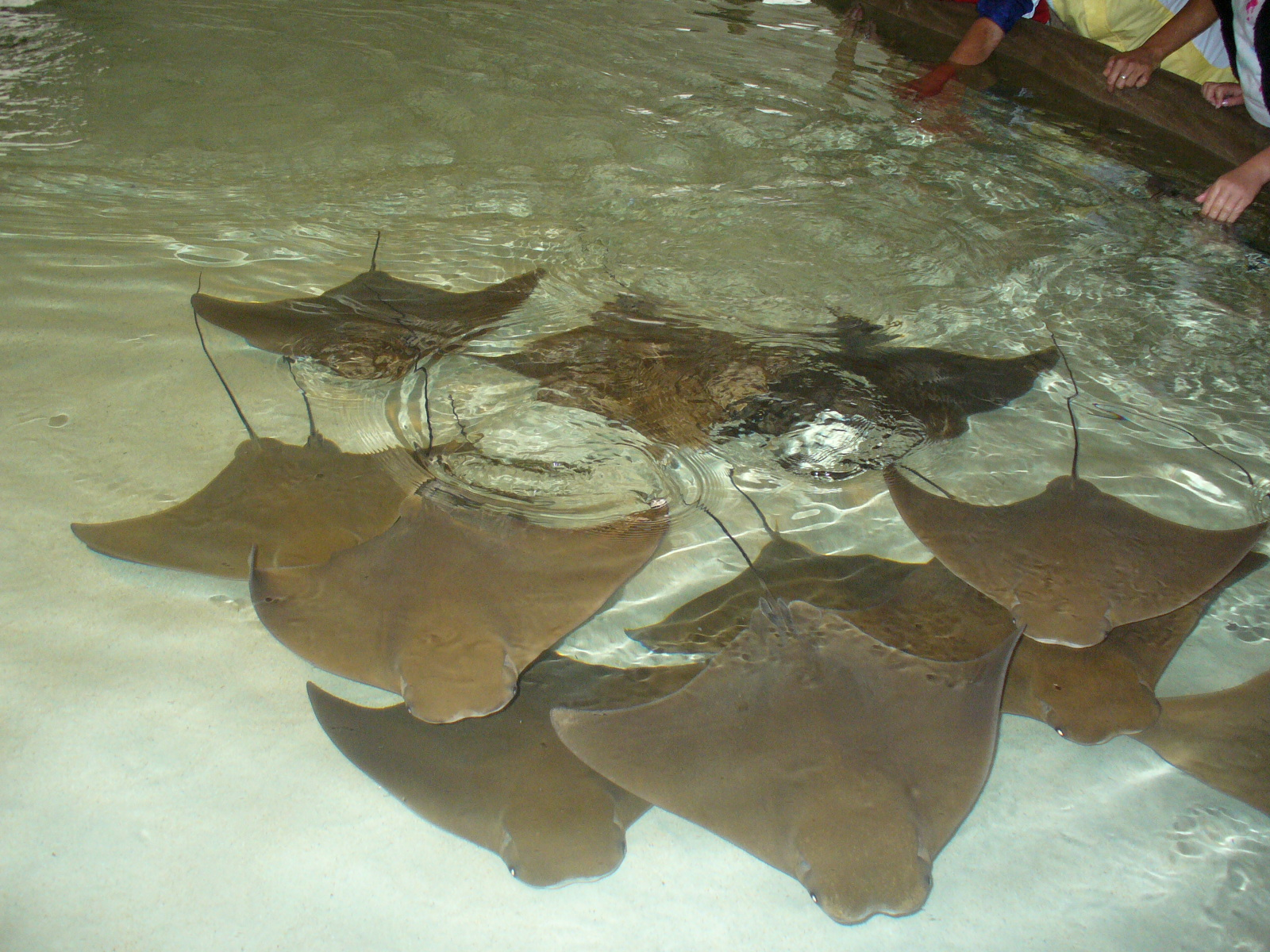
Stingrays in the Stingray Lagoon

Kent County including in the 2008-2009 Capital Improvement Allocation half the cost of renovation of the Monkey Island Exhibit. The other half of renovation is supposed to come from the zoo society. As expected the spider monkeys roamed the new island in May 2009. The waist high concrete wall that surround the exhibit will be removed. The cement floor and rocks of the exhibit and moat will be removed and replaced with grass and more natural looking rocks.

In 2014 the zoo formed a non profit to take ownership of the zoo independent of Kent county to help facilitate further growth for the institution.

On July 8, 2016, the stingray lagoon exhibit was closed after all 18 cownose stingrays and three spotted bamboo sharks died due to a mechanical malfunction. A heavy rainstorm, which shorted a pump circuit, was blamed for the deaths. The backup system intended to alert zoo officials of a pump failure also failed.

==== Inclined railway ====
In August 2012, an inclined railway was opened at the zoo. A train of three cars linked together provides a four-minute ride to the upper areas of the park. The zoo calls it a funicular, but technically it is in the category of inclined elevator since there are not two vehicles (or trains in this case) that counterbalance each other. In either case the configuration as a three-car train rather than one car makes it an unusual example.

== Animal collection ==
Species	Individuals
43 mammals	149
58 birds	219
41 reptiles	79
11 amphibians	26
35 fish	318
48 invertebrates	391
236 total species	1182 total animals

Most animals at John Ball Zoo were born in another zoo. Few of the animals are taken from the wild. Almost all the wild animals are at the zoo because they sustained injuries and can no longer live in their natural habitat.

In 2004, the zoo added a Komodo dragon named Precious. Precious died in December 2014, of natural causes.

During 2005, the zoo created an Australian walk-through exhibit that featured wallabies and budgies. The wallabies, if they want to, can come out in the walk way to be petted.

On May 9, 2007, the river otters had a baby boy. It first went out in the exhibit mid-July.

In early September, the female black-footed cat had two kittens.

The ring-tailed lemur exhibit was started in March 2009 and came out in May.

In 2010, the zoo brought in a troop of Guinea baboons, the largest alligator outside of Florida, moved their flamingos to another pond, and altered the old tiger exhibit to hold a rock hyrax and a group of colobus monkeys.

In 2021, John Ball Zoo announced that a new habitat at the entrance of the zoo was in the process of being built for pygmy hippos, the exhibit will also be home to a pair of white storks. The exhibit is planned to open in 2023. In 2022, John Ball Zoo hosted two male koalas from the San Diego Zoo Global Education and Conservation Project. After they arrived, their exhibit opened on May 11, 2022.

The zoo also offers a number of 'Close Encounters' guests can book for an additional cost, including visiting with a red panda, feeding a hippo, or interacting with a sloth.

List of animals

Mammals

- African lion
- Amur tiger
- Black-headed spider monkey
- Black howler monkey
- Cape porcupine
- Canada lynx
- Chacoan peccary
- Chimpanzee
- Cotton-top tamarin
- Dromedary camel
- Eastern bongo
- Geoffroy's spider monkey
- Goeldi's monkey
- Grizzly bear
- Linnaeus's two-toed sloth
- Meerkat
- North American porcupine
- North American river otter
- Pygmy hippopotamus
- Red-necked wallaby
- Red panda
- Ring-tailed lemur
- Six-banded armadillo
- Snow leopard
- Warthog
- White-nosed coati

Birds

- African grey parrot
- Bald eagle
- Bali myna
- Barn owl
- Black swan
- Chilean flamingo
- Common barn owl
- Egyptian goose
- Golden eagle
- Great horned owl
- Kelp gull
- Magellanic penguin
- Nicobar pigeon
- Pied crow
- Snowy owl
- Southern ground hornbill
- Sulphur-crested cockatoo
- Taveta weaver
- Toco toucan
- Turkey vulture
- White stork

Reptiles

- Baron's racer
- Boa constrictor
- Carrot-tail viper gecko
- Chinese crocodile lizard
- Chuckwalla
- Crested partridge
- Cuvier's dwarf caiman
- Green keel-bellied lizard
- Geyr’s spiny-tailed lizard
- Gila monster
- Grand Cayman blue iguana
- Green tree python
- Madagascar giant day gecko
- Northern water snake
- Red-footed tortoise
- Reticulated python
- Tiger ratsnake
- Western diamond back

Amphibians

- Emperor newt
- Chacoan horned frog
- Dyeing poison dart frog
- Golden poison dart frog
- Grey tree frog
- Kaup's caecilian
- Magnificent tree frog
- Mantella frog
- Panamanian golden frog
- Poison dart frog
- Red-eyed tree frog
- Reed frog
- Sambava tomato frog
- Vietnamese mossy frog

Fish

- Brook trout
- Leopard shark
- Moray eel
- Nurse shark
- Rainbow trout
- Señorita
- Wolf eel

Invertebrates

- Brazilian salmon tarantula
- Giant cave cockroach
- Giant Japanese spider crab
- Sea anemone
- Sea star
- Sea urchin
- Spiny lobster

== Education and conservation ==
=== Education ===
John Ball Zoo School is a sixth grade only magnet school for the Grand Rapids Public Schools. Each year, sixty students are selected for the school. The school teaches the normal Grand Rapids Public Schools curriculum but with a specialization using the zoo as a lab. The John Ball Zoo school has extra curricular studies and admission is based mostly on students' Michigan Educational Assessment Program scores. The students are required to complete large projects, including studying current events and environmental issues as part of the specialized curriculum. Learning is done mostly by hands-on experiences; for instance, students are able to go to the zoo frequently and have extended yet limited access to go inside certain animal enclosures.

=== Wildlife Conservation Fund ===
In 1985, a conservation fund was started by John Boyles. The fund pays special attention to native Michigan animals, but also has funded programs in support of endangered amphibians and reptiles. The Wildlife Conservation Fund has funded projects that helped conserve wildlife and habitats in 30 countries.

== Proposed aquarium ==
Since the 2010s, Grand Rapids city planners began to envision an aquarium in West Michigan. By 2020, development organization Grand Action 2.0 and John Ball Zoo began to form more concrete ideas on the creation of a new aquarium that they said would rival the Shedd Aquarium in Chicago, with an outlook of opening the facility in 5 to 10 years. In 2023, planners decided to not have the aquarium be located in Muskegon County, instead choosing to have an aquarium constructed in Kent County.

The zoo revealed a concept of constructing a $400 million aquarium on a property of 190 acres (0.77 km^{2}) located beside the Grand River in Walker, Michigan at the former Fenske Landfill, a filled-in hazardous waste disposal site. The following month in July 2025, current and former Grand Rapids city leaders, along with other entities linked to development in downtown Grand Rapids, began a series of private meetings codenamed "Tokyo" to convince Kent County, which oversees John Ball Zoo, to move their proposal to Grand Rapids. In the July 31 meeting, participants proposed the sites of the Padnos scrapyard near 314 Straight Ave. SW, the decommissioned Coldbrook water pumping station located at 1101 Monroe Ave. NW and the Grand Rapids Development Center located at 1120 Monroe Ave. NW. A little over a month later on September 5, 2025, the Tokyo meeting participants settled on 555 Monroe Ave. NW, a 3.7 acres (0.015 km^{2}) lot, being the preferred site, noting other notable aquariums with smaller footprints such as Boston's New England Aquarium and the Monterey Bay Aquarium in Monterey, California. The September meeting also discussed acquiring lots across Monroe Avenue from Michigan State University and a nearby property across Interstate 196 from the United States Postal Service to expand the scale of the aquarium and any necessary parking.

MLive reported on the Tokyo meetings in April 2026, with the meeting participants stating that they did not want to interfere with the decision process of Kent County. In the article, MLive wrote that site testing results showed that the level of contaminants were higher than thresholds to receive clean up approval by state officials, with a Michigan Department of Environment, Great Lakes, and Energy report writing that the high level of pollution in groundwater near the area "indicates that the dike and/or other landfill control measures may be failing to keep leachate from migrating outward." A month later on May 14, 2026, John Ball Zoo announced that it decided to not build the proposed aquarium at the Fenske Landfill site in Walker, citing environmental and infrastructure concerns.

== See also ==
- List of funicular railways
