= Allendale High School =

Public school in Allendale, Michigan, United States

Location
- 10760 68th Avenue; Allendale, Michigan 49401; United States; 42°57′53″N 85°57′3″W

Information
- Type: Public
- Motto: Persevere, Respect, Invite, Discover, Engage
- Established: 1969
- School district: Allendale Public Schools
- Superintendent: Garth Cooper
- Principal: Audra Murphy
- Teaching staff: 36.98 (FTE)
- Grades: 9-12
- Enrollment: 772 (2023-2024)
- Student to teacher ratio: 20.88
- Campus: Rural
- Colors: Red, White, Black
- Athletics conference: River Cities Alliance
- Mascot: Freddie the Falcon
- Nickname: Falcons
- Rival: Coopersville Broncos
- Website: AHS website

Student assessments
- 2021–22 school year Change vs. prior year

M-STEP 11th grade proficiency rates (Science / Social Studies)
- Advanced %: 21.7 / 17.2
- Proficient %: 18.4 / 29.8
- PR. Proficient %: 13.8 / 39.1
- Not Proficient %: 46.1 / 13.9

Average test scores
- SAT Total: 1010.8 (▼ −31.2)

"Never Give Up." -Jacksen Fitton

Allendale High School is located in Allendale, Michigan, in the United States. It is the sole high school in Allendale Public Schools, serving grades 9–12.

== History ==
Allendale High opened in 1969 in an annex to the old school building on Lake Michigan Drive. Until then, Allendale had been a K-8 district; high school students were bused to Coopersville, Zeeland or Hudsonville depending on the location.

The Lake Michigan Drive building housed all twelve grades under one roof, until residents voted to build a middle school/high school along 68th Avenue for students in sixth through twelfth grade. Construction on the current school building began in late 1995 and finished in early August 1997. Before construction, students at the high school level would attend school at the prior building on Lake Michigan Drive. This The middle school/high school has since become a high school only building with the construction of a new middle school. The high school was constructed of one rural building, with the addition of a high school auditorium and a gym located south of the auditorium. The classroom hallways stretch onto two levels of the northwest section of the school. The school built an auditorium which finished construction on April 16, 2005, naming it the Ceglerek Fine Arts Center (CFAC). Since opening, the CFAC has been home to several wonderful performances. With 789 seats and a spacious stage, the CFAC has the feel of a large auditorium with the intimacy of a small house.

In 2003, the district began building brand new athletic facilities, including locker rooms, in the south entrance wing, next to the gymnasium. The athletic department also sponsored a new weight room and student and staff parking lots outside the athletic entrances. With the renovations, the school remodeled the basketball gym and renamed it Coach Ken Pierce Court, after former Allendale basketball coach, Ken Pierce. In 2014, the school remodeled Falcon Stadium outside Allendale High School, replacing the old track with a new rubber track, and a brand new football field.

== Athletics ==
Allendale High School's nickname is The Falcons. Most teams compete in the River Cities Alliance. Allendale currently offers the following sports:

- Baseball (boys)
- Basketball (boys and girls)
- Bowling (boys and girls)
- Competitive cheer (girls)
- Cross Country (boys and girls)
- Football (boys)
- Golf (boys and girls)
- Softball (girls)
- Soccer (boys and girls)
- Track & Field (boys and girls)
- Volleyball (girls)
- Wrestling (boys and girls)
- AHS Concert Choir
- AHS Chamber Choir
- AHS Select Women's Ensemble
- AHS Marching band
- AHS Jazz Band

== Notable alumni ==
Robert Jackson, former NFL Player

Terra Booe, GVSU Women's Wrestler

Jaxon Ramos, United States Military Academy Wrestler

Kennadi Galy, Track and Field Champion
