= The Meadows at Grand Valley State University =

Golf course in Allendale, Michigan

Coordinates: 42°58′00″N 85°53′55″W

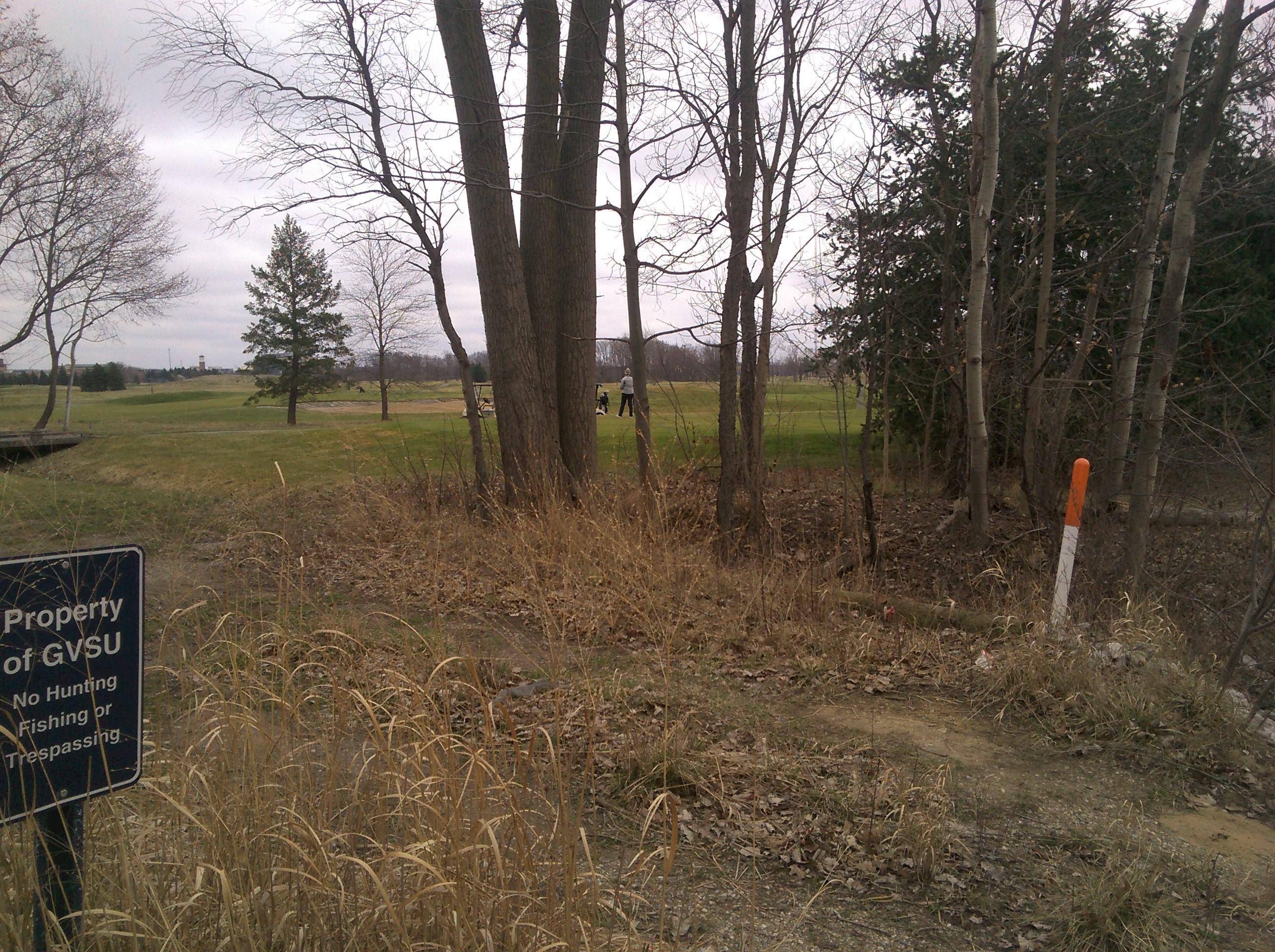
- Interactive map of The Meadows at Grand Valley State University

Club information
- Location: Allendale, Michigan, U.S.
- Established: 1994
- Type: Public / University
- Owner: Grand Valley State University
- Operator: Grand Valley State University
- Tota holes: 18
- Tournaments: 6 NCAA National Championships
- Website: gvsu.edu/meadows
- Designed by: Dr. Michael John Hurdzan
- Par: 72
- Length: 7,060 yds
- Course rating: 74.2/137

The Meadows at Grand Valley State University in Allendale, Michigan, is the home of the Grand Valley State Lakers men's and women's golf teams. The links-style championship course was designed by Michael John Hurdzan in 1994. The course has hosted six NCAA National Championships since its opening and will host the women's National Championship in the spring of 2011. The Meadows has been explained as "One of the first West Michigan golf courses classified as upscale," by Michigan Golf. The course is located on the northwest quadrant of GVSU's main Allendale campus.

== Rankings ==
The course is ranked the 22nd best college golf course in the nation by Links Magazine.

== Tournaments ==
The Meadows has played host to both NCAA and Michigan High School Athletic Association (MHSAA) tournaments.

Year	NCAA	MHSAA
1996	DII Women's National Championship	none
1998	DII Women's National Championship	none
2001	DII Men's National Championship	none
2002	DII Women's National Championship	none
2003	none	Boy's State Championships
2004	none	Boy's and Girl's State Championships
2005	none	Boys State Championships
2006	DII Women's National Championship	Boy's and Girl's State Championships
2007	DII Men's National Championship	Girl's State Championships
2008	none	Boy's State Championships
2009	none	Boy's and Girl's State Championships
2010	none	Boy's and Girl's State Championships
2011	DI Women's National Championship	none
