= GVSU Fieldhouse =

Sports arena near Grand Rapids, Michigan, U.S.

GVSU Fieldhouse Arena
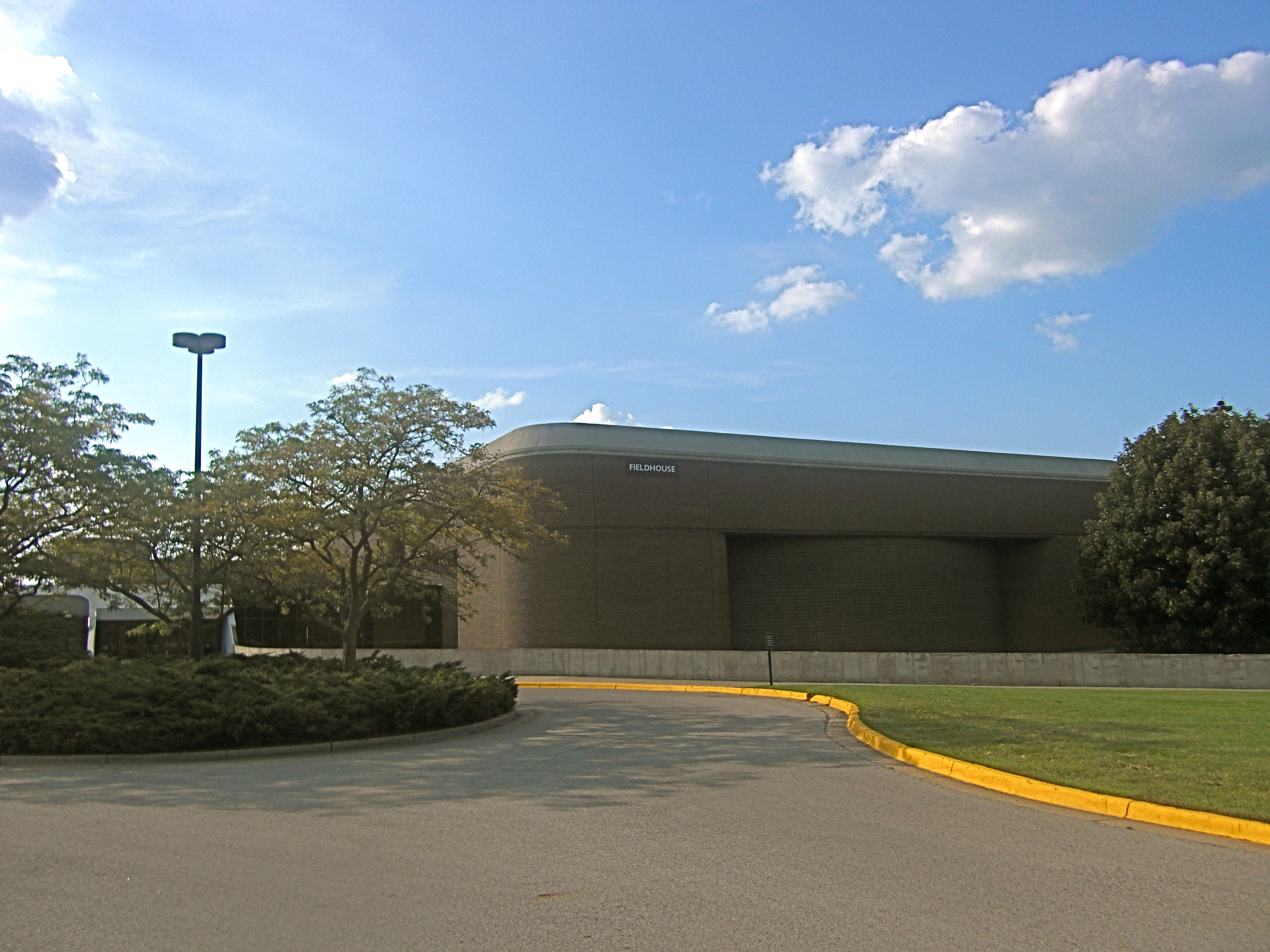
- Interactive map of GVSU Fieldhouse Arena
- Location: North Campus Drive, Allendale, Michigan 49401
- Coordinates: 42.966837°N 85.889794°W
- Owner: Grand Valley State University
- Operator: Grand Valley State University
- Capacity: 4,200

Construction
- Opened: 1982

Tenants
- Grand Valley State Lakers men's and women's basketball and volleyball (NCAA)

GVSU Fieldhouse Arena is a 4,200-seat indoor arena located in Allendale, Michigan, a suburb of Grand Rapids, on the campus of Grand Valley State University. It was built in the early 1980s as the home of the Grand Valley State University Lakers basketball and volleyball teams, as it remains to this day. The current fieldhouse replaced the former one when the roof of the "Dome" over the arena became unstable and was condemned.

The 300,000-square-foot (28,000 m^{2}) fieldhouse was created as a multipurpose facility; in addition to intercollegiate events, it is also used for intramural sports, trade shows, meetings, conventions, commencement ceremonies and concerts. The arena seats up to 5,900 for concerts; the arena floor measures 45,000 square feet (4,200 m^{2}). It is located in the northwest part of campus along with most all other athletics facilities.

== Laker Nation ==
Laker Nation, Grand Valley's student section for all sports, typically has a large attendance present at sporting events held in the GVSU Fieldhouse Arena.

== Notable performances ==
(Former and present fieldhouse)

- Aerosmith
- REO Speedwagon
- Santana
- the Eagles
- Frank Zappa
- Hoodie Allen
- Hillary Clinton
- Peter Frampton
- Ted Nugent
- Bill Cosby
- Hellogoodbye
- The Black Eyed Peas
- Motion City Soundtrack
- Steve Aoki
- Dan + Shay
- All Time Low
- INXS
- Chris Rock
- Yung Gravy
