= Pierre Constant =

French actor and stage director (1933–2026)

- Born: 6 September 1933; Toulouse, France
- Died: 16 September 2026 (aged 93); Sainte-Livrade-sur-Lot, France
- Occupations: Actor; Stage director

Pierre Constant (French: [pjˈɛʁ kɔ̃stˈɑ̃]; 6 September 1933 – 16 September 2026) was a French actor and stage director.

Constant was primarily active in the theatre, participating in plays and operas. He also had a brief television career and was the 2012 recipient of the Prix Pelléas for his book Violon solo, la musique de Jean Genet.

Constant died in Sainte-Livrade-sur-Lot on 16 September 2026, at the age of 93.

== Filmography ==
=== Film ===
- La Ballade de Pabuji (1976)

=== Television ===
- Le Massacre des innocents (1961)
- L'histoire dépasse la fiction (1961)
- Le Théâtre de la jeunesse (1961)
- Les Trois Henry (1962)
