= Grand Valley Lanthorn =

- Type: Student newspaper
- Owner: Grand Valley State University
- Founded: October 1968
- Headquarters: Allendale, Michigan
- Website: lanthorn.com

The Grand Valley Lanthorn is the student-run newspaper for Grand Valley State University in Allendale, Michigan. The Lanthorn is printed every other week during the academic year (Late August through April). It is not printed over academic breaks, and there are typically two issues over the summer months. The "Lanthorn" prints 3,000 copies per individual publication and also operates its own website.

The word "lanthorn" is derived from an old English word meaning "look out" or "lantern." A lanthorn was constructed of leather and a lens made of ox or steer horn, it was used for lighting or as a beacon. The common pronunciation of the word on campus is lan-thorn, although the proper pronunciation is lant-horn.

== History ==
The Grand Valley Lanthorn first traces its history back to November 22, 1963, with the founding of at the time Grand Valley State College's first student-run newspaper, "The Keystone". The Keystone did not last long however, and had its last edition published on January 22, 1966. It was then replaced by GVSC's second newspaper, "The Valley View", on October 28, 1966 until its last publication on June 6, 1968.

In October 1968, the college changed the name again, this time to "The Lanthorn". The internet edition of the newspaper, www.lanthorn.com, appeared in 1995, and was the first online edition of a weekly Michigan collegiate newspaper. The Lanthorn grew to broadsheet size on August 27, 1997 and averaged 20–24 pages in length each week.

On January 13, 2000, the newspaper changed its name for the last time to the "Grand Valley Lanthorn". The GVL expanded to publications twice per week circulating 8,000 copies per publication to both the Allendale and Grand Rapids campuses. GVSU is a Division II athletics school, and the newspaper competes at the Division II level for the Michigan College Press Association Awards.

== Controversy ==
The Lanthorn has been involved in several controversies over its history, including a First Amendment lawsuit when the Ottawa County, Michigan sheriff's department closed down the newspaper in 1969 for printing several vulgar words. GVSU sued the sheriff, and eventually, the Michigan Attorney General sided with the university in order to settle the case before it reached a court.

In 2008, a new county-wide smoking ban was established, which prohibited smoking within 25 feet of building entrances. When the Lanthorn's News Editor, Michelle Hamilton, questioned school officials about ash trays kept at building entrances, which defied the ban, she was told, "As it relates to this ordinance, Grand Valley State University is subject to its own jurisdiction pursuant to the Michigan Constitution. In other words, we are responsible for making our own smoking policies." Hamilton wrote additional stories and follow-up that led to statewide publicity on the matter and Grand Valley State University eventually created a forum to implement new smoking policies.
