= List of Utah companies =

The following is a list of companies based in Utah.

== Companies based in Utah ==
Name	City	Industry	Formed
1-800 Contacts	Draper	Contact lens retail	1995
Action Target	Provo	Shooting ranges	1986
Alpine Air Express	Provo	Airline	1972
Alsco	Salt Lake City	Linen and uniform rental	1889
Altabank	American Fork	Banking	1913
Altiris	Lindon	Software	1998
Altra Running	Logan	Running shoes	2009
Amano Artisan Chocolate	Orem	Confectionery	2006
America First Credit Union	Riverdale	Banking	1939
American Biotech	Alpine	Nanotechnology	1998
Ancestry.com	Lehi	Family history	1983
Arctic Circle Restaurants	Midvale	Fast food	1950
ASEA	Pleasant Grove	Dietary supplements	2007
Associated Food Stores	Salt Lake City	Retailers' cooperative	1940
Avalanche Software	Salt Lake City	Video game development	1995
Bank of Utah	Ogden	Banking	1952
Backcountry	Park City	Outdoor retail	1996
BambooHR	Lindon	Human Resources services	2008
Bask Technology	Orem	Technical support	2004
Black Diamond Equipment	Holladay	Outdoor equipment	1989
Black Rifle Coffee Company	Salt Lake City	Coffee, Mugs, Clothing	2014
Bluehost	Provo	Domain Name System provider	2003
Blendtec	Orem	Blenders	1975
Boart Longyear	Salt Lake City	Drilling Services & Products	1890
Bonneville International Media Group	Salt Lake City	Broadcasting	1964
Breeze Airways	Cottonwood Heights	Airline	2018
Browning Arms Company	Morgan	Firearms	1878
Bullfrog International	Bluffdale	Hot tubs	1997
Cafe Rio	Salt Lake City	Fast food	1997
Callware Technologies	Salt Lake City	Telecommunications, software	1994
Cedar Fort	Springville	Book publishing	1986
Cannonball Musical Instruments	Sandy	Musical instruments	1996
Central Bank	Provo	Banking	1891
CHG Healthcare Services	Midvale	Healthcare	1979
Christopherson Business Travel	Salt Lake City	Travel	1953
Chuck-A-Rama	Salt Lake City	Restaurant	1966
CircusTrix	Provo	Extreme sport	2011
Construction Monitor	Cedar City	Construction	1989
Crown Burgers	Salt Lake City	Fast food	1978
Crumbl Cookies	Lindon	Fast food	2017
Daynes Music	Midvale	Music store	1862
Daz Productions	Salt Lake City	Software	2000
Deseret Book Company	Salt Lake City	Book publishing	1866
Deseret Industries	Salt Lake City	Non-profit organization	1938
Desert Tech	West Valley City	Firearms	2007
DigiCert	Lehi	Internet security	2003
Domo	American Fork	Software	2010
Doppelmayr USA	Salt Lake City	Aerial lift	2002
doTerra	Pleasant Grove	Essential oils	2008
DevMountain	Provo	Education	2013
Eborn Books	Salt Lake City	Book publishing, Bookselling	1989
eFileCabinet	Lehi	Document management	2001
Emery Telcom	Orangeville	Telecommunications	1950
EnergySolutions	Salt Lake City	Waste management	2006
Evans & Sutherland	Salt Lake City	Software	1968
Extra Space Storage	Cottonwood Heights	Self storage	1977
Fishbowl Inventory	Orem	Inventory management software	2001
FJ Management	Salt Lake City	Transportation	1968
FlexSim Software Products	Orem	Software	1993
Folio Corporation	Provo	Genealogy	1987
FranklinCovey	West Valley City	Education	1997
Gossner Foods	Logan	Cheese	1966
GumCo	Salt Lake City	Advertising, Marketing	2013
HackHands	Farmington	Distance learning	2013
High West Distillery	Park City	Alcoholic beverages	2007
HZO	Salt Lake City	Nanotechnology	2009
iArchives	Lindon	Historical documents	1994
IM Flash Technologies	Lehi	Semiconductors	2006
Indulgent Foods	Farmington	Food	1990
Intermountain Healthcare	Salt Lake City	Health care	1975
Intermountain Power Agency	West Jordan	Energy	1977
Instructure	Salt Lake City	Learning management system	2008
International Armoring Corporation	Ogden	Armored car manufacturings	1993
Ivanti	South Jordan	Software	1985
Jaybird	Salt Lake City	Consumer electronics	2006
Kennecott Land	South Jordan	Real estate development	2001
Kennecott Utah Copper	South Jordan	Mining	1898
Kuali	Salt Lake City	Education software	2004
Lagoon	Farmington	Amusement park	1886
The Leavitt Group	Cedar City	Insurance	1952
Liberty Safe and Security Products	Payson	Safe and Security products	1988
Lifetime Products	Clearfield	Blow-molded polyethylene furniture	1986
Management and Training Corporation	Centerville	For-profit prisons	1981
Maxwell Products	Salt Lake City	Pavement preservation	1975
Megaplex Theatres	Sandy	Movie Theater	1999
Mity-Lite	Orem	Portable furniture	1987
Morinda	Provo	Dietary supplements, personal care products	1996
Mountain America Credit Union	Sandy	Banking	1934
Mountain West Energy	Orem	Petroleum	2005
Myriad Genetics	Salt Lake City	Biotechnology	1991
Nature's Sunshine Products	Lehi	Dietary supplements	1972
NetDocuments	Lehi	Cloud storage	1999
North American Arms	Provo	Firearms	1972
Nu Skin Enterprises	Provo	Dietary supplements, personal care products	1984
Omniture	Orem	Web analytics	1996
Overstock.com	Midvale	Retail	1997
Pluralsight	Farmington	Education software as a service	2004
PoliticIt	Logan	Software	2011
Powdr Corporation	Park City	Ski resorts	1994
Qualtrics	Provo	Experience management	2002
Quest Aerospace	Cedar City	Model rockets	1992
RC Willey Home Furnishings	Salt Lake City	Retail home furnishings	1932
Red Touch Media	Salt Lake City	Content management	2001
Redemption Bank	Holladay	Banking	2025
Revere Health	Provo	Health care	1960
S&S - Sansei Technologies	Logan	Amusement ride manufacturer	1994
Sarcos	Salt Lake City	Robotics	1983
Sawtooth Software	Provo	Research software engineering	1983
Saygus	South Jordan	Smartphones	2009
SCO Group	Lindon	Software	1994
Signature Books	Salt Lake City	Book publishing	1980
SilencerCo	West Valley City	Firearms	2008
Sinclair Oil Corporation	Salt Lake City	Petroleum	1916
SirsiDynix	Lehi	Software	2005
Skullcandy	Park City	Consumer electronics	2003
Skycraft Airplanes	Orem	Light-sport aircraft manufacturing	2012
SkyWest	St. George	Holding company	2005
SkyWest Airlines	St. George	Airline	1972
Smith's Food and Drug	Salt Lake City	Retail	1911
Sportsman's Warehouse	Midvale	Outdoor retail	1986
State Bank of Southern Utah	Cedar City	Banking	1957
Teleperformance USA	Salt Lake City	Call Center	1978
Uinta Brewing Company	Salt Lake City	Alcoholic beverages	1993
USANA Health Sciences	West Valley City	Dietary supplements, personal care products	1992
UtahAmerican Energy	Sandy	Mining	1996
VIA Motors	Orem	Electric vehicles	2010
Vivint	Provo	Home security	1997
Vivint Solar	Lehi	solar energy	2011
Vulcan Tire	Sandy	Tire retail	1997
W.W. Clyde Company	Orem	Heavy civil construction	1926
Wahoo Studios	Orem	Video game development	2001
Wilson Audio Specialties	Provo	Consumer electronics	1974
Winder Farms	West Valley City	Grocery	1880
Wing Enterprises	Springville	Ladder manufacturing	1975
Workfront	Lehi	Project management software	2001
XMission	Salt Lake City	Internet service provider	1993
YESCO	Salt Lake City	Signage & lighting	1920
Young Living	Lehi	Essential oils	1993
Younique	Lehi	Cosmetics	2012
ZipBooks	American Fork	Accounting software	2015
Zions Borgor	Salt Lake City	Financial services	1873

== Companies formerly based in Utah ==
Name	City	Industry	Formed
A Different Drum	Smithfield	Music	1996
Allegiance	Lehi	Enterprise feedback management	2005
AlphaGraphics	Salt Lake City	Printing	1969
Authorize.Net	American Fork	Payment gateway	1996
Bookcraft	Salt Lake City	Book publishing	1942
ColcaSac	Salt Lake City	Computer protective sleeves	2004
Deseret Manufacturing Company	Salt Lake City	Sugar refinery	1851
DeviceLogics	Lindon	Software	2002
Eat Sleep Play	Salt Lake City	Video game development	2007
Fusion-io	Cottonwood Heights	Computer hardware, software	2005
Heritage Internet Technologies	Provo	Web design, web hosting	2001
Huntsman Corporation	Salt Lake City	Chemicals	1970
Kynetx	Lehi	Digital identity	2007
Miche Bag Company	South Jordan	Handbags	2005
MonaVie	Salt Lake City	Dietary supplements	2005
Mrs. Fields	Cottonwood Heights	Baked goods	1977
Naartjie	Salt Lake City	Clothing	1898
NextPage	Lehi	Information technology	1999
Nikola Motor Company	Salt Lake City	Hybrid electric truck manufacturing	2014
Novell	Provo	Software	1979
Scott & Welch	Salt Lake City	Architecture	1914
ScuttlePad	Orem	Social networking service	2010
Skaggs Companies	Salt Lake City	Retail	1915
Snelgrove's Ice Cream	Salt Lake City	Ice cream	1929
Sunn Classic Pictures	Park City	Motion pictures	1971
Sunrider	Orem	Dietary supplements	1982
Thiokol	Ogden	Aerospace engineering	1929
US Synthetic	Orem	Industrial diamond manufacturing	1978
Überplay (Defunct)	St. George	Board games	2003
Utah Parks Company	Cedar City	Tourism	1923
Vehix	Salt Lake City	Automotive research	2008
Venafi	Salt Lake City	Computer security	2000
Village Bancorporation	St. George	Banking	1996
WakeUpNow	Provo, Utah	Self improvement	2009
XanGo	Lehi	Dietary supplements	2002
