= Silicon Slopes =

Marketing slogan describing Utah's technology sector

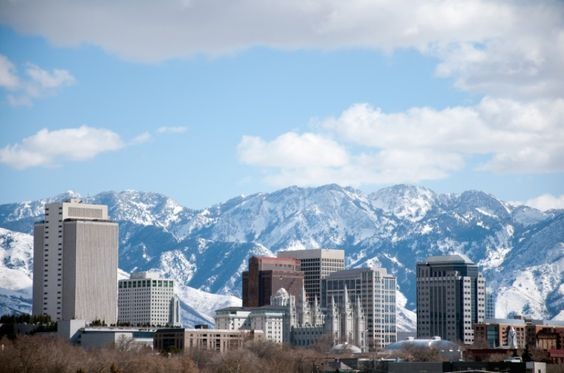
Salt Lake City winter skyline

Silicon Slopes is a term that describes the part of Utah, in the western United States, that is a major economic center for technology and innovation businesses. Centered on the cities of Salt Lake City and Provo and their surrounding suburbs, it corresponds roughly to the geographical area of the Wasatch Front. With the area's largest tech sector agglomeration currently being in and around Lehi, which is located roughly halfway in between those two major cities. Sources have cited factors such as the talent pipeline from local universities and the area's proximity to Silicon Valley via the nearby Salt Lake City International Airport as contributors to its employment and startup growth.

The region encompasses a cluster of information technology, software development, and hardware manufacturing and research firms along the Wasatch Front. Some of the better-known companies with facilities at Silicon Slopes are memory process technology companies SanDisk and the previous Intel/Micron Technology joint venture IM Flash Technologies (since sold to Texas Instruments), e-commerce company eBay, data analysis software firm Adobe Systems, and banking and technology services company Zions Bank.

The largest locally headquartered companies within Northern Utah's growing tech sector include Qualtrics, Domo, Evans & Sutherland, WordPerfect, and Novell. The latter three, along with the University of Utah School of Computing (which was one of the original ARPANET nodes and where CGI was largely first developed), helped birth the state's tech industry from the 1960s to the 1980s.

== Etymology ==
The term Silicon Slopes originated when Josh James (founder and CEO of Domo) created a brand campaign to promote Utah's growing technology community. The nickname is derived from "Silicon Valley," substituting Utah's mountains (slopes) for Northern California's Santa Clara Valley.

== History ==
Historically, the region had been home to a state prison and farmland and little else. Utah's decades-long history of government contract work and innovative Utah businesses' early involvement in the tech industry include the creation of the Internet as the fourth node of ARPANET. These foundations were built over years, and established Utah's ability to become a leading technology center. Utah also has a strong Internet backbone; it was a Google Fiber early expansion city with service now available in Provo and Salt Lake City as well.

=== Local tech businesses ===
Examples of early local tech businesses and founders that helped attract more start-ups to the area include: Evans & Sutherland, founded in Salt Lake City by David Evans and Ivan Sutherland in 1968, as the world's first computer graphics company (in operation for over four decades supplying advanced computer graphics technologies to the market); David C. Evans, founder and first chairman of the University of Utah School of Computing from 1965 to 1973; James H. Clark, founder of Silicon Graphics, Inc; John Warnock, a co-founder of Adobe Systems; Alan Ashton, co-founder of Wordperfect; Edwin Catmull, co-founder of Pixar.

The Utah tech scene started with WordPerfect and Novell in 1979. Novell, Inc., a software development company founded in 1979 by Ray Noorda, produced software to connect desktop computers so they could share peripheral devices, like a printer (computing) and hard disks. As the price of desktop computers began to fall, Novell captured a large segment of the market with its Netware program. At their height in the early 1990s, Novell controlled 65% of the market for network operating systems in the high-tech industry.

A second tech wave in Utah came in the 1990s, based on the founding of Omniture. During that same period, the 2002 Winter Olympics raised the profile of Utah on the world stage. The 2009 acquisition of Omniture by Adobe in 2009 for $1.8 billion led Adobe to establish a permanent presence in Utah.

=== Past political leadership ===
Governor Michael Leavitt (1993–2003) was instrumental in luring many tech companies to Utah. During his time in office, Leavitt made monthly trips to Silicon Valley and used his slogan, "We have workers, we have space, we have proximity," to increase his influence there. He specifically highlighted the challenges facing the Silicon Valley region: natural geographic boundaries and traffic congestion. Utah, he maintained, was the place to grow with ease. Leavitt was a key factor in enticing eBay to locate their main customer service center in Utah and in bringing in new research operations for Intel. Governor Leavitt laid the groundwork for his successors to build on his achievements and continue to make Utah a business-friendly state, particularly for high-tech companies.

=== Government partnerships ===
Utah has a long history of partnerships with the U.S. Department of Defense that have contributed to laying the groundwork for the state's high-tech business environment and infrastructure. David C. Evans, a native of Salt Lake City, was one of the original pioneers of computer science in Utah and its groundbreaking work with the DoD. During the early 1960s, Evans worked as the head of the computer science department at the University of California at Berkeley, where he was also in charge of the university's work for the Pentagon's Advanced Research Project Agency (ARPA). In 1965, Evans was recruited back to Salt Lake City to create a computer science department at the University of Utah, and brought DoD contacts with him, including Ivan Sutherland. Evans and Sutherland continued their work on ARPA for the DoD with their colleagues in California and helped to establish ARPANET, an "early packet switching network and the first network to implement the protocol suite TCP/IP." Both of these technologies form the technical foundation of the internet. In 1969, the University of Utah was one of the original four nodes of ARPANET, cementing its place in military and technological history.

Due to this early partnership with the DoD, Utah was able to encourage more joint ventures with the military. Not only was Utah capable of developing high-tech infrastructure, but many geographic and natural characteristics were appealing to the DoD. Utah is geographically isolated from both the east and the west coasts, providing higher security and less vulnerability to attacks. Utah also has a low probability of large-scale natural disasters and wide open spaces that provide enough room for chemical weapons testing and drone pilot training.

Some notable Utah partnerships with the U.S. military include Hill Air Force Base, Utah Test and Training Range, Dugway Proving Ground, and the Tooele Chemical Agent Disposal Facility.

In the recent years, Utah has also become home to a growing number of big data processing centers. Some of these are government partnerships, such as the largest NSA data storage facility in the United States, located in Bluffdale, Utah. In order to meet the demand and facilitate more partnerships, the University of Utah recently added a new Big Data certificate program within its School of Computing. The program began in the fall of 2014. Utah is already ahead of the curve in the national trend on big data, and training students how to understand the technicality of big data analysis will continue to attract business and military operations to Utah.

=== Banking history ===
Utah's economic stability is also reflected in its history as a center for industrial banks and as a secondary financial hub for investment banks like Goldman Sachs that encourage venture capitalism in the state. Industrial banks, also known as industrial loan corporations (ILCs), are a niche form of banking that is nearly exclusively located in Utah. Examples of Utah ILCs include BMW Bank, Pitney Bowes Bank, Optum Bank, and Target Bank. Due to this distinction, Utah is the fourth-largest center for state-chartered banking in the nation, with nearly $280 billion in assets within its borders.

Utah's industrial banks began in the early 1900s before Congress passed the Bank Holding Company Act of 1956, which severed the ties between banking and commercial corporations. Utah's ILCs were grandfathered in, so Utah's industrial-bank charter is not subject to the Bank Holding Company Act. This means that the ILCs are not regulated by the Federal Reserve; they are overseen by the FDIC and Utah's Department of Financial Services. This allows the banks to be free from more onerous federal regulation and also allows them to be more responsive to changes in the economy. By providing sound oversight in this area of banking, Utah has built credibility in the marketplace and earned a distinguished reputation in banking. This has helped to create the pro-business climate that is attractive to venture capitalists and start-up technology companies.

Evidence of the prominence of the Silicon Slopes tech industry is the growing amount of venture capital coming into the area. In the first nine months of 2014, the dollar-per-deal average in the Silicon Slopes was the highest in the country, at an average of $51.3 million per deal. This high average can be attributed to big deals with key players such as Qualtrics and Domo. Qualtrics, a customer analytics software firm, was acquired for 8 billion dollars by SAP.

== Economy ==
Utah has often been ranked as one of the top five states for businesses. There is a continuous focus on creating partnerships between businesses, government, education, and communities. The Governor's Office of Economic Development is based on Governor Gary Herbert's commitment to economic development statewide. In the most recent State New Economy Index, performed by the Kauffman Foundation in 2010, Utah was ranked first in the nation for Economic Dynamism and inventor patents, while ranking third in fastest-growing firms.

=== Notable companies ===
Notable companies with locations in the Silicon Slopes region include:

- 1-800 Contacts
- Amazon
- Adobe
- Ancestry.com
- Authorize.Net
- Backcountry
- BambooHR
- Cisco
- doTerra
- Bluehost
- Control4
- DevMountain
- DigiCert
- Domo
- eBay
- eFileCabinet
- Engineering Animation
- Facebook
- Gen Digital (formerly Symantec)
- Guitar Center
- HealthEquity
- Henry Schein (Formally Dentrix)
- Instructure
- Intermountain Health Care
- Ivanti (formerly LANDESK)
- LexisNexis
- Lingotek
- Micron Technology
- Microsoft
- MyHeritage
- MokiMobility
- Nature's Sunshine
- OpenText (formerly NOVELL)
- Northrop Grumman
- Nu Skin
- Oracle
- Overstock
- Pluralsight
- Podium
- Proofpoint
- Qualtrics
- SanDisk
- SirsiDynix
- StubHub
- SUSE
- Sunrun
- Texas Instruments
- UnitedHealth Group
- Usana
- Venafi
- Visa
- Vivint
- Wayfair
- Workday
- Workfront
- Xactware
- Zions Bank

=== Economic development ===
Utah's economic stability has grown to meet the standards of the tech giants that occupy the Silicon Slopes area. This was made possible in 2009 by Governor Gary Herbert who focused on four cornerstones to strengthen the economy of Utah: jobs, energy, education and self-determination. Governor Herbert credits the economic momentum in Utah to collaborate between corporate and government partnerships. The Governor's Office of Economic Development, led by Spencer P. Eccles, coordinated with Governor Herbert to build on the economic development cornerstones, calling it economic development 2.0. The updated objectives to help sustain the economic growth in Utah, allowing the Silicon Slope regions to expand, strengthen, and grow existing Utah businesses, increase innovation, entrepreneurship and investment, national and international business, and prioritize education to develop the workforce of the future.

== Demographics ==
=== Location, climate and geography ===
Utah's location is enticing to both companies and employees. With close proximity to the Rocky Mountains, many activities are available year-round. Four distinct seasons offer such year-round activities as skiing, hiking, and rock climbing. Utah also has many national parks, including Zion National Park, Bryce Canyon National Park, and Canyonlands National Park. Salt Lake City is a Delta Air Lines hub and is perfectly situated to allow for business day trips from Silicon Valley due to direct, 90-minute flights that cut travel expenses and limit travel time.

Utah offers many incentives that are more attractive than other cities in the Western region: the cost of living is lower than in Seattle or Portland; the climate is not as hot as Phoenix or Albuquerque; geographic proximity is closer than Austin, allowing for less travel time and cost; and the ski slopes can be reached in less than an hour, unlike Denver.

=== Schools partnerships ===
Universities and high schools in the area have worked on expanding computer science programs in response to the growth of Silicon Slopes. In the early 2000s, the Utah Legislature allocated around $100 million to the state's universities in order to bolster their computer science programs and significantly increase the number of graduates in the field. The universities also provided matching funding and created many new courses and areas of technological study. In October 2021 the University of Utah announced a $15 million donation from the John Price family to construct a new $120 million computer science building. Around the same time Utah Valley University received a $25 million donation from Ryan Smith for its computer science program. Combined the University of Utah and UVU have about 3,400 computer science students. In fall 2019 UVU began offering a tech management MBA in partnership with Silicon Slopes.

As of August 2015, high schools students in Utah are allowed to count a Computer Science course as one of three science classes needed for graduation.

=== Infrastructure ===
A key contributor to Silicon Slopes' tech industry is the Internet infrastructure planning. Salt Lake City is in a suitable geographic location because it sits along the major east-west Internet corridor where ten major service providers interconnect with each other and deliver high-speed services to the area. This "internet backbone" is a critical aspect of Utah's high-tech industry success.

In Provo, the city government started planning a fiber-optic Internet infrastructure in the late 1990s. This high-speed Internet system was funded as a private-public partnership called iProvo and construction was completed in 2006. Google Fiber later acquired iProvo in 2013 and now offers Internet speeds up to 1,000 Mbit/s for businesses and households.

In response to the high-tech industry located in Salt Lake City and its relationship with Provo, Google officially announced in March 2015 that Salt Lake City would be one of the next places to receive Google Fiber. Construction is currently ongoing, but significant progress has been made, and residents and businesses will soon be able to sign-up for lightning-fast internet service. Requests for business permits in the area have drastically increased in response to the soon-to-be-available service.

== Corporate recruitment ==
The State of Utah has offered a variety of incentives to encourage large tech companies to call Utah home. The Utah Governor's Office of Economic Development allows a variety of grants and tax incentives to companies willing to either relocate or expand their enterprise, depending on the stability of the company and the types of jobs that are being brought to the state.

In 2019, Forbes ranked Utah as the third best state for business, and in 2021 U.S. News & World Report ranked Utah as the state with the top economy. In both 2014 and 2015 Utah was the best performing state in the Chamber of Commerce Enterprising States project, and was ranked in the top 10 for economic performance and all five major policy areas. In 2014 Utah was ranked sixth or better in all six categories.

=== Corporation requirements ===
To qualify for the tax benefits or grant programs associated with the Silicon Slopes region, there are specific guidelines in place to determine if the state will offer incentives to encourage relocation. These incentives are evaluated on a case-by-case basis by the Governor's Office and the Executive Director. Some of these standards include the industry the company is in, historical successes of the company, revenues that are raised and the types of jobs that were created. The jobs that are being brought in need to require specific qualifications and maintain certain salaries to maintain a well-educated, professional workforce within the state. To monitor these qualifications, grants and tax credits are only awarded after each corporation has proven its ability to provide the jobs and revenue required.

== See also ==
- Places with "Silicon" names
