= HIT Humanitarian =

US-based non-profit organization

HIT Humanitarian is a 501(c)3 charitable organization established in 2009 by Heritage Internet Technologies (HIT), a Utah-based IT/web-hosting company (formerly known as Heritage Web Solutions). It was formed in response to donations being made by the company and its employees to support humanitarian efforts around the globe. The organization's primary purpose is to provide funding and resources to communities and organizations in effort to reduce malnutrition and disease, develop clean-water and clean-energy sources, build educational and health-care infrastructure, and encourage self-sustaining practices. HIT Humanitarian also provides deeply discounted web design services for non-profit, charitable, and other organizations that offer beneficial services to their communities.

In 2009, HIT donated $27,778.25 through employee donations and company-matched contributions. The donations have been used to support partnerships HIT has made with non-profit and charitable organizations that operate in Nepal and Haiti. As part of its efforts to provide web development services to qualifying organizations, HIT Humanitarian has also developed two programs, HIT Heart and HIT Angels.

== Adopting a Nepalese Village ==
In 2008, HIT became part of Utah-based [CHOICE Humanitarian's] Corporate Village Partnership and began providing money and resources to assist in ongoing projects in the Nepalese village of Puranokot.

HIT co-founder Brad Stone established a connection with the village while traveling to Nepal with members of CHOICE Humanitarian to assist in a village school-building project. Stone said the experience instilled in him a desire to help in a way that villagers could gain tools and knowledge to improve their community. "I learned I wasn't there for [myself]," he said. "I was there to support those villagers. It's helped me to get a greater appreciation and outlook. It's not about giving handouts, it's about helping villagers learn and grow."

Since it began working with the Nepalese village, HIT has worked with CHOICE Humanitarian to assist in building a school, a health center, digging irrigation canals for clean water and building simple biogas digesters to provide clean-burning fuel.

== Adopting an Orphanage in Haiti ==
In 2009, HIT officially began to sponsor Hope for Little Angels in Haiti, an orphanage based in Port-au-Prince, Haiti. CEO David Aitken first established ties with the orphanage after he and his wife were referred to the orphanage while investigating the process of adopting children. Aitken made an initial visit to the orphanage in November 2008, which had a profound impact on him. "I witnessed people that were living in the most desperate conditions, where food and water are a constant battle," he said. "Children are dying from starvation and people constantly get sick from something as simple as a glass of water that is often filled from filthy gutters."

With Aitken's encouragement, HIT formally adopted the orphanage a month later. Employees began voluntarily donating portions of their paychecks—their donations being matched by the company, which also pays administrative costs—to fund most of the orphanage's food, clothing, medical, and clean water needs.

A 7.0 earthquake rocked Haiti on January 12, 2010 while the orphanage was in the process of relocating from its original location in Carrefour to a larger facility in Port-au-Prince. Both the new and old facilities were destroyed in the earthquake, but miraculously, all of the orphanage's 68 children were found alive and safe after several tense days of searching. As a result of Haiti's devastation, United States Secretary of Homeland Security Janet Napolitano opened up restrictions to dramatically speed the adoption of Haitian orphans, allowing Aitken to bring his three adopted children to Utah in February 2010.

The company is currently assisting the dozens of orphans still there. As of March 2010, it donates around $4,500 each month to the orphanage.

== HIT Heart ==
In addition to supplying tangible funds and resources, HIT Humanitarian established the HIT Heart program in April 2008 to provide heavily discounted web design services for non-profit and charitable organizations that provide positive contributions to their communities. Qualifying recipients can receive 40-100 percent of the service free.

== HIT Angels ==
This program was started to provide heavily discounted web design for businesses or individuals who have been nominated by Heritage Internet Technologies associates and who cannot afford the full cost of design but have a special need to develop their site.
