= Miche =

Miche may refer to:

- Miche (bag), a handbag company
- Miche (bread), a type of Pain de campagne
- Miche (company), an Italian bicycle company
- Miche (cycling team)
- Miche (footballer), Spanish footballer (1935–2014)
- Miche (horse), an Argentinian Thoroughbred racehorse
- Miche, a system of self-reconfiguring modular robot
- Miche, a pin used in the sport of León bowls, a variation of Basque bowls
- Miche (film), a 1932 French film

== See also ==
- Grand Duke Michael Mikhailovich of Russia, known within his family as "Miche-Miche"
