= Asea =

Asea may refer to:

- ASEA (American company), a direct selling and marketing company
- African Securities Exchanges Association or African Stock Exchanges Association, an alliance of African exchanges
- ASEA, a former Swedish industrial company, now part of ABB
- Asea, Greece, a village in Arcadia, Greece
- Asea (Arcadia), a town of ancient Arcadia, Greece

== See also ==
- Asia (disambiguation)
