= Central Bank (Utah) =

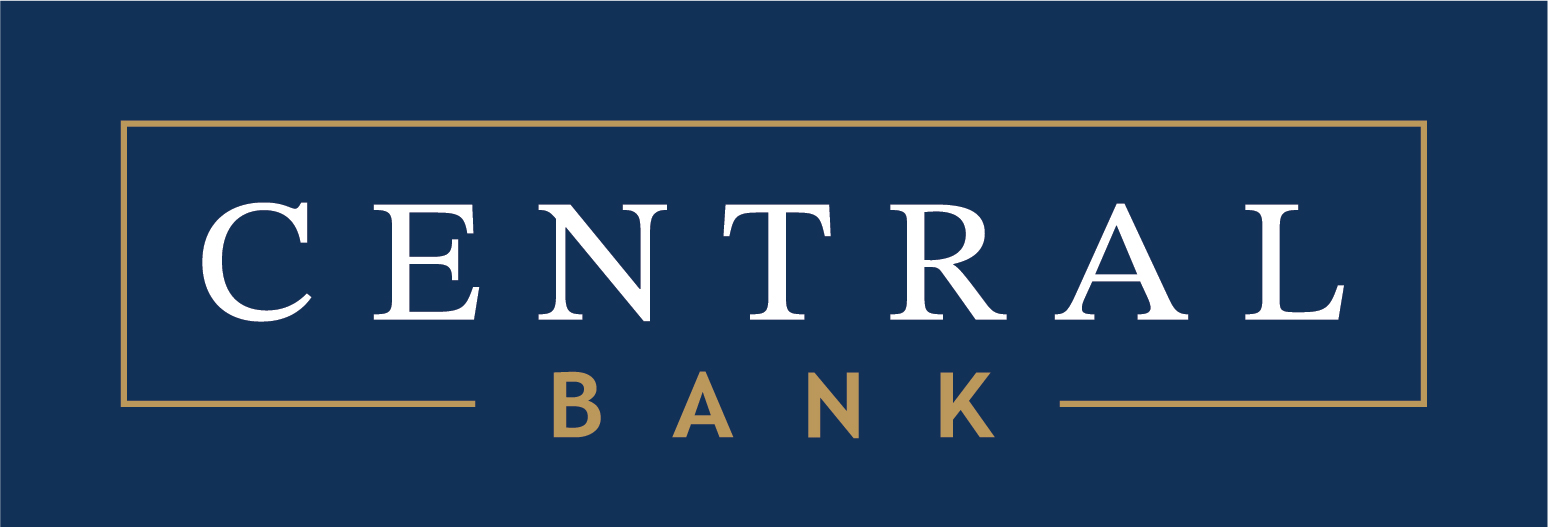
Central Bank

Central Bank (formally Central Bank and Trust Co.) is a privately owned chartered bank in Utah, United States, established in 1891. The bank operates ten locations, all in Utah County.

== History ==
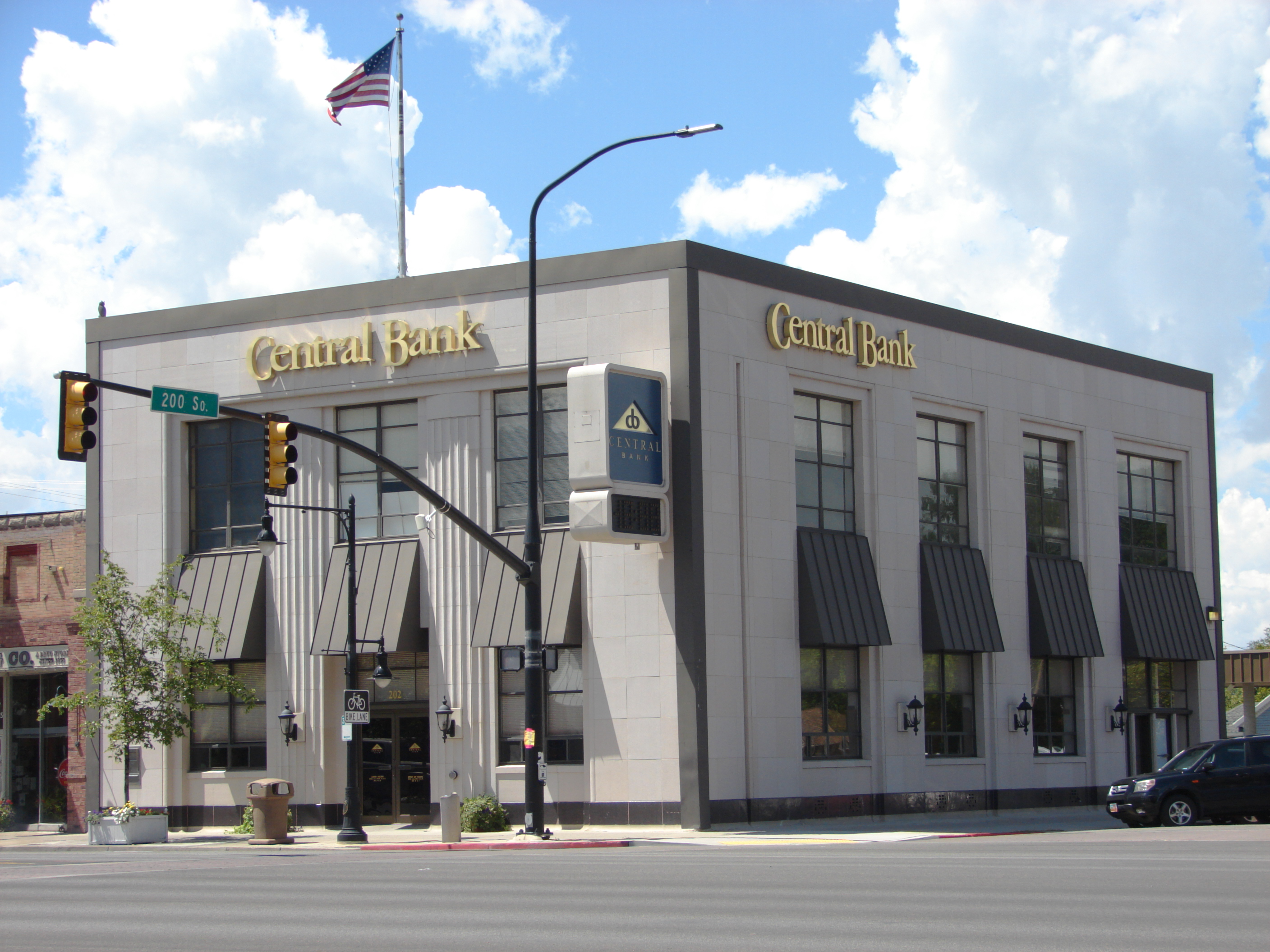
Original Central Bank building in Springville, Utah, August 2015

Central Bank started out as the Springville Banking Company, established in 1891. Until 1890, the local townsfolk of Springville, Utah stored their gold at the Packard Brother's store, Deal Brothers and Mendenhall Company, or H.T. Reynolds and Company. These stores thought that it would be wise to establish a bank, for security reasons. Central Bank was formed when the State Bank of Provo merged with Springville Banking Co. in 1966.

== See also ==
- List of Utah companies
