= Bask Technology =

Remote tech support company in Lehi, Utah

Bask Technology, Inc.
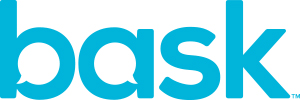
- Industry: Technical Support
- Founded: 2004
- Headquarters: Orem, Utah, United States
- Area served: North America
- Key people: Sridhar Santhanam (CEO)
- Brands: Bask, Digity
- Services: Technical support and advising
- Number of employees: 202
- Website: bask.com

Bask Technology, Inc. (formerly known as iTOK, Inc.) is a remote tech support and advising company based in Lehi, Utah, within the area known as Silicon Slopes. Founded in 2004 by Seth Bailey and Sean Miller, Bask provides third-party support for a variety of technology services and software via secure remote computer connection. The company has over 50,000 members and 200 employees, including its Technology Advisors, who are based in the United States and receive certification and training.

== Products and services ==
Bask uses a subscription-based model where members pay a monthly fee for technology products. Products include online identity protection, cloud-based data backup, and antivirus software. The company partners with brands such as Avira and Trend Micro to offer these products as part of a monthly subscription package.

Bask also operates a small business brand called Digity, which focuses on micro-businesses and entrepreneurs.

== Performance ==
Bask was reviewed by Michael Muchmore of PC Mag, who published an article on the service in April 2014, when it was still known as iTOK. "iTOK offers good technical support, and throws in security protection and online backup, but it's on the pricey side." It was given a 3.5-star rating.
Bask is accredited by the Better Business Bureau (BBB) since April 2013, with an A+ rating.

== Investment ==
In July 2014, Bask received its Series B funding from ABS Capital Partners, in the amount of $18 million. Signal Peak Ventures has also invested in the company.

== Management ==
In April 2015, founder Seth Bailey stepped down from the position of CEO and transitioned to the position of Chief Strategy Officer. James P. Dunn replaced him as the CEO of Bask. Former CSO Bailey is a regular contributor to Entrepreneur, and his op-ed piece "The right to high-speed Internet" was published by CNBC.

In early 2016, Dunn was replaced by Zane Bennett as CEO. He was joined by Phil Fraher as the company President and CFO.

== Rebrand ==
In October 2015, iTOK, Inc. changed its legal name to Bask Technology, Inc. Its consumer brand iTOK was rebranded to Bask.

== Surveys ==
Bask conducts surveys within its senior-aged member base about a variety of technology topics. These surveys have been referenced in the news media, including Forbes, Telecompetitor, Debt.com, and The Huffington Post. As a result, former VP of Marketing Andrew Parker was interviewed by Yahoo! Tech and PBS platform Next Avenue to provide expertise on the senior technology market.
