= John Bresee =

John Stuart Bresee (February 21, 1966 – June 29, 2019) was a Utah-based entrepreneur and co-founder of Backcountry.com, as well as a writer, editor, and entrepreneur coach.

== Early life and education ==
Bresee was raised in Vermont, one of five children; his obituary described his parents as having left a more conventional upper-class upbringing in New York and Virginia to raise their family on a rural property in Vermont. After high school he spent a year at the Sterling School in Vermont before graduating from Johnson State College (now Northern Vermont University). He was a competitive freestyle skier in the ballet skiing discipline and taught skiing at Stowe Mountain Resort in Vermont before moving to Alta and then Salt Lake City, Utah.

== Career ==
=== Business ===
While working at Snowbird Resort, Bresee and Jim Holland sought to lease retail space from the resort to open an avalanche-gear store; after resort owner Les Otten declined, the pair launched the business online instead, co-founding Backcountry.com in 1996, one of the first internet-based outdoor gear retailers, while living in Park City, Utah. Bresee later served as president of Backcountry.com before Liberty Media and John C. Malone acquired the company in 2007. When Jill Layfield was promoted to Backcountry.com CEO in February 2011 and Holland became executive chairman, Bresee moved into an advisory role with the company.

He was also director of e-commerce for Cellmania, a Silicon Valley mobile-commerce infrastructure company funded by Motorola, which he joined a few years after his time at Powder. Cellmania was acquired by Research in Motion (now Blackberry) in 2010.

Bresee had previously registered the domain name backcountryaccess.com; he later gave it to Bruce Edgerly and Bruce McGowan, co-founders of the avalanche-safety company Backcountry Access, in exchange for a snow shovel.

=== Writer and editor ===
Bresee founded The Wasatch Canyon Reporter, a Wasatch Range skiing newsletter, while working at Snowbird Resort. He later served as editor of Powder Magazine from 1998 to 1999. Additionally, his work has appeared in Skiing, Outside, Newsweek, and Gravity.

== Personal life ==
Bresee had two children. He died in his sleep on June 29, 2019, of a suspected diabetic cardiac arrest following a 180-mile motocross ride across the Utah desert the previous day.
