= D. Gary Young =

American alternative medicine businessman (1949–2018)

- Born: July 11, 1949; Idaho Falls, Idaho, US
- Died: May 12, 2018 (aged 68); Salt Lake City, Utah, US
- Occupation: Former CEO of Young Living
- Website: www.dgaryyoung.com

Donald Gary Young (July 11, 1949 – May 12, 2018) was an American businessman who specialized in essential oils and alternative medicine. He was the co-founder and chief executive officer (CEO) of Young Living, a Utah-based multi-level marketing company that sells essential oils and dietary supplements. Early in his career, Young pleaded guilty to the unlicensed practice of medicine, and his company has faced several government investigations.

== Early life and education ==
Young was born on July 11, 1949, in Idaho Falls, Idaho, to Donald Norman Young and Dolly Adrienne Parsons. The family was poor and lived on an 80-acre ranch in the foothills near Challis, Idaho; they were practicing Mormons. For the first few years of his life, the family lived in a small, one-room cabin without running water or electricity. He was the second-oldest of six living children (an older sister died in infancy), Young attended public school and graduated from Challis High School in 1967.

After graduating, Young briefly worked for the U.S. Forest Service and then moved to Canada with the intention of homesteading in British Columbia. By Young's account, at the age of 24, he suffered a near-fatal logging accident, and had to use a wheelchair for a time, and he further claimed that while rehabilitating, he began to experiment with essential oils. According to Young's wife, he tried to kill himself three times while recovering from the accident.

According to Business Insider, in December 1973, "after completing a home-study course in nutrition and herbology, he went back to work as a part-time trucker in British Columbia and pursued odd jobs over the next few years", hauling cargo and working on a pipeline in Fairbanks, Alaska. In 1979, Young enrolled at the Burroughs Vita-Flex Institute, "an unaccredited school dedicated to the teachings of Stanley Burroughs".

From 1979 to 1981, Young attended Donsbach Nutrition University, an unaccredited school in Huntington Beach, California operated by Kurt Donsbach, an unlicensed chiropractor. In 1980, Young enrolled in a therapeutic massage program at the “American Institute of Physiogenerology”; however, according to the institute's founder, Young left after attending only a few classes, doing a third of the homework, and owing an unpaid debt for tuition. In the early 1980s, Young spent a quarter-semester at Spokane Community College. He claimed to have earned a doctorate degree in naturopathy in 1985 from Bernadean University, an unaccredited school described as a “mail-order diploma mill”.

== Career ==
In 1982, Young opened a clinic in Spokane, Washington, which offered unlicensed medical services, including childbirth. In 1983, Young was the subject of a joint undercover investigation launched by the Spokane Police Department and the state of Washington. During the course of the investigation, Young offered to deliver a baby, and he claimed that he could detect cancer with a blood test and treat the disease. He was subsequently arrested and charged with practicing medicine without a license, to which he ultimately pleaded guilty. Young was fined $250, given a 60-day suspended sentence, and placed on probation for one year. He was also ordered not to engage in the practice of medicine in Washington and not to violate similar licensing laws in other states.

In 1986 while promoting himself as a naturopathic doctor, Young was operating the Rosarita Beach Clinic in Tijuana, Mexico, offering "detoxification" for cancer and lupus using treatments whose efficacy was questioned in an investigative report by the Los Angeles Times. To test the veracity of Young's clinical diagnosis, a reporter submitted cat and chicken blood to a clinic employee, who failed to determine that the samples were non-human, and further diagnosed that the "patient" had an aggressive form of cancer and liver disease. Young also founded and operated the Young Life Wellness Center, a medical clinic in Chula Vista, California, which in 1988 was ordered by a court judge to be shut down. That year, a complaint was filed against Young by the State of California, alleging "unfair, deceptive, untrue and misleading advertising and unlawful, unfair and fraudulent business practices" regarding Young's selling and manufacturing of "unapproved medical devices and drugs", and advertising that "he could cure cancer and other diseases".

In 2000, Young opened the Young Life Research Clinic. Located in Springville, Utah, the clinic provided essential oils and alternative therapies to people suffering from a variety of ailments, including depression and cancer. In 2004, the Utah Attorney General charged a clinic employee with practicing medicine without a license for conducting diagnostic tests and prescribing products to patients at Young's clinic between 2000 and 2002. The clinic had also employed a pediatrician whose medical license had previously been suspended by the state medical board following a manslaughter conviction in connection with the improper treatment and death of a cancer patient under his care. In 2005, the clinic settled a lawsuit with a patient who claimed that they were given infusions of vitamin C that caused near-fatal kidney failure. Young then closed the Utah clinic and opened a new one (Nova Vita Medical Clinic) in Guayaquil, Ecuador.

=== Young Living ===
In 1993, Young and his third wife, Mary, founded Young Living Essential Oils in Riverton, Utah, later moving the company to Lehi, Utah. In 2017, Young Living was reported to have become one of the largest vendors of essential oils in the United States with over three million customers. Young stepped down as CEO in 2015, and his third wife, Mary Young, assumed the role.

The company has faced complaints and lawsuits, including safety violations following an inspection into an employee death in 2000, reports to the FDA of adverse product reactions from 2013 to 2014, federal misdemeanor charges after voluntary disclosing illegal trafficking of certain oils in 2017, and a proposed class-action lawsuit alleging that the company is an unlawful pyramid scheme in 2019.

== Personal life ==
Young married Donna Jean Young on October 2, 1968. In 1982, Young and Donna Jean attempted to give birth to a daughter to be named Rachel in a whirlpool bath located in Young's "health club,“ but the child died following the delivery. According to the Spokane county coroner, the child, who was born normal and healthy, died due to oxygen deprivation and would have survived if a hospital delivery had been performed. No criminal charges resulted from the death, but it prompted an investigation into Young's practices. They divorced on September 14, 1983.

Young's second wife was named Dixie. In 1994, Young married his third wife, Mary, a trained opera singer. In addition to his eight children from prior marriages, Gary had two sons with Mary: Jacob and Josef.

Young died on May 12, 2018, in Salt Lake City. His wife Mary announced Young had died due to complications from a series of strokes; however, Young's son Shawn stated that his father had died due to cancer.

== Publications ==
Young authored several self-published books on essential oils and other health-related topics including:

- Young, D. Gary (2014). Ancient Einkorn Today's Staff of Life. Young Living. ISBN 978-0990510000.
- Young, D. Gary (2010). The one gift. Orem, Utah: Wisdom. ISBN 978-0984595907.
- Young, D. Gary (2011). Shutran's Ancient Apothecary. Life Science. ISBN 978-0983518341.
- Young, Gary; Lawrence, Ronald Lawrence; Schreuder, Marc (2005). Discovery of the ultimate superfood: how the Ningxia Wolfberry and four other whole foods help combat heart disease, cancer, chronic fatigue, depression, diabetes and more. Orem, UT: Essential Science. ISBN 978-0943685441.
- Young, D. Gary (2003). Raindrop technique. Essential Science Pub. ISBN 978-0943685366.
- Young, D. Gary (2003). Essential oils integrative medical guide: building immunity, increasing longevity, and enhancing mental performance with therapeutic-grade essential oils (3rd print. ed.). Salem, UT: Essential Science Pub. ISBN 978-0943685342.
- Young, D. Gary (2000). Pregnenolone: a radical new approach to health, longevity, and emotional well-being. Salem, UT: Essential Science Pub. ISBN 978-0943685281.
- Young, D Gary (1999). The Truth Behind Growth Hormone: Its Promise and Its Peril; How to Safely Unlock the Benefits of Growth Hormone. Essential Science. ISBN 9780943685243.
- Young, D. Gary (1999). Longevity secrets: How the Hunza people achieve unsurpassed longevity through diet: the missing link in modern nutrition. Essential Science Publishing. ISBN 978-0943685236.
- Young, D. Gary (1996). Aromatherapy: the essential beginning (2nd ed.). Salt Lake City, UT: Essential Press Pub. ISBN 9780964818705.
