= ColcaSac =

American manufacturer of computer accessories

ColcaSac Inc.
- Formerly: AppleSac
- Company type: Private
- Industry: Protective Equipment Manufacturing
- Founded: 2004
- Defunct: 2014
- Headquarters: Salt Lake City, Utah, United States
- Products: Protective sleeves
- Number of employees: 10 in 2011
- Website: https://colcasac.com

Hemp sleeve

ColcaSac was a Salt Lake City–based company, started in 2004 as AppleSac, that specializes in the making of sleeves specifically for small-format computers and phones. The company started by producing protective sleeves for the Apple MacBook. Due to trademark issues with Apple Inc., the company changed its name from AppleSac to ColcaSac in 2009. It terminated activities in 2014.

Because of a high demand for PC and laptop sleeves, ColcaSac began producing custom sleeves upon request in 2007. The company claims that natural fabrics and earthy colors reduce attractiveness to thieves.

As a company ColcaSac engages in environmentally respectful standards and is a member of 1% for the Planet. By 2010, the company had started producing protective sleeves for a wide variety of hardware beyond the MacBook: Kindle, iPhone, iPod Touch and iPod Classic using material such as hemp fibers.
