= Daynes Music =

American musical instrument retailer

Daynes Music in Midvale, Utah

Daynes Music, located in Midvale, Utah, is the oldest retail business and continuously operated family business in Utah. It is the 76th oldest family-owned business in the country. What began as a small music and jewelry store in a log building in 1862, has grown to be a fourth-generation family business.

== History ==
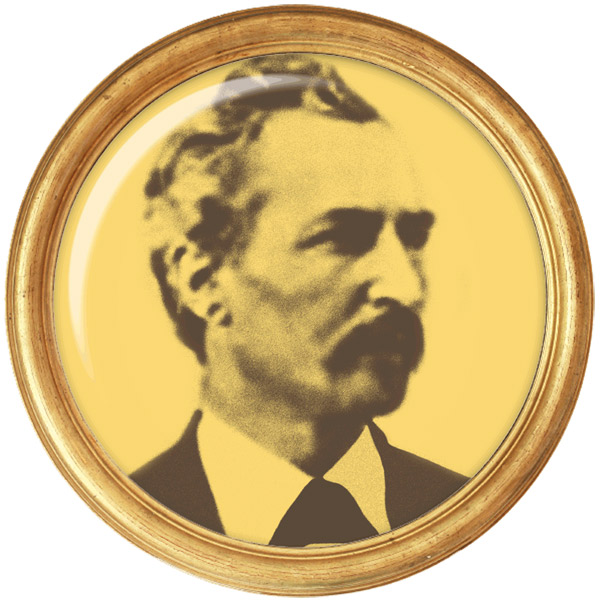
John Daynes, founder of Daynes Music

Founder John Daynes was a native of England, but he and his wife Eliza Miller Daynes and their family converted to the Church of Jesus Christ of Latter-day Saints (LDS Church) and left England in 1862 to travel to the Utah Territory. They brought several instruments with them, including a melodeon, which their 11-year-old son, Joseph J. Daynes, played very well. Joseph grew to be the first organist for the Mormon Tabernacle Choir at age 16, a position he held for 33 years.

John Daynes was a watchmaker by trade, but music was his hobby and passion, and he was able to make it his business in Salt Lake City when he recognized the craving that Mormon pioneers had for music. They had been largely unable to bring instruments with them across the Great Plains.

John convinced Steinway & Sons to ship him one of their pianos in 1873. This piano had to be shipped to San Francisco and then carted over Donner Pass through the Sierra Nevada. This purchase, as well as subsequent purchases from Steinway, makes Daynes Music the oldest Steinway dealership in the United States and the second-oldest music store in the United States.

== Foundation and growth ==
John Daynes ran his business until 1902, when he turned it over to his son Royal W. Daynes. Royal ran the business for 49 years until his son Gerald Daynes became its president in 1950. Current president, Skip Daynes, became president in 1967, and turned Daynes Music from the brink of bankruptcy to a successful business.

The business which has been running for 150 years has had its ups and downs. The company was nearly dissolved after the Great Depression, but Gerald was slowly able to rebuild it. Determination and hard work were still necessary when Skip took over the business and its $97,000 deficit as its fourth-generation owner. It took many rounds of trial and error, determination, and hard work for Skip to get the business back on its feet. He recognized that, "A successful owner is willing to participate on every level of his business." Skip also learned something from his heritage: "If people are in the business simply to make money, they cannot continue a family business. They have to be oriented around service to the community."

In a 2006 Music Inc. article, Skip explained some of the business wisdom he has learned and used over the years including:

- Get a second, disinterested opinion; it can be enlightening.
- Adapt your services and image to the needs of your customers.
- Offer extra services to make return customers out of first customers.
- Donate to and participate in local arts.

== Recent history ==
Daynes Music has had to learn to adapt. Computers and technology have revolutionized the music industry. Skip has noticed that developments in technology have brought instant gratification and cheap instruments to the forefront, rather than pianos. He has noticed in his business that music "stabilizes the family," and by using technology, he has expanded the versatility of pianos, especially with the Story & Clark and QRS Music system of PNOscan. This technology can turn a traditional piano into a teaching tool with almost limitless implications.

PNOscan uses a small optic sensor, installed under the keyboard, to make any piano into a digital piano. Software is available to hook this system up to a computer and turn your piano into a full orchestra, to compose your own music, and to help students expand their music education.

== Community involvement ==
Daynes Music has also been very involved in community arts. In 1940, Royal Daynes helped establish the Utah Philharmonic Symphony (now the Utah Symphony). In 1963, Gerald R. Daynes housed the offices and scenery of the Utah Civic Ballet (now Ballet West). In 1976, Skip Daynes housed the new Utah Opera Company in his store until it grew enough to provide its own facility. Skip also provides both instruments and financial aid to the Grand Teton Music Festival.
