= Saygus =

Saygus Corporation
- Type: Private
- Industry: Telecommunications equipment
- Headquarters: Salt Lake City, Utah, United States
- Area served: Worldwide
- Key people: Roger Yack, President; Chad Sayers, Founder and CEO; Tim Riker, CTO; Sam Fairchild, Senior Advisor
- Products: Smartphones
- Website: www.saygus.com

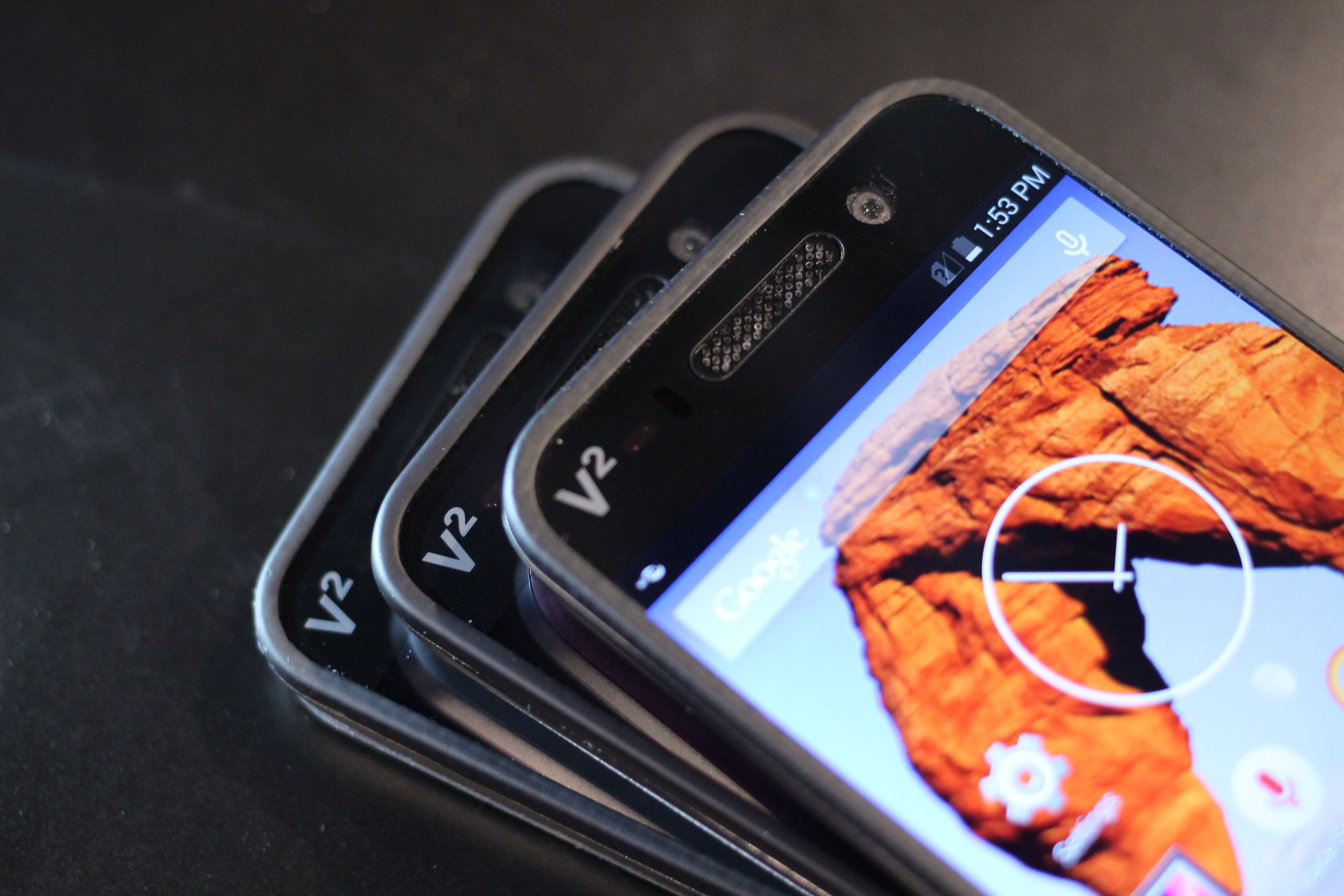

Saygus is an American developer of smartphones headquartered in South Jordan, Utah that was considered fraudulent. It was founded by Chad Sayers.

Saygus purportedly developed two smartphone devices: VPhone and V², neither of which were ever released.

On April 20, 2021, the United States Department of Justice filed a lawsuit in the District of Utah alleging $10 Million in Securities fraud.

On July 15, 2024, Saygus owner Chad Sayers was sentenced to 29 months imprisonment after admitting to defrauding investors. He was ordered to pay $10,250,834.53 in restitution and a forfeiture money judgement in the same amount.

== History ==
Saygus' VPhone, featuring a 3.5 inch touchscreen and slide-out keyboard, was first revealed in 2009, but did not go to market. The VPhone was presented at the 2010 Consumer Electronics Show, winning the Best of Innovations Award in the Wireless Handsets category.

The second device developed by Saygus was named V² (later referred to as V'- but still called the V Squared). The V² smartphone was announced at CES 2015 and was reported to ship in the first quarter of 2015. The device could be pre-ordered directly from Saygus during January 2015.

In June 2015 a crowdfunding campaign was launched for the Saygus V² with the company citing manufacturing issues in delivering the finished product to pre-order customers. In August 2017 it was reported that no devices had been delivered to customers.

== Events ==
- Saygus at CeBIT 2015 presents V² smartphone
- Saygus presents V² at CES 2015
- Saygus presents V² at MWC 2015
- Saygus presents last hardware update of V² at Los Angeles Saygus VIP Penthouse Lounge near E3
