= WakeUpNow =

Defunct American multi-level marketing company

- Founded: 2009; 17 years ago
- Founder: Shaun Goodison
- Defunct: February 16, 2015
- Headquarters: Provo, Utah, United States
- Website: wakeupnow.com

WakeUpNow was a multi-level marketing company based in Provo, Utah, that sold products and services focused on health and financial management. It was founded in 2009 by Troy Muhlestein. The company ceased operations in the United States on February 16, 2015.

== Products ==
WakeUpNow sold products focused around the concept of health and financial management using a multi-level marketing model. Offered products included WUN Fit, Thunder (energy drink), WUN MD (telemedicine), Awaken drinks, WUN Finance (personal financial management), Taxbot (Tax software), WUN Protect (identity theft protection), and Vacation Club (travel discount program).

Truth in Advertising's review of the organization found that some of the products offered by joining its program are available for free or lower cost elsewhere on the Internet and that the organization as of September 2014 has had 160 complaints to the Federal Trade Commission.

== History ==
WakeUpNow was founded in 2009 by Troy Muhlestein.

About 95% of distributors in WakeUpNow failed to make a profit in the program in 2013.

In a letter written by CEO Phil Polich on February 16, 2015, WUN announced it would cease all network marketing operations due to poor management by former CEO Kirby Cochran citing, "his decisions for a privileged few outweighed the incredible heart and dedication of the many". Pyramid scheme expert Robert FitzPatrick has said that WakeUpNow's closure was typical of multi-level marketing companies, and that prior to being ousted Cochran had been presented as a "godlike figure" by the company.
