= BiArtis =

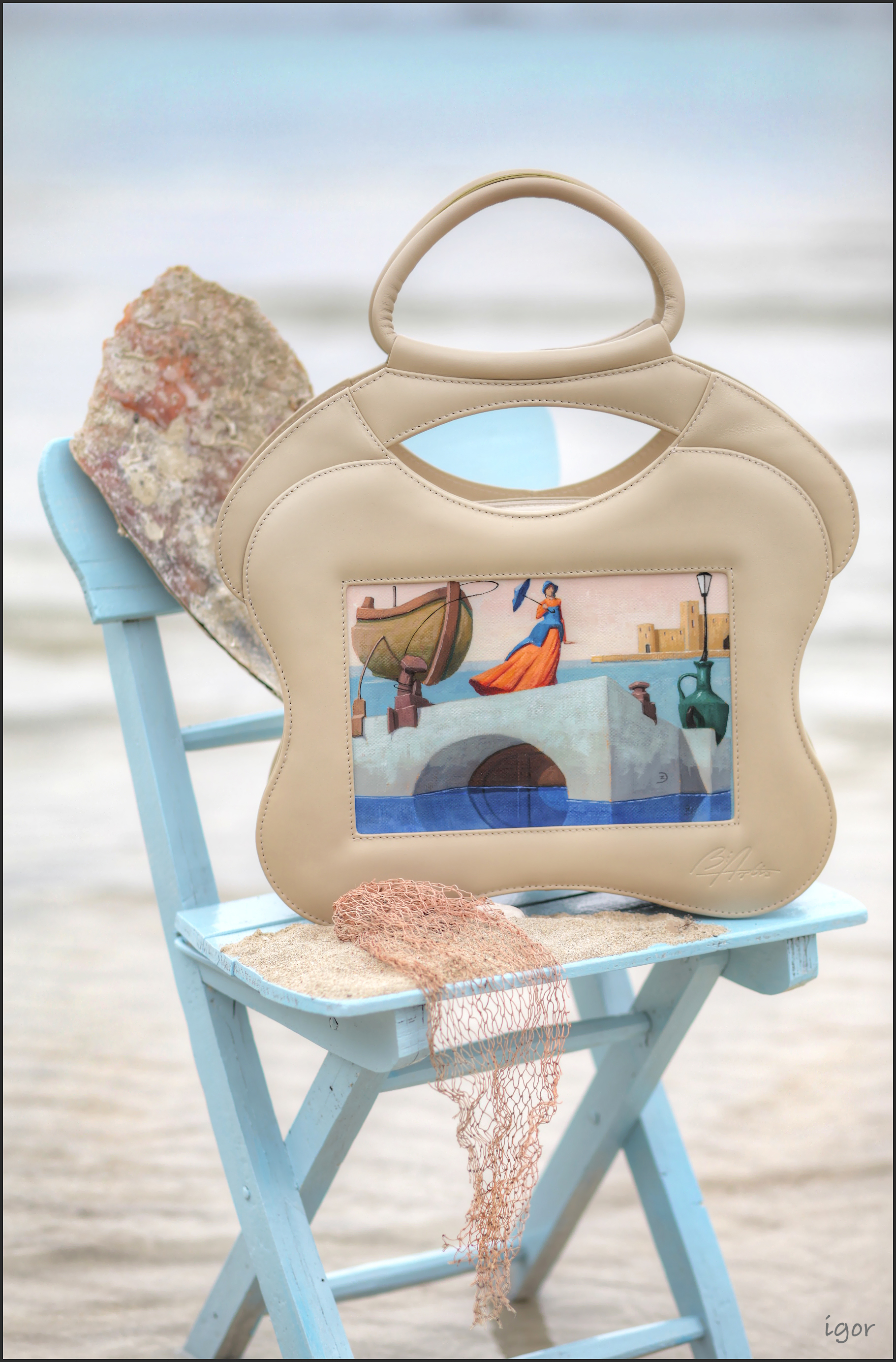
BiArtis handbag model Dalija.

BiArtis is a brand that creates leather bags with oil embroidery on canvas, where the name BiArtis comes from the Greek-Latin word that means "double art".

The bags are designed to be collected as a work of art designed by professional artists. The brand concept assumes the use of a silk scarf with an ornament similar to the one applied to the bag, made by the same author.

== History ==
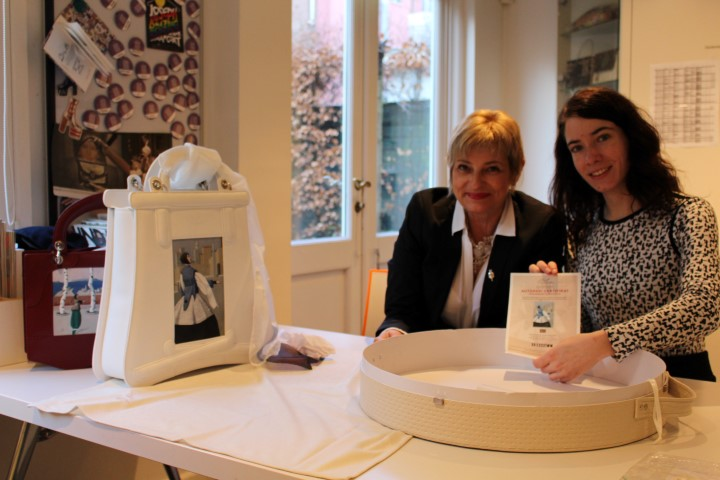
The creator and inventor Elizabeth Suzana Kozina, on the left, with one of her bags.

The creator and inventor of BiArtis bags, Elizabeth Suzana Kozina in the end of 2012, wanted to put art work on something other than walls, so she thought, that she could put painting on a bag.

At the beginning of 2013, she ordered an oil on canvas from an artist and went a factory where they sewed it into a prototype bag. What was created, did not suit her. After many attempts, she found a manufacturer to whom she showed the unacceptable prototype to and asked: "Can you do better than this?" He replied: "Not only I can but I WILL", and that is how BiArtis bag was made.

The first publicly shown BiArtis bag, that satisfied the inventor's criteria, was introduced in May 2015.

== Design ==
- BiArtis bags are sold in 5 different models: Dalia, Talija, Diana, Dalga and Cygnus. Each one may be made to order with different customer-chosen motifs and in one of seven available leather colors.
- Each bag comes with painted silk scarf and the painting uniqueness certificate with a special generated number to protect it against copying and stealing.

== Craftsmanship ==
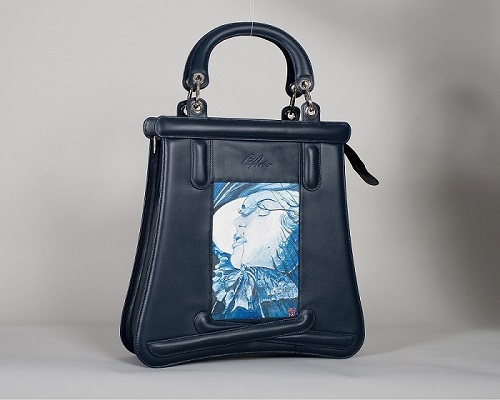
BiArtis handbag model Dalga.

The bags are handmade in Croatia. First blueprint is made, then an artist paints a painting and a scarf. Next thing is choosing the model and color of bag. Painting then is taken to a factory to be combined with the handmade bag. All is done while wearing gloves, because painting is applied in bag, not on it. Then, completed bag is taken to photographer to take photo after which certificate of uniqueness is made.

The bag and certificate is put in exclusive satin bag and white box with declarations.

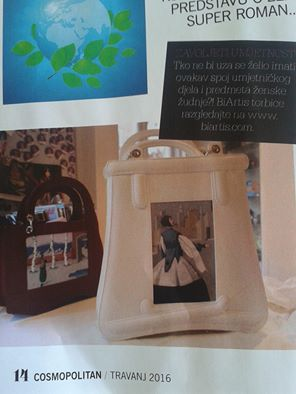
BiArtis handbags featured in Croatian edition of Cosmopolitan magazine

== Demands ==
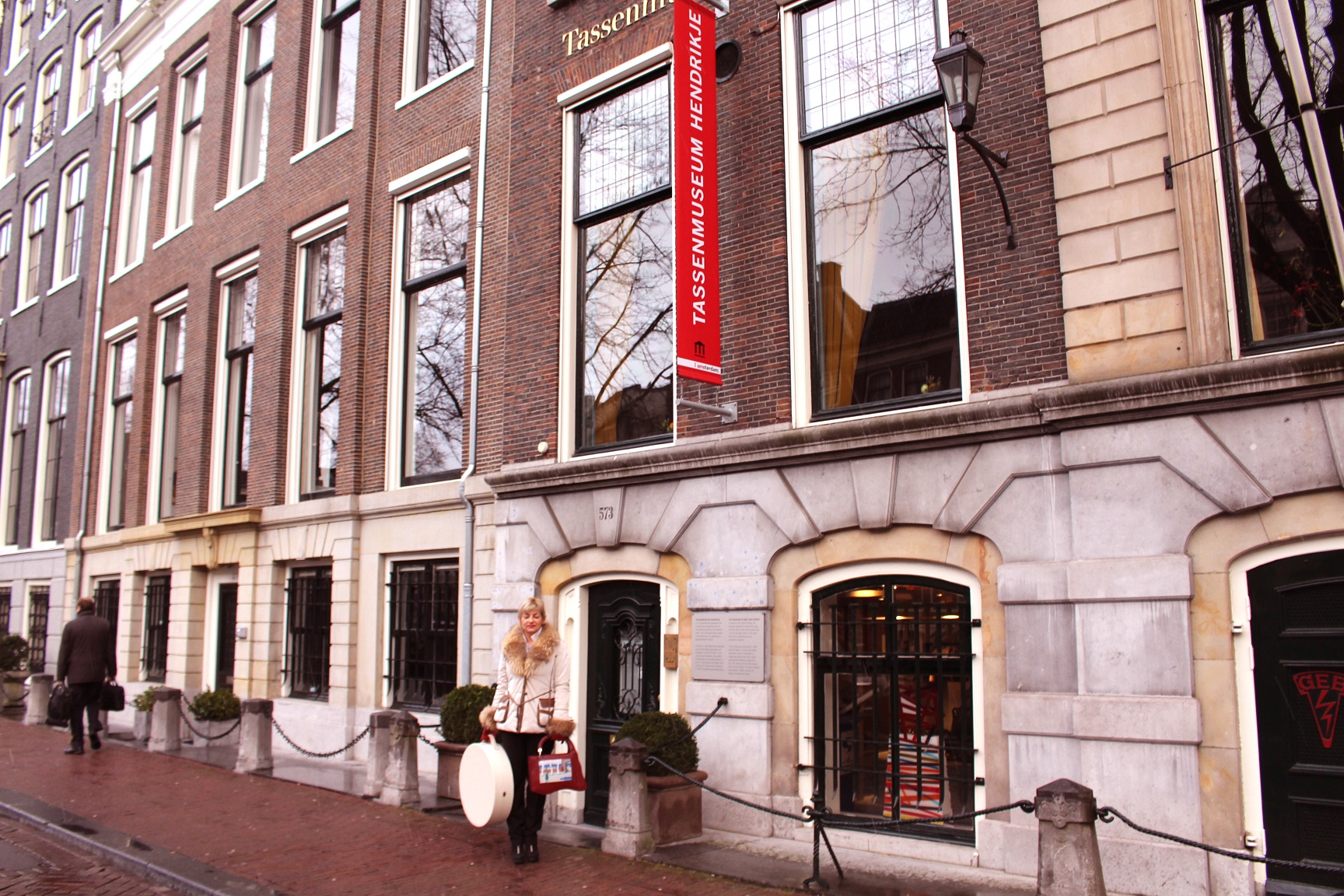
BiArtis bag in front of The Museum of Bags and Purses

The rarity of these bags are purportedly designed to increase demand by collectors of art for as the painting gets older the bag gains more value.

As the result, BiArtis bag is currently in The Museum of Bags and Purses (Dutch: Tassenmuseum Hendrikje), located in Amsterdam, The Netherlands. It is a museum devoted to historic handbags, purses and suitcases. The museum's collection includes 4,000 items dating back to the 16th century and a BiArtis bag is among them.

A BiArtis bag is also presented to buyers on a delivered BiArtis pad and with white BiArtis gloves.
