= Naartjie (clothing retailer) =

Children's clothing retailer

- Industry: Clothing retailer
- Founded: 1989
- Founder: Anne Eales
- Headquarters: Cape Town, South Africa,

Naartjie is a specialty children's clothing retailer founded in 1989 in Cape Town, South Africa by designer Anne Eales. The company has since been acquired by Truworths International. The clothing is made from African cotton.

== History ==
The company previously operated 55 stores located in the United States, and was based in Salt Lake City, Utah, United States. The company's American corporation filed for Chapter 11 bankruptcy protection on September 15, 2013. The Wall Street Journal reported on October 3, 2014 the American store would begin "Going out of business sales."

Previously, there are 22 stores located in South Africa.

Today, the brand is sold online at Truworths, as well as Walmart
