= Christopherson Business Travel =

American travel agency

- Industry: Travel
- Founder: Merrill Christopherson; Lucille Christopherson
- Headquarters: Salt Lake City, Utah, United States
- Key people: Mike Cameron (owner), Camille Cameron (owner)
- Products: AirPortal, AirPortal 360, AirPortal 360 Mobile, SecurityLogic, AirBank, ValueLogic, Airtinerary, Hotel ReCheck, Virtual Pay, Hotel Attachment, Travel Approval
- Revenue: US$687,000,000 (2019)
- Number of employees: 480 (2019)
- Divisions: Andavo Travel, Andavo Meetings & Incentives, CV Humanitarian
- Website: www.cbtravel.com/

Christopherson Business Travel is a corporate Travel Management Company headquartered in Salt Lake City, Utah, and founded in 1953.

Christopherson is the largest travel agency in Utah, and the largest national travel affiliate of BCD Travel, with pre-pandemic sales US$682 million in annual sales (2018) and more than 480 employees.

Christopherson owns and operates Andavo Travel, a network of independent vacation travel agents and All Seasons Sports Travel, which specializes in fan-based travel planning and packages. They also acquired CV Travel, a travel agency focused on humanitarian and faith-based travel.

The State of Utah currently lists Christopherson as its Contracted Travel Agency.

== History ==
Christopherson Business Travel was founded by Merrill and Lucille Christopherson in 1953. Lucille's brother, John L. Weenig was brought in as manager and part owner shortly thereafter. Under his leadership and management the agency grew to have three locations in Utah. Weenig retired about 1980. In 1981, Michael A. Cameron and his wife, Camille, purchased a part-ownership position from the original founders and owners. By March 1990 the Cameron's had purchased 100 percent of the company.

In January 2008, the company merged with Andavo Travel, creating one of the top 20 U.S. travel management companies.

Effective March 2010, Michael A. Cameron and his wife Camille purchased the business and vacation travel divisions of Andavo Travel. The business travel division of the combined company is now branded and marketed nationally as Christopherson Business Travel. The vacation travel and independent contractor division is branded under Andavo Travel.

At the end of 2013, Christopherson acquired Alabama-based All Seasons Travel. All Seasons' business travel division was absorbed into Christopherson Business Travel, the leisure division was absorbed into Andavo Travel, and a new division, All Seasons Sports Travel, was created to cater to the fan-based travel which All Seasons Travel specialized in. All employee positions were retained and Mike Cameron continued as CEO.

In 2016, Christopherson acquired CV Humanitarian Travel, a division focused on providing travel services for non-profit and faith-based trips. Prior to the COVID-19 pandemic, the company allowed employees to travel on company-sponsored humanitarian trips, but those have not resumed post-pandemic.

Christopherson is currently ranked #23 out of the top travel management companies in the United States by Travel Weekly, a top publication of the corporate travel industry. This is down from the 12th spot in 2018.

As of March 2020, Christopherson has closed its physical offices in Birmingham, San Francisco and Denver and has laid off over 100 employees as a result of the COVID-19 Virus. Those were the first layoffs in the company's history.

In an effort to stem the post-pandemic decline, Josh Cameron, son of CEO Mike Cameron, has taken on a more prominent role.

In July 2024, the company announced its offices would be closed for network upgrades, during which layoffs occurred. These were the first non-pandemic layoffs in the company’s 50-year history.

The company developed a new iOS app in 2024 using the brand Andavo.

== Products ==
In the mid-2000's Christopherson Business Travel developed AirPortal, at the time a cutting-edge integrated travel technology platform that houses the company's proprietary technology, user dashboards, benchmarking and reporting tools, online booking tools, and mobile applications.

In 2012, Christopherson Business Travel developed and released AirPortal 360, a dashboard for travel managers, which grants access to Christopherson's collection of corporate travel management software. The technology was designed to assist in the reduction of corporate travel spend, facilitate duty of care responsibilities, keep track of unused tickets, access traveler profiles, and ensure policy compliance. In conjunction with their AirPortal 360 software release, Christopherson also released, My Travel, a similarly customized dashboard with specific tools for individual business travelers. In 2013, the company developed and released AirPortal 360 Mobile, the first app created for travel managers to manage their travel programs from mobile devices. The company has been working on a replacement for several years, but the release date is undetermined.

== Honors ==
- Business Travel News ranked Christopherson Business Travel #11 on their 2014 Business Travel Management Companies
- Travel Weekly ranked Christopherson Business Travel #26 on their 2017 Power List, a national ranking of corporate and leisure travel agencies. Christopherson also ranked on the list in 2011, 2012, 2013, 2014, 2015, and 2016.
- Utah Business Magazine Fast 50 award winner in 2019., 2018, 2017, 2016, 2015,
- Christopherson was named #1 Women-Owned Company in Colorado by Colorado Biz Magazine in 2019, 2018, 2017, 2016, and 2015.
- Christopherson CEO, Mike Cameron, was named in 2012 CEO of the Year by Utah Business Magazine
- Utah's Best of State winner in 2010, 2011, 2012 under the Hospitality, Travel and Tourism category.
- 1st place for Fastest-Growing private business by Denver Business Journal 2010
- Christopherson is ranked #1 Travel Agency in Utah by Utah Business Magazine
- Christopherson Business Travel was given the When Work Works Award (former the Alfred P. Sloan Award for Business Excellence in Workplace Flexibility) 2009-2013 and again in 2016

== See also ==
- BCD Travel
