= Mity-Lite =

American manufacturer

MityLite
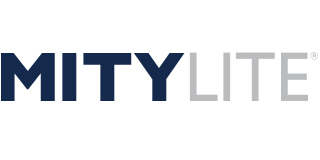
- Founded: 1987
- Headquarters: Orem, Utah, United States
- Key people: Kevin McCoy, CEO
- Products: Commercial furniture
- Number of employees: 400+
- Website: mitylite.com

MityLite, Inc. is an American manufacturer of tables, chairs, portable dance floors, staging, and other event furniture.

== History ==
MityLite is a global manufacturer of commercial furniture. Based in Orem, Utah, MityLite is part of the MITY Incorporated family of product brands, which include Holsag, Bertolini, and Broda. MityLite manufactures and sells banquet chairs, folding tables, a sprung dance floor, folding chairs, stacking chairs, Chiavari chairs, outdoor furniture, and other event furnishings for the hospitality industry and other public spaces.

The company was founded In 1987 by Greg Wilson, who owned Church Furnishings, Inc, a company that made pews and other church furniture. He secured a $1 million contract order with the Church of Jesus Christ of Latter-day Saints for a banquet table he had developed. However, Wilson lacked the financing to manufacture the table. After a deal with Samsonite failed, Wilson incorporated as MITY Enterprises, Inc., with US$500,000 from Angel Investors.

In March 1994, MITY Enterprises went public, selling 900,000 shares of common stock at US$5.25 per share. The company was listed on the NASDAQ under the ticker symbol MITY. In July 2007 Mity Enterprises merged with Sorenson Capital and Peterson Partners, both Salt Lake City-based private equity firms.

Prospect Capital Corp. became the parent company of MITY in September 2013. Kevin McCoy was named CEO in November of 2023.
