= American Biotech =

American Biotech Labs, LLC.
- Company type: Private
- Headquarters: Alpine, Utah, United States
- Website: https://www.ablsilver.com/

American Biotech Labs, LLC. is a privately held silver nanotechnology company based in Alpine, Utah established in 1998.

== Technology ==
Products developed by American Biotech Labs primarily involve an aqueous sol of silver(I,III) oxide particles, termed "SilverSol" or silver hydrosol.

SilverSol is used in the medical dressing ASAP Wound Dressing Gel, held by American Biotech Labs' sister company, ABL Medical.

== Applications ==
SilverSol technology, the main focus of American Biotech Labs, is used in dentistry for developing connective tissue reattachment procedures using erbium lasers, restorative protocols, endodontic protocols, bone grafting protocols, dental implants, and non-surgical periodontal protocols. It has been approved by the EPA for both initial cleaning and maintenance of dental waterlines.

Additionally, the approved product has been found to be effective against biofilms.
