= Revere Health =

American healthcare company

- Formerly: Central Utah Clinic
- Company type: Accountable care organization
- Industry: Healthcare
- Founded: 1960; 66 years ago in Provo, Utah, United States
- Headquarters: Provo, Utah, United States
- Number of locations: 100+
- Area served: Utah, northern Arizona, & southeastern Nevada
- Key people: Scott Bingham (Chair)
- Products: Healthcare services
- Number of employees: 1700+ (2017)
- Website: reverehealth.com

Revere Health is the largest independent multispecialty physician group in Utah and southeastern Nevada, United States.

== Description ==
The company employs 175 physicians and 130 advanced practitioners at over 100 locations throughout Utah, as well as northern Arizona and southeastern Nevada.

== History ==
Founded in Provo in 1960, the company was formerly known as Central Utah Clinic. However, in the early 2010s it began expanding into northern and southern Utah. With its wider service area it became prudent to change the identity of the company from its regional name. In rebranded itself as Revere Health in July 2015.

In 2012, Revere Health became the first healthcare organization in Utah to be accredited as an accountable care organization.

In 2021 it was revealed that the group was impacted by a phishing attack the lead to the exposure of around 12,000 patients.
