= Puranokot =

== Basic ==
Puranokot पुरानोकोट
- Village development committee
- Location in Nepal Puranokot (Nepal)
- Coordinates: 28.19°N 84.35°E
- Country: Nepal
- Zone: Gandaki Zone
- District: Lamjung District

Population (1991)
  - Total: 1,666
- Time zone: UTC+5:45 (Nepal Time)

Puranokot is a village development committee in Lamjung District in the Gandaki Zone of northern-central Nepal. At the time of the 1991 Nepal census it had a population of 1666 people living in 330 individual households.
