= Young Living =

American multi-level marketing company

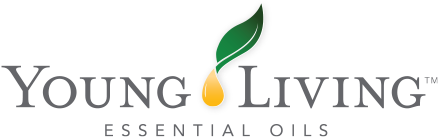
- Type: Private
- Industry: Multi-level marketing
- Founded: 1993
- Founder: D. Gary Young and Mary Young
- Headquarters: Lehi, Utah, United States
- Number of locations: 33 corporate offices
- Key people: Mary Young (CEO)
- Products: Essential oils, home products
- Website: www.youngliving.com

Young Living is a multi-level marketing company based in Lehi, Utah. Co-founded by D. Gary Young and Mary Young in 1993, it sells essential oils and other related products.

== History ==
=== 1993–2014: Formation of Young Living ===
D. Gary Young gained an interest in alternative medicine after suffering a back injury in the early 1970s. Then, he became interested in essential oils after meeting with a French lavender distiller at a conference in California before traveling to France to learn distillation. He purchased a 160-acre (65 ha) farm in St. Maries, Idaho, with his wife in the early 1990s, and Young Living was founded in 1993 in Riverton, Utah, with Gary as CEO, and incorporated in 1994. A second farm in Mona, Utah, was purchased in 1996.

In 1996, the company projected sales of between $8 and $10 million, and reported annual sales of more than $1 billion from 2015 and 2017.

Starting in 2000, Young ran the Young Life Research clinic in Springville, Utah. After settling a lawsuit in 2005, the clinic was closed, and he opened a clinic in Ecuador, practicing medicine and performing surgery there, over concerns from Young Living's COO, David Stirling. He also opened his first international farm in Ecuador in 2006. In 2010, they became the "first large commercial distillery" to distill essential oils from frankincense, and in 2014 their Highland Flats distillery "became the first automated, large-capacity, computerized steam distilling facility ... for essential oils".

In 2008, David Stirling was fired from the firm and founded the rival company doTerra, and in August 2013, Young Living filed suit against doTerra for theft of trade secrets, alleging that the company had recreated their production process illegally. Young Living lost the case in 2017, and in 2018, a judge ordered it to pay doTerra's legal fees amounting to $1.8 million. The companies also settled lawsuits around faked lab tests, false advertising, and theft of trade secrets, and withdrew their negative claims in relation to the purity of each other's products.

=== 2015 to present: Post D. Gary Young ===
Young stepped down as CEO in 2015, and his third wife, Mary Young, assumed the role. The company moved their corporate operations to Lehi, Utah, in 2014, receiving tax breaks in order to expand their operations, and in 2017, started construction on their new corporate headquarters. Gary died in 2018.

== Business model ==
Young Living employs a multi-level marketing model, recruiting "thousands of independent distributors who can sell directly to customers and earn commissions on sales to distributors recruited into a hierarchical network called 'downlines'". Although distributors can potentially make a profit from direct sales, more money is made by commissions through sales made by people who the distributors recruit. Distributors are categorized based on their sales: the lowest rank with the least sales are referred to as simply "Distributors", while at the top are the "Royal Crown Diamonds".

In 2017, the New Yorker reported that distributors are required by Young Living to make $100 of purchases per month to qualify for a commission. According to a public income statement from 2016, approximately 94% of Young Living's active members made less than a dollar, while less than one tenth of one percent (about one thousand Royal Crown Diamond distributors) made over a million dollars.

According to an analysis of the company's 2018 income disclosure statement by Business Insider, 89% of all members attempting their own business were on the bottom tier, earning an average of $4 annually, while those on the first three tiers, comprising 98.7% of active members, averaged between $4 and $1,551 annually, not counting required monthly costs to remain active with the company.

== Products ==
Young Living sells essential oils and other related products. It claims to sell completely pure, naturally derived oils. Its products are sold online and through distributors.

A report by Business Insider in 2020 documented at least 11 complaints made to the FDA between 2013 and 2014 of "Young Living customers claiming serious adverse event reactions to the products". The FDA concluded the cause of one case to be a possible product failure while the others determined to be the result of incorrect usage or allergic reaction.

== Prohibited marketing claims ==
In September 2014, Young Living was one of three companies warned by the U.S. Food and Drug Administration for its marketing practices. The FDA identified multiple instances of claims being made by Young Living's distributors on social media and other websites where they marketed Young Living products as possible treatments for cures of Ebola virus and other conditions. The letter also stated that Young Living's website made claims that promoted products in such a way that the federal government would classify the products as drugs. The company subsequently agreed to address the violations cited by the FDA.

In 2020, the National Advertising Division of the Better Business Bureau recommended Young Living stop claiming that its products are 'therapeutic grade', as it did not have the requisite scientific support to support such claims. The company disagreed and stated they would appeal, while at the same time agreeing to stop making various health and wellness claims about its products and their ingredients.

In 2022, the FDA issued a warning letter to Young Living for illegally marketing several of their products as misbranded, unapproved, new drugs, including "Essential Oil", "Vitality", "Ningxia", and "Nature's Ultra CBD", when none of such products had been adequately studied by "adequate and well-controlled clinical studies in the published literature that support a determination that any of these products are generally recognized as safe and effective for use under the conditions prescribed, recommended or suggested in their labeling." Specifically for the product containing cannabidiol (CBD) called "Nature's Ultra CBD", the FDA stated that a "nonprescription drug product containing CBD cannot be legally marketed without an approved new drug application, regardless of whether the CBD is represented on the labeling as an active ingredient or an inactive ingredient. To date, no CBD-containing drug has met applicable FDA requirements to be legally marketed for nonprescription use."

== Litigation ==
In 2000, the Utah Occupational Safety and Health Division (UOSHD) investigated a distiller explosion that fatally wounded a worker at Young Living Farms in Mona. UOSHD fined Young Living Farms $10,280 for seven safety violations.

In 2014, Young Living hired counsel for an internal investigation of its importing practices. The investigation resulted in the voluntary disclosure of violations of the Lacey Act of 1900 and the Endangered Species Act of 1973 for illegally trafficking rosewood oil and spikenard oil. The company was subsequently fined $760,000 in 2017 after pleading guilty to the charges. In addition to the fines levied, the company was placed on probation for a period of five years.

In April 2019, a proposed class-action lawsuit was filed under the RICO Act, alleging that Young Living is an unlawful pyramid scheme. The suit was dismissed in 2021 for failing to adequately allege the claims made by plaintiff.
