= Maxwell Products Inc. =

Maxwell Products, Inc.
- Company type: Private
- Industry: Pavement Preservation Products
- Founded: 1975 in Salt Lake City, Utah, United States
- Founder: Ted Maxwell, Delwyn Maxwell
- Headquarters: Salt Lake City, Utah
- Products: asphalt crack and concrete joint sealants, pavement mastic, pavement patch
- Brands: Elastoflex, NUVO, GAP Mastic, GAP Patch
- Website: MaxwellProducts.com

Maxwell Products, Inc. is a privately held, pavement maintenance products manufacturing company based in Salt Lake City, Utah. Founded in 1975 by brothers Ted and Delwyn Maxwell, Maxwell Products manufactures asphalt and concrete pavement preservation products, including Elastoflex crack and concrete joint sealant, NUVO premium crack and concrete joint sealant, GAP Mastic, and GAP Patch.

== Products ==
Asphalt crack and concrete joint sealants

- Elastoflex - Maxwell Products' original line of asphalt crack and concrete joint sealants.
- NUVO - Maxwell Products' premium line of hot-pour asphalt crack and concrete joint sealants.

Asphalt and concrete distress repair

- GAP Mastic - a hot-pour, asphalt-based, polymer-modified asphalt and concrete maintenance material with engineered aggregate designed for wide cracks, cupping, depressions, pavement fatigue (alligatored areas), small voids and potholes, open seams, utility cuts, and shoulder deterioration.
- GAP Patch - a hot-pour, asphalt-based, polymer-modified pavement maintenance material with engineered aggregate designed for voids, potholes, and trenching.

== Technologies ==
Packaging

Maxwell Products' invented the industry's first fully meltable packaging, PolySkin. This patented, expanded bead technology is designed like interlocking building blocks, which make the containers stable and stackable when palletized.

Also in the packaging category, Maxwell Products introduced their patented ZipBox cardboard packaging, featuring a perforated side and a "handle" in the lid for quick, easy opening. ZipBox is also designed to lay flat for stacking and recycling.

Formulas

Other technological advancements include inteliBond, a proprietary formulation of polymers and other materials designed to help sealants bond better to pavements and to resist adhesion to surfaces such as car tires and shoes.
