= HZO =

American nanotechnology company

- Industry: Thin film coatings
- Headquarters: Raleigh, North Carolina, United States
- Number of locations: Headquarters in Research Triangle Park. Additional Offices in Nyúl, Hungary and San Jose, CA. Centers of Excellence in Shenzhen, China and Bắc Ninh, Vietnam. 14 locations total.
- Area served: Worldwide
- Products: Parylene and Nanocoating protection for electronic devices
- Services: Turnkey coating services
- Website: hzo.com

HZO manufactures thin film coatings applied to devices during their assembly processes to protect electronics from damage caused by exposure to corrosive liquids. HZO headquarters are located in Raleigh, North Carolina. The company also has Centers of Excellence in Shenzhen, China and Bac Ninh, Vietnam.

== Background ==
HZO is funded through a combination of equity and debt financing. The company publicly unveiled its protective technology for electronics at the Consumer Electronics Show (CES) in 2012. In 2013 and early 2014 the company expanded its corporate offices and production facilities worldwide to include locations in China, Japan and California. The company also has several application partners throughout Asia with further expansion anticipated. HZO revenues increased by more than 90% in 2013 and the company expects continued growth in 2014 with a consequent increase in royalties. The company’s tagline is “protection from the inside out.”

== Technology ==
HZO’s technology is applied directly to the circuitry of devices and components, creating a physical barrier that protects electronics against damage caused by water and other corrosive liquids, humidity, sweat, dust and debris. HZO’s early customer base included medical, military, automotive and consumer markets. Products implementing HZO technology include a Tag Heuer smartphone, along with a variety of wearable devices, which has helped secure HZO as a differentiating feature in wearable computing technology. In 2013, the company unveiled enhancements to its proprietary equipment and machinery, and the company began mass manufacturing with an international brand on a wearable device.
