= Miche (bag) =

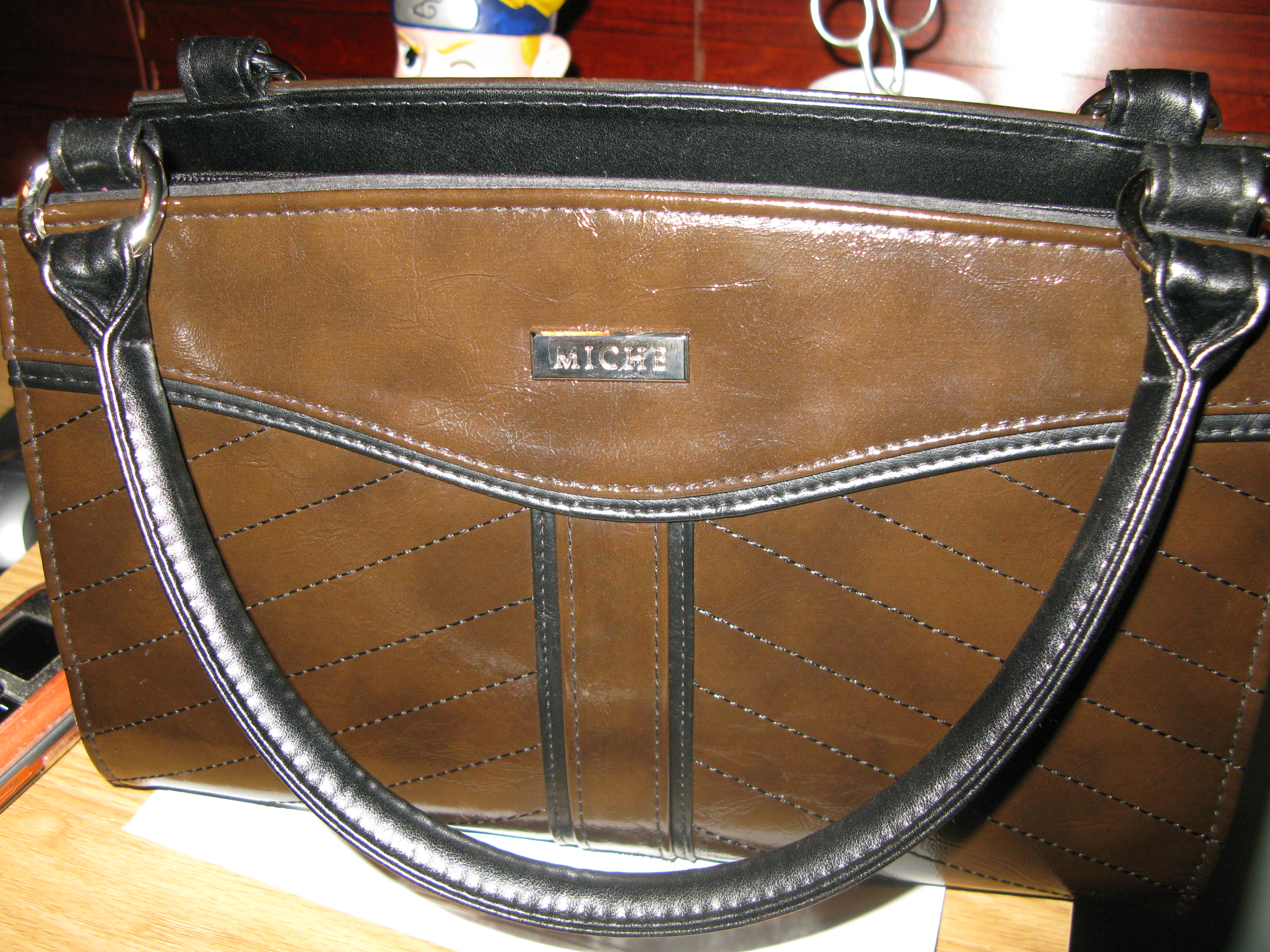
The front of a Miche bag

Miche (pronounced MEE-chee) is the name of a fashion handbag with interchangeable designs and handles. The company specializes in hand and shoulder bags based on a system of magnetic interchangeable bag covers (or Shells) and accompanying accessories.

== History ==
The company was founded in 2005 by Michelle Romero and Annette Cavaness. In 2004, Romero thought of an idea to change the outside of a handbag, without physically changing the bag itself. She created a prototype by taking apart her own bag and revamping it using super glue and scrap fabric.

The name of the company came from Michelle's nickname, Miche (pronounced MEE-chee), which her mother-in-law calls her.

The company was previously a subsidiary of Party Plan, based in South Jordan, Utah, United States. In March 2016, the US distributors of Miche bags closed the company down and organized a liquidation sale. Production and distribution continued through their former international partners including Miche Canada and Miche Europe. In April 2021, the patents and trademarks were purchased by four previous Miche representatives. Headquarters were relocated in Elizabeth, Colorado, and wholesale distribution relaunched in the USA.

== Styles and designs ==
Miche Base Bags were available in four sizes and various colors. Base Bags featured different internal pocket layouts and removable handles. Shells could be purchased separately or with a Base Bag, and attached to the Base Bag using magnets. The exteriors of the Classic and Petite Base Bags incorporated a silk and polyester blend in their hard-sided construction, while the Demi and Prima sizes were made of softer materials. Shell materials varied depending on the style, but were generally made from faux leather, canvas or cotton. The Miche line also included other specialty bags that were not interchangeable as well as coin purses and wallets. New Shells and accessories were released monthly.

On January 8, 2010, Miche introduced its Hope Initiative: A portion of the proceeds from the sale of each specially designed Hope Shell and related accessories went directly to various charitable organizations.

== See also ==
- BiArtis
