= Vulcan Tire =

Vulcan Sales Inc.
- Type: Private
- Industry: Retail
- Founded: 1997
- Headquarters: Sandy, Utah, United States
- Products: Tires, tire chains, tire accessories, tire gauges, tire pressure monitoring systems (TPMS)
- Website: www.vulcantire.com

Vulcan Tire is an American online retailer. Their merchandise includes tires, tire chains, TPMS, tire accessories and cargo control devices. Vulcan Tire was founded in 1997 and is based in Sandy, Utah.

== History ==
Vulcan Tire has a history of sponsoring and promoting club motorsports and supporting local automotive enthusiasts. Vulcan Tire sponsored a team who crossed the United States on an "Xtreme Roadtrip", as well offering prizes at local auto cross events.

In June 2014, the company became the first tire retailer in the world to accept Bitcoin payments.

Vulcan Tire is currently one of the top online retailers for customer’s satisfaction.

== Website ==
=== Products ===
Most of the products sold on Vulcan Tire are tire related items, such at tires, tire chains and tire gauges. The company does sell some items not directly related to tires such as cargo control products.

Vulcan Tire displays reviews on tire products. These reviews ranks tire products on over 12 different criteria.

Vulcan Tire is an Thule Authorized Internet Retailer. This ensures Thule products purchased from Vulcan Tire are backed by Thule's warranty and supplied by authorized distribution channels.

== Awards ==
- Bizrate Circle of Excellence Award 2013
- Bizrate Circle of Excellence Award 2014
- Bizrate Platinum Circle of Excellence Award 2015
