= ScuttlePad =

ScuttlePad was a social network launched in August 2010 for children aged 6–11 years old. Users can add friends, upload photos and update statuses through pre-defined word lists. It is a self-funded venture established in Utah.

== Overview ==
ScuttlePad was created to be an educational social network for children under 13 years old, the minimum required age for most social networks. The site was created because many children use Facebook and MySpace before they turn the minimum required age and recent studies have shown the increase in usage of social networks among children under the required age for registration.

== How ScuttlePad Works ==
Users require a parental email address and answers to security questions to create a profile. Users create profiles and upload photos. Members can add friends and communicate using pre-defined word lists. All photos are manually reviewed by ScuttlePad management. Adults may not join ScuttlePad, but can use the site in a supervisory role with their children. ScuttlePad offers basic social networking, including user photos and status updates, and communication among users.

=== Security, Profanity & Cyberbullying Prevention ===
ScuttlePad abides by the requirements of the Children's Online Privacy Protection Act (COPPA) guidelines. The act applies to websites and online services and details what the site's responsibilities are to protect children's privacy and safety online. The act also determines the restrictions on marketing to children under the age of 13.

ScuttlePad's pre-defined word lists prevent profane language from usage on the site. The word lists may produce nonsensical statuses but block swearing and offensive language.

Underage children on social networks without safeguards are susceptible to cyberbullying and online predation. Forms of cyberbullying include harassing emails, instant messages, Facebook chats or Facebook wall posts.

== Founder ==
Founder Chad Perry spent nine months studying how youngsters use Facebook prior to establishing the site. He decided to create ScuttlePad because many of his friends' children were unsafely updating their statuses and were also under the age limit for Facebook.

== See also ==
- Togetherville
- Club Penguin
- Webkinz
