= State Bank of Southern Utah =

Community bank in Utah, founded in 1957

- Industry: Banking
- Headquarters: Cedar City, Utah
- Number of locations: 17
- Area served: Southern and Central Utah
- Products: Financial Services
- Number of employees: (250+)
- Website: sbsu.com

State Bank of Southern Utah is a community bank that services Southern Utah and is headquartered in Cedar City. Founded in 1957, the bank operates 17 branches across 14 cities and towns in Southern and Central Utah. It is the only locally owned and operated bank in Southern Utah and is a member of the Utah Bankers Association, the American Bankers Association, and the Federal Deposit Insurance Corporation. The president and CEO is Trevor Andersen as of January 2025.

The company offers a wide range of banking products and services including: personal banking, business banking, home loans, consumer and personal loans, commercial lending, and personal trusts and investments.

Their focus is in lending to the small businesses and individuals in their communities. The vast majority of its mortgages are sold on to the Federal Housing Administration or Fannie Mae.

== History ==
State Bank of Southern Utah was founded on November 25, 1957 by a group of local Cedar City community leaders who wanted a bank with the ability to serve local livestock, and farmers needs, as well as provide loans for homes and businesses. The first stockholder meeting was held in the Old Escalante Hotel in Cedar City on September 27, 1957.

When they first opened in 1957, they had 5 employees and less than $1 million in assets. As of 2025 State Bank of Southern Utah remains locally owned and operated with more than 250 employees and just over $2.5 billion in assets.

== Rebrand ==
In 2023, State Bank of Southern Utah unveiled a new logo featuring the Bristlecone Pine. One of the oldest living tree species on Earth, some trees are over 4,800 years old. Native to the Western United States, including Utah, the Bristlecone Pine is known for its ability to thrive in harsh, high-altitude environments.
