= The Village Bank =

Former Bank

Village Bancorporation
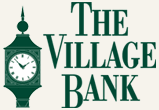
- Industry: Finance
- Founded: August 1996
- Headquarters: Saint George, Utah, USA
- Products: Financial services
- Website: https://www.cachevalleybank.com/

Village Bancorporation was a locally owned and managed bank holding company headquartered Saint George, Utah, USA. In 2014, The Village Bank finalized a merger with Cache Valley Bank.

== History ==
The Village Bank was founded in August 1996 in St. George, Utah. Ownership consisted of approximately 350 individuals, located for the most part in the St. George area.

Effective May 23, 2012, The Village Bank completed a sales transaction in which Cache Valley Bank will acquire the Sunset, River Road, and Cottonmill (Washington City) offices. The Village Bank continued to operate independently at the Main Office at 294 E Tabernacle in St George.

On March 1, 2014, The Village Bank completed a merger with Cache Valley Bank.
