= Stephen's Gourmet =

American gourmet food brand

Logo for Stephen's Gourmet

Stephen's Gourmet is an American gourmet food brand owned by Indulgent Foods, based in Farmington, Utah. Stephen's Gourmet is also the brand name of the company's hot cocoa powder it manufactures and sells in the United States. It is a marketed as a premium-quality hot cocoa. The principal flavor is milk chocolate, but Stephen's Gourmet markets the powder in a variety of flavors. The company's "core flavors" are milk chocolate, mint truffle, French vanilla, and chocolate raspberry.

== History ==
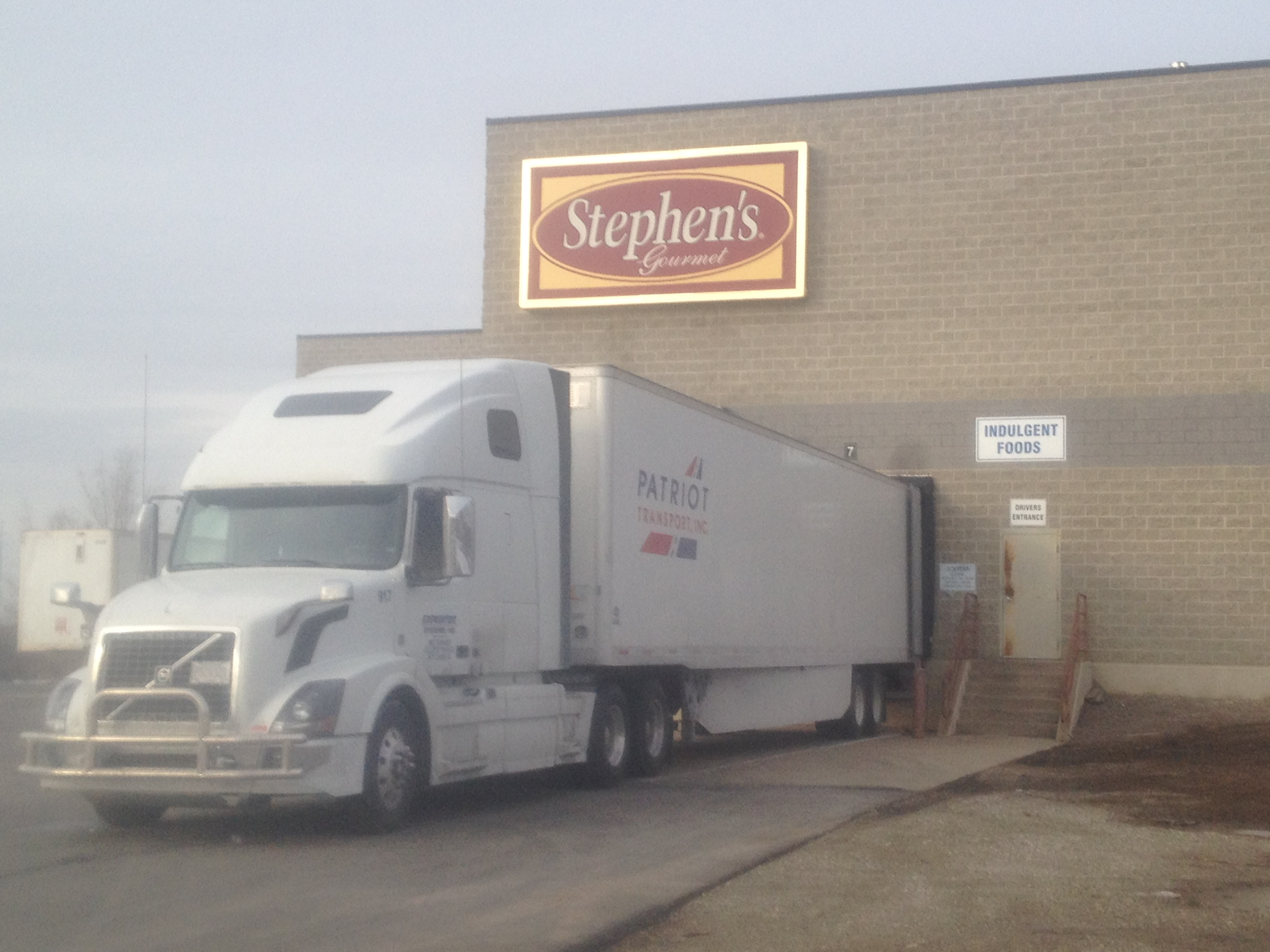
Indulgent Foods headquarters in Farmington, Utah

In the 1980s, Stephen Story experimented with different types of hot chocolate and gave them to his neighbors as Christmas gifts. In 1990, Story founded the company, originally called Stephen's Gourmet Kitchens. By 2000, Stephen's Gourmet composed 40% of the Utah market and sold in 48 states. In 2002, Indulgent Foods acquired the trademark for Stephen's Gourmet.

In 2007 Stephen's introduced Stephen's Gourmet Candycane Cocoa, which contains crushed peppermint candy cane that melts in hot water.

In early 2010, the company launched Stephen's Gourmet Fry Sauce.
