= Construction Monitor =

Market research company

- Industry: Construction
- Founded: 1989; 37 years ago
- Founder: David B. Mineer Sr.
- Headquarters: Cedar City, UT
- Area served: United States
- Services: construction market data, construction leads
- Website: Constructionmonitor.com

Construction Monitor is a business that makes building permit information available to suppliers, subcontractors, and building industry professionals in the construction industry. Construction Monitor provide records of residential, commercial, swimming pool and solar building permits in a searchable database. This lead generation service is available in all 50 US states, making Construction Monitor the nation's largest provider of real-time building permit data.

== History ==
The company was founded in 1989 by David B. Mineer Sr. in Parowan, Utah. Mineer's work as a commercial architect brought him to city offices where he observed construction professionals waiting in line to view the most recent building permits. He offered to collect the permits and mail them directly to the builders, and that service of mailing permits is the foundation on which the business was formed. While the business started as a mailed newsletter, it has since transitioned to an online database.

== Market Impact ==
The following data collected by Construction Monitor has been recognized nationally for bringing to light construction trends, and insights on housing affordability.

- During the 2011–17 California drought, information gathered by Construction Monitor showed that in spite of drought conditions, Californians were building more swimming pools than ever before.
- In the years following the Great Recession in the United States, building permit information aggregated by Construction Monitor provided insight on how homeowners were responding to depressed home values and lending restrictions.
- As the use of Solar power in the United States increased, data collected by Construction Monitor provided insights on solar and green building trends.

== Recognition ==
- Construction Monitor has been featured on Discovery Channel's "Innovations" with Ed Begley Jr.
