= BambooHR =

American technology company

Bamboo HR LLC
- BambooHR's logo
- Type: Private
- Industry: Technology company software
- Founded: 2008; 18 years ago
- Founders: Ben Peterson; Ryan Sanders
- Headquarters: Lindon, Utah, U.S.
- Key people: Brad Rencher (CEO); Ben Peterson, Ryan Sanders (co-chairmen)
- Services: Human resources software as a service, human capital management software as a service and applicant tracking system
- Number of employees: 1,000 employees (August 2021)
- Website: bamboohr.com

BambooHR LLC is an American technology company that provides human resources software as a service. Founded in 2008 by Ben Peterson and Ryan Sanders, the company is based in Lindon, Utah.

BambooHR's services include an applicant tracking system and an employee benefits tracker.

== History ==
BambooHR was founded in 2008 by Ben Peterson and Ryan Sanders. Based in Lindon, Utah, the company has a dancing panda mascot. In November 2019, BambooHR had 470 employees. In 2019, BambooHR served 11,000 clients that were based in 100 countries. BambooHR customers in 2017 included Shopify, Foursquare, and Reddit.

Most of BambooHR's employees are salaried employees and do not qualify for overtime. BambooHR has an "anti-workaholic policy" in which employees are forbidden from laboring over a 40-hour week. Company co-founder Ryan Sanders' rationale was that occupational burnout has a detrimental effect on the health of his employees and negatively affects their families and his company. He started taking this view during his organizational leadership studies as a graduate student at Gonzaga University.

BambooHR started a "paid paid vacation" policy in 2015. Employees who have worked at BambooHR for at least six months are eligible for $2,000 in reimbursements for vacation expenses like airline tickets, hotel rooms, and other tourist activities.

In October 2019, BambooHR appointed Brad Rencher, who had previously been a marketing executive at Adobe Inc., to replace Ben Peterson as the company's CEO. Peterson became a co-chairman on the board of directors with fellow co-founder Ryan Sanders.

In October 2026, BambooHR took down their entire system over concerns that PHP2Shell critical security flaws could leave them vulnerable to hacking efforts. The incident was wide-spread and affected companies across the world, not just BambooHR.

== Software ==
BambooHR provides companies a human resources management software as a service. The service has a dashboard homepage with different sections for employee information, vacation time record keeping, and reports. The sections are: "My Info", "Employees", "Job Openings", "Reports", and "Files". The dashboard also contains an employee's image, contact details, and vacation time remaining. It has areas that show scheduled lessons and business communications. Users can see their coworkers' birthdays and scheduled time off.

BambooHR's software includes an applicant tracking system. The system has a catalogue of job opportunities and data about each opportunity including the hiring manager, how many people have applied, and how long it has been posted. BambooHR's integration allows job openings to be posted at the same time to the company's jobs page and to career sites like Glassdoor and Indeed.

BambooHR allows companies to record employee benefits. It includes reports that help employees fill out Affordable Care Act compliance forms. In 2017, Juan Martinez and Rob Marvin wrote in PC Magazine that BambooHR's benefits administration functionalities are inferior to Zenefits'. They concluded that although the software is "easy to get up and running", it is more expensive than a large number of its competitors and its website is "pretty but lacks functionality". It also has a performance review feature. It provides an open API to allow combination with other HR software services. In 2017, the company started BambooHR Marketplace to allow software developers to market HR apps they have integrated with BambooHR.
