= ASEA (American company) =

American multi-level marketing company

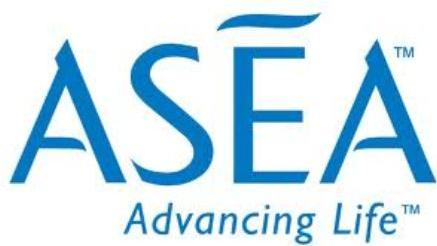
- Formerly: Medical Immune Research, Inc. and ASEA, Inc.
- Company type: Private
- Founded: 2007
- Founders: Verdis Norton; James Pack; Tyler Norton
- Headquarters: Pleasant Grove, Utah, United States
- Website: aseaglobal.com

ASEA is a privately owned international direct selling and multi-level marketing company founded in 2007 and headquartered in Pleasant Grove, Utah.. The company markets health and wellness products that claim to support cellular health through proprietary formulations.

== History ==
It has previously been known as Medical Immune Research, Inc. and ASEA, Inc.

ASEA is based on technology developed and patented by Medical Discoveries, Inc, a publicly traded company (MLSC).

MDI went up for sale in 2007, and board member Verdis Norton secured investment to purchase the technology. Under the company name of ASEA, they began selling the product in 2009 with an official launch in 2010. ASEA's first product was a liquid supplement initially also named ASEA, and currently known as ASEA Redox Supplement.

Based in Pleasant Grove, Utah, ASEA opened a new production facility in 2013, and a new headquarters in 2017.

== Product evaluation ==
A 2012 double blinded and placebo controlled study of 20 participants was performed to assess the effectiveness of cyclists completing time trials (TT). The abstract found that "ASEA did not improve TT performance".

Physician Harriet Hall reviewed the scientific literature related to the assessment of ASEA as a dietary supplement, noting that there is no acceptable published evidence to confirm that it has any health benefits in humans. She has written about ASEA several times for Science-Based Medicine.

The conclusions of Harriet Hall were supported by Science Based Medicine. Similar conclusions were drawn by "Does It Really Work". An updated article by Science Based Medicine in 2017 further reiterated the conclusions of Harriet Hall, stating that ASEA's "core claim makes no scientific sense", and that the company engages in "clearly deceptive" marketing practices.

== Legal issues ==
In its press release on 10 March 2014, the Italian Competition Authority sanctioned 3 companies "for unfair business practices". One of them was ASEA Italy which was fined €150,000. According to the Antitrust case, "consumers are proposed to purchase products through mechanisms aimed in reality at recruiting other sellers who are asked for an initial contribution or a subscription to a programme of personal purchases ... It is a distributive mechanism considered incorrect by the Consumer Code for which the consumer cannot make a contribution in exchange for the opportunity to receive compensation that is derived primarily from the introduction of other consumers into the scheme rather than from the sale or consumption of products." It alleged that the position of Asea Italy is further aggravated by the fact that the company has attributed to their products curative properties that are not adequately substantiated and certified.
