= Nature's Sunshine Products =

American nutritional supplements company

Nature's Sunshine Products, Inc.
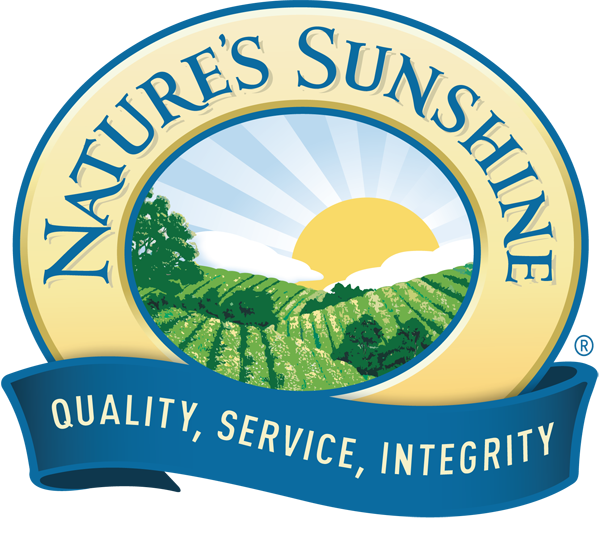
- Type: Public
- Traded as: Nasdaq: NATR; Russell 2000 Index component
- Industry: nutritional supplements
- Founded: 1972; 54 years ago
- Founder: Gene Hughes; Kristine Hughes
- Headquarters: Lehi, Utah U.S.
- Area served: Worldwide
- Key people: Terrence Moorehead (CEO); Gregory L. Probert (chairman of the board)
- Products: Dietary supplements
- Revenue: US$ 324.705 million (2015)
- Operating income: US$ 13.872 million (2015)
- Net income: US$ 13.656 million (2015)
- Total assets: US$ 200.520 million (2015)
- Number of employees: 901 (2015)
- Subsidiaries: Synergy Worldwide
- Website: naturessunshine.com

Nature's Sunshine Products, Inc. also known as "NSP", is a manufacturer of dietary supplements, including herbs, vitamins, minerals, and personal care products. It is based in Lehi, Utah, with a manufacturing facility in Spanish Fork, Utah.

== History ==
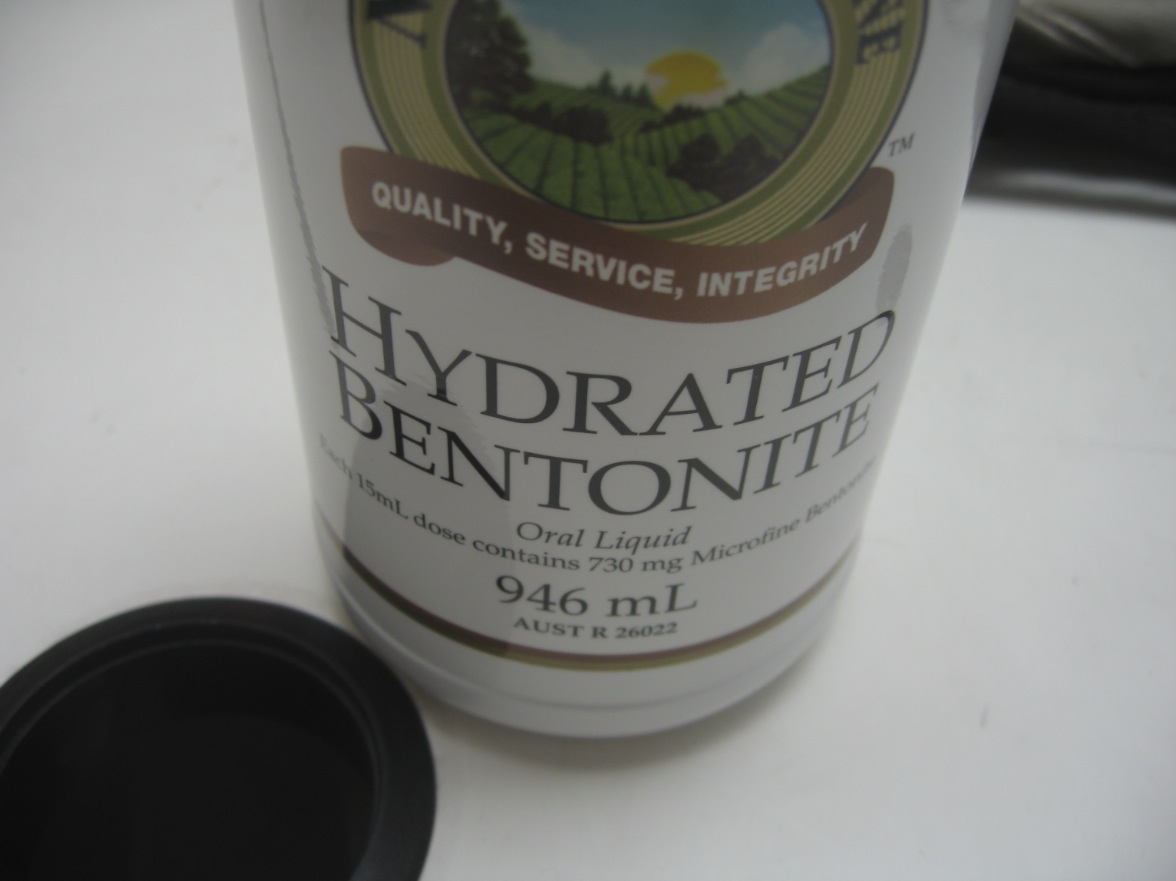
Hydrated Bentonite, one of Nature's Sunshine's products

Nature's Sunshine was founded in 1972 by Gene and Kristine Hughes, who started encapsulating capsicum in their home kitchen. The company employs a multi-level marketing business model in which their products are primarily sold to the consumer by independent distributors who receive commissions based on their own sales, as well as sign-up bonuses and commissions based upon the sales of any distributors they may have recruited.

NSP also owns Synergy Worldwide, a multi-level marketing company that also sells nutritional supplements. Products for both companies are manufactured in a production and research facility located in Spanish Fork, Utah.

In June 2021, Nature’s Sunshine Products, Inc. and the David Eccles School of Business at the University of Utah partnered together to create a new scholarship. Nature’s Sunshine Products, Inc. partnered with the Opportunity Scholars program to provide full-ride scholarships to underrepresented students who are the first in their family to attend college.

Like similar multilevel marketing companies, Nature's Sunshine's business has been adversely affected by the lingering effects of the COVID-19 pandemic, global inflation and the Russian invasion of Ukraine. In the 4th quarter of 2022, net sales fell 13% to $103 million, as compared to the 4th quarter of 2021. According to CEO Terrence Moorehead, the company is making "strategic changes" and "redesigning processes and revamping sourcing relationships."

== SEC bribery lawsuit ==
In 2006, KPMG, which had provided auditing services to the company, resigned from the account. They charged that then-CEO Douglas Faggioli had lied to auditors about "alleged fraud," and had approved bribery. In July 2009, the company agreed to pay $600,000 in fines after being charged by the SEC with having bribed Brazilian officials with more than $1,000,000 in 2000 and 2001. This was done "so it could import unregistered nutritional products into the country, and then falsified its books to hide the payments."
