= Heritage Internet Technologies =

Web Hosting and Design Company

- Type: Private
- Industry: Internet technology services
- Founded: 2001
- Founder: David Aitken
- Defunct: March 8, 2011
- Headquarters: Provo, Utah, United States
- Area served: Worldwide
- Key people: David Aitken, CEO
- Services: Web design, web hosting
- Revenue: US$11.6 million (2007)
- Owner: David Aitken, Brad Stone, (Note: This is not the same person as the Senior Technology Director at Brigham Young University.) Mark Strong
- Number of employees: 200 in-house 500 contract
- Parent: Heritage Group
- Website: Original site (archive)

Heritage Internet Technologies was a web design and web hosting company located in Provo, Utah and founded in 2001 which specialized in creating custom websites for small and medium-sized businesses. According to Inc.com's Inc. 5000, in 2007 it was the fastest growing company in Utah, the 3rd fastest growing IT company in the United States, and the 22nd fastest growing company overall. The company was ranked 392nd for 2008 in the Inc. 500 list, and 49th in the list of top 100 IT companies.

The company started with a small investment from the then-larger Heritage Group, which became entirely focused on the new web design firm. Former CEO Brad Stone told the Deseret Morning News that due to the growth of his firm and others near Provo (which is also home to a large Novell facility) that the company hired remote working programmers to keep up with demand. The company was featured in a segment of the infomercial scam The Economic Report, which was hosted by sports anchor Greg Gumbel.

The company closed for business on March 8, 2011 while leaving work on hundreds of customer websites uncompleted and owing millions to customers, vendors, employees, and the Internal Revenue Service.

== History ==
Heritage Internet Technologies was started as Heritage Web Solutions in 2001 by David Aitken with US $1000, startup money given to him by the owners of a mortgage refinancing company where Aitken was a manager. By 2005, the startup company had grown from one part-time employee to 65 employees, and the parent company had folded in favor of the new company. The company had over 700 employees (including contract workers) and was planning to expand into the United Kingdom by the end of 2008.

The Economic Report, a syndicated business and economy television program hosted by Greg Gumbel, announced in October 2008 that it would be featuring Heritage in an upcoming episode. Later investigations found The Economic Report to be an infomercial scam which charged $20,000-$30,000 for a five-minute segment.

Heritage was the subject of a May 2010 investigative report by KSL, the NBC affiliate in Salt Lake City, Utah. The report featured four different dissatisfied customers from outside Utah, an interview with Mark Strong (one of the owners), and a representative of the Utah chapter of the Better Business Bureau. The report indicated that the terms of service used by the company were very long and that most customers never read them.

=== Closure ===
The company shut down on March 8, 2011 without any warning to its customers or employees. Work on hundreds of customer websites was left uncompleted and customers were told via a recorded message to contact Fibernet, one of the hosting companies that Heritage used to resell hosting. The company owes over $17.1 million to the Internal Revenue Service and is being investigated for fraud by the Utah County Attorney's office. They also owe a substantial amount of money to their former employees who say that they either haven't gotten paid, or they've gotten paychecks that bounced. A former contract employee stated that she received numerous complaints from customers that Heritage had charged them for services they had not ordered.

Heritage issued a press release through its attorney on March 14, 2011 in which it stated it was unable to continue and would be dissolving after attempting to meet all of its obligations. Heritage was not accredited with the Better Business Bureau when it closed, although it previously had been accredited by the BBB for a number of years, during which time it had a "satisfactory" rating with the BBB. As of December 2010, Heritage Web Solutions had a "F" rating by the BBB under the BBB's new rating system.

Between 2007 and 2010, the BBB received 804 complaints regarding Heritage, and had by the time it closed a total of 972 complaints which came from every state but Maine and South Dakota. The complaints to the BBB generally referred to service delays, customer service issues, and refunds, of which 793 were resolved and 11 were administratively closed by the BBB. The BBB website for this company stated "The company states they are anxious to resolve their customer concerns....It is BBB policy to encourage consumers to attempt to resolve complaints with a company directly prior to contacting the BBB."

KSL-TV found during their investigation aired March 14, 2011, that several former employees of Heritage opened a new company named ISO Webworks on March 8, the same day Heritage closed their doors. They quoted Heritage's former marketing director as stating that the site for the new company was "[exactly the] same, even the code is the same. Nothing's been changed." Both Heritage's attorney and ISO Webworks deny any direct connection between the two companies.
