= Backcountry.com =

Online specialty retailer

- Type: Private company
- Industry: Retail
- Founded: 1996; 30 years ago
- Headquarters: West Valley City and Park City, Utah, United States
- Products: Outdoor gear
- Owner: CSC Generation
- Number of employees: 1200+
- Website: backcountry.com

Backcountry.com is an American online specialty retailer that sells clothing and outdoor recreation gear for hiking, camping, road biking, mountain biking, rock climbing, winter sports, fly fishing, kayaking, rafting, road and trail running, and more. Founded in 1996 and headquartered in Utah, the company operates multiple e-commerce platforms and formerly owned a network of niche gear websites. Backcountry.com expanded into Europe with its 2013 acquisition of German retailer Bergfreunde.de. As of 2024, it is owned by CSC Generation.

== History ==
Backcountry.com was founded in 1996 by Jim Holland and John Bresee. The two started the online business with a sparse collection of avalanche gear and began selling gear from their garage in Park City, Utah, under the domain names BCstore.com and BackcountryStore.com. The store's first sale, a Pieps 457 Opti-finder avalanche beacon, happened in February 1997. The company purchased the domain name backcountry.com for $75,000 in 2004.

Backcountry.com quickly became one of a very few profitable retailers and competed with REI for the lead in this category. REI never lost the lead. After rapid product growth Backcountry began to court other categories including discount and One Deal At A Time (ODAT) In an attempt to regain focus and target bargain-seekers, the company added niche websites such as SteepandCheap.com and outlets such as the now-defunct BackcountryOutlet.com and Tramdock.com. Deeply discounted product was eventually moved to an Outlet section accessible from the Backcountry.com homepage.

On May 7, 2007, it was announced that a controlling stake in Backcountry.com was sold to Liberty Media Corporation, which also controls QVC and other e-commerce companies. This transferred effective ownership of the company to billionaire John C. Malone.

On Dec 5, 2013, Backcountry.com announced its acquisition of German online outdoor retailer Bergfreunde.de. Bergfreunde was founded in 2006 in Kirchentellinsfurt, Germany, where the business first sold clothing and gear for climbing and mountaineering. Bergfreunde has since expanded its product selection to include gear for hiking, camping, snowsports, and avalanche safety.

On July 1, 2015, TSG Consumer Partners purchased Liberty's stake in Backcountry.com.

In December 2015, Backcountry.com CEO Jill Layfield resigned from her position as Backcountry.com CEO after working for the company in various capacities for 11 years. In June 2020, Melanie Cox became CEO. Cox replaced Jonathan Nielsen who had served as CEO since March 2016.

In September 2024, Backcountry.com was acquired by CSC Generation.

In January 2025, Melanie Cox resigned from her position as CEO. That same year, Kevin Lenau, CFO of the company, stepped in as interim CEO. During this time, Backcountry.com acquired Level Nine Sports and Velotech, Inc.

In April 2026, Backcountry launched Backcountry Garage, a brand incubator and innovation platform designed to provide emerging outdoor brands with resources, expertise, and distribution to scale. As part of the launch, Backcountry acquired Coalatree, a Utah-based outdoor apparel company known for using recycled and eco-friendly materials. Coalatree's president, JM Fabrizi, was named director of the new platform. Backcountry is seeking additional brands for Backcountry Garage.

== Lawsuits ==
In October 2018, Backcountry.com filed for trademarks protecting the word “backcountry", then proceeded to file lawsuits against smaller companies with the word "backcountry" in them, such as Backcountry Denim (now known as BDCo), Backcountry eBikes (now known as Backcou eBikes), Backcountry Babes (a female avalanche education clinic), and Marquette Backcountry Skis. This slew of lawsuits had caused controversy with backcountry enthusiasts around the world, leading to a social media backlash in late October 2019. On November 6, 2019, the company dropped one of the lawsuits and apologized for starting the controversy.

== Backcountry Athlete Sponsorship ==
Backcountry.com launched a non-traditional athlete sponsorship program in 2008, which requires that the athletes promote themselves and the brand they represent through social media. Backcountry.com-sponsored athletes are responsible for actively driving traffic to Backcountry.com through YouTube, Facebook, Twitter, Myspace, and blogs.

The program also acted as an affiliate marketing program in which Backcountry.com provided athletes with tools to track and measure their online impact and athletes got a percentage return on each sale that is referred through their community presence. That program is no longer running.
