= Venafi =

Cybersecurity company

Venafi, Inc
- Type: Private company
- Industry: Computer security; Internet security
- Founded: October 26, 2000; 26 years ago
- Headquarters: Salt Lake City, UT, United States
- Key people: Jeff Hudson; (President and CEO)
- Owner: CyberArk (2024–present)
- Website: www.venafi.com

Venafi, Inc. is a privately held cybersecurity company that develops software to secure and protect cryptographic keys and digital certificates. Its enterprise key and certificate management and security products are certificate authority (CA) independent and manage security instruments such as Transport Layer Security (TLS) digital certificates and Secure Shell (SSH) keys.

Jeff Hudson (current chief executive officer) replaced Rohovit in October 2010, and the company moved to Salt Lake City, UT in 2013. Venafi is headquartered in Salt Lake City, Utah, and has offices in California and the United Kingdom.

In May 2024, CyberArk announced the planned acquisition of Venafi from private equity firm Thoma Bravo for more than $1.5 billion, hoping to close the deal by the end of the year. On October 1, 2024, CyberArk announced that it had completed the transaction.

CyberArk was purchased by Palo Alto on Feb 11th, 2026. The product formerly known as 'Venafi' has been renamed to 'Next-Generation Trust Security' aka NGTS.

== Company name ==
Venafi is a made-up word created by combining two Latin roots—Vena (vein or root) and Fides (trust or faith). Venafi secures the root of trust—the encryption keys and certificates.
