= DoTerra =

American multi-level marketing company

doTerra
- Type: Private
- Industry: Multi-level marketing
- Founded: 2008
- Founders: David Stirling, Mark A. Wolfert, Corey B. Lindley, Dr. David K. Hill, Emily Wright, Gregory P. Cook, Robert J. Young
- Headquarters: Pleasant Grove, Utah, United States
- Area served: International
- Key people: Kirk Jowers, CEO; Murray Smith, President; Emily Wright, Chair of the Board
- Products: Essential oils, skin care, nutrition, health and beauty
- Number of employees: 4,461 (2022)
- Website: www.doterra.com

doTerra (styled dōTERRA or doTERRA) is a multi-level marketing company based in Pleasant Grove, Utah, that sells essential oils and other related products. doTerra was founded in 2008.

The company's products are sold through independent distributors called Wellness Advocates. Distributors are eligible to receive commissions based on their own sales and the sales of others in their organization. This business model is suspected to consist in a pyramidal fraud, and several similar companies have already been convicted.

The company has also received warnings from the Food and Drug Administration and the Federal Trade Commission for misleading claims by its distributors that doTerra products could help prevent or cure diseases such as cancer, autism, Ebola and COVID-19.

== History ==
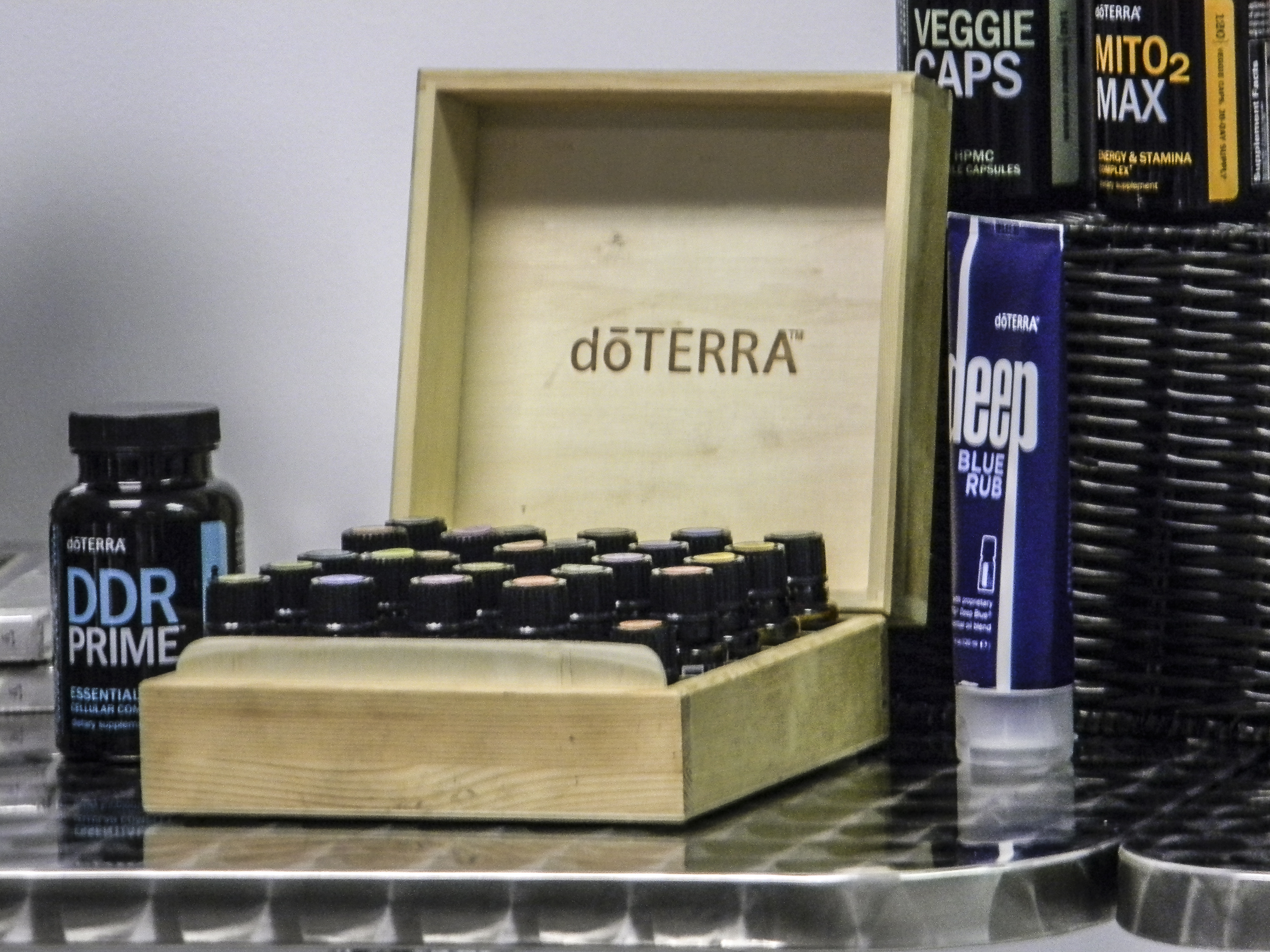
doTerra kit

The company was established in April 2008 by David Stirling, Emily Wright, David Hill, Corey B. Lindley, Gregory P. Cook, Robert J. Young, and Mark A. Wolfert. Its name was inspired by the Latin phrase for "gift of the Earth". The company initially launched with 25 single oils and ten oil blends. Five years after its founding, doTerra reported having about 450 corporate employees, 350 at the Utah headquarters, and 100 at offices in Taiwan, Japan, Europe, and Australia.

In August 2013, Young Living filed suit against doTerra for theft of trade secrets. Stirling, Wright, and Hill were former executives of Young Living. The Fourth District Court dismissed the claims and the companies settled lawsuits against each other. A later ruling ordered Young Living to pay doTerra's legal fees as it had acted in bad faith and misled the court.

In 2014, the company was selling over 150 products such as supplements, personal care items, and essential oils. The company completed construction on its Pleasant Grove, Utah headquarters in July 2014. The number of Wellness Advocates joining the company grew by more than 120 percent the next year. By the end of 2015, the company claimed that it had generated more than $1 billion in sales.

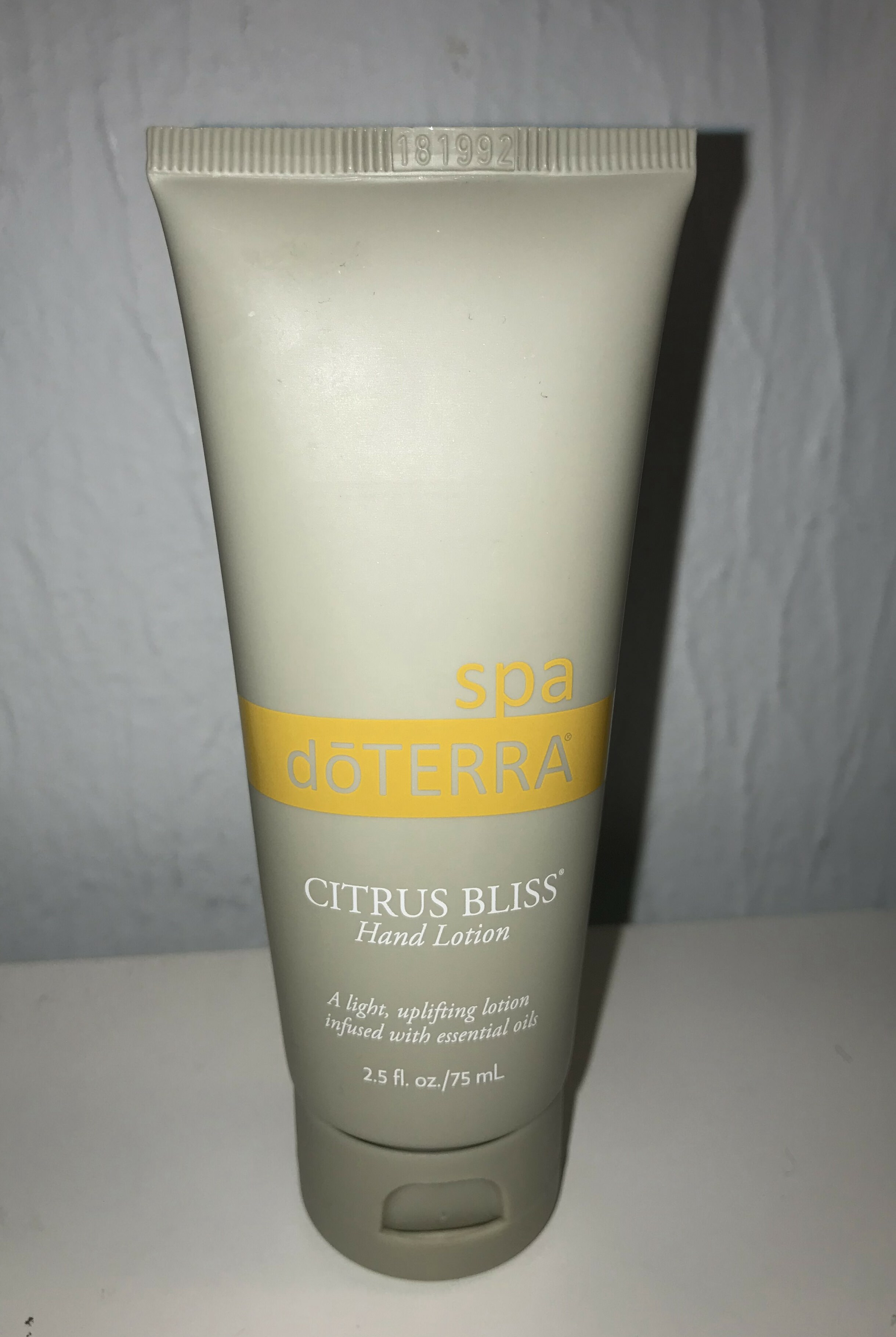
doTerra Citrus Bliss hand lotion

In March 2016, personal information stored in a system was subject to a third-party data breach. doTerra sent letters to distributors the next month informing them of the breach and offered 24 months of credit monitoring through AllClear, a credit monitoring company. doTerra reported having approximately 1,650 corporate employees and over 3 million Wellness Advocates across 100 countries the next year. It recalled 1.3 million bottles of its oils due to a lack of child resistant packaging.

In April 2022, doTerra entered into a $5 million agreement with the University of Mississippi to research essential oils.

In April 2025, doTerra expanded its business into Kazakhstan, holding an event at the Palace of the Republic.

== Controversies ==
doTERRA has faced criticism and several controversies related to its multilevel marketing model, health claims made by distributors, and labor practices in its supply chain.

=== Multi-level marketing and Ponzi scheme ===
Example of a pyramid scheme where each member must recruit six people to recoup their initial investment: due to geometric progression, the second level must have 36 people, the third 216 people, and so on until the thirteenth level exceeds the total number of people on Earth.

The company’s business model has been described by critics as resembling a pyramid or Ponzi scheme, with a small percentage of top distributors earning significant income while the majority of participants make little or no profit. According to a 2019 Marie Claire investigation into the MLM industry, 99 % of people involved in multilevel marketing companies lose money, and the essential oils market has become a major focus of such schemes. Former sellers and consumer advocates have accused doTERRA of exploiting vulnerable individuals, particularly women in wellness and yoga communities, through aggressive recruitment tactics and misleading representations of financial independence and community support. doTERRA has denied operating a fraudulent business and maintains that its model empowers independent entrepreneurs.

Built on the same business model, Young Living (where most of doTERRA's founders come from) is currently the subject of a class action lawsuit in the United States for pyramid fraud. Many others similar companies (Herbalife, LuLaRoe, Advocare, etc.) have already been convicted after leading thousands of “consultants” and other “representatives” into bankruptcy.

On April 24, 2020, the U.S. Federal Trade Commission issued a warning to DoTerra, ordering it to cease and desist from "misrepresent[ing] that consumers who become doTERRA business opportunity participants are likely to earn substantial income" :

Representations about a business opportunity, including earnings claims, violate Section 5 of the FTC Act, 15 U.S.C. § 41 et seq., if they are false, misleading, or unsubstantiated and material to consumers. Express and implied earnings claims must be truthful and non-misleading to avoid being deceptive, which means that claims about the potential to achieve a wealthy lifestyle, career-level income, or significant income are false or misleading if business opportunity participants generally do not achieve such results. Even truthful testimonials from participants who do earn significant income or more will likely be misleading unless the advertising also makes clear the amount earned or lost by most participants.

— Federal Trade Commission to DoTerra, April 24, 2020.

=== Supply chain ===
The company has also faced allegations regarding the treatment of workers in its supply chain.

More than a dozen women working for doTerra’s frankincense supplier, a Somaliland company called Asli Maydi, reported poor pay, sexual abuse and unhealthy work conditions. According to the Fuller Project, the abuse continued for years after victims contacted doTerra. The company suspended its operations in Somaliland and launched an independent investigation into the allegations.

But some of the women who say they worked for Asli Maydi and its owner, Barkhad Hassan, say doTERRA’s actions have not only failed to deliver justice for them, but have placed them in further danger from their former employer. (23 July 2024)

=== Distributor claims ===
On September 22, 2014, the U.S. Food and Drug Administration (FDA) issued an FDA Warning Letter to doTerra for its distributors marketing products as possible treatments or cures for Ebola, cancer, autism, and other conditions in violation of the Food, Drug and Cosmetic Act. Federal agents conducted an investigation of doTerra's files.

Some distributors have promoted the company's products for air purification and protection against the health effects of smoke from the California wildfires. It was alleged in 2018 that some distributors had offered personal stories to customers claiming that their child had benefited from essential oils.

In 2020, some doTerra distributors attempted to benefit from public concern regarding COVID-19 by claiming that the company's products have immune-boosting properties, despite no scientific evidence to support such claims. The Federal Trade Commission (FTC) warned the company it must stop making such unfounded health claims and exaggerated earnings by its distributors.

In 2023, the U.S. Department of Justice, on behalf of the FTC, won lawsuits against three doTerra distributors for making claims that the company’s essential oils and dietary supplements could treat, prevent, or cure COVID-19, in violation of the FTC Act and the COVID-19 Consumer Protection Act. According to the court order, the defendants were prohibited from making further claims that doTerra products can prevent, cure, or treat without FDA approval; ordered to provide reliable human clinical testing to support claims about other diseases; prohibited from mispresenting that the product’s benefits are scientifically or clinically proven; and were required to pay a $15,000 civil penalty.

== Projects ==
=== doTerra Healing Hands Foundation ===
The doTerra Healing Hands Foundation is a 501(c)(3) non-profit organization established by doTerra in 2012. In 2016, the foundation partnered with the non-profit organization Choice Humanitarian to send staff and distributors to Nepal and Guatemala to install vented brick stoves for families.

In 2017, the doTerra Healing Hands organization began collecting donations from its distributors in the wake of Hurricane Harvey to cover the costs of providing relief packs containing samples of the company's products to evacuees in Dallas. In October 2017, Pacific Standard reported that after collecting donations, doTerra did not deliver the shipments, allegedly due to weather conditions, and described the incident as "a modern example of malfeasance masquerading as altruism—a type of scam often found in multi-level marketing organizations." In an update to their report in March 2018, Pacific Standard noted that doTerra did eventually send shipments of doTerra hygiene packs to residents in Houston.

=== Kealakekua Mountain Reserve ===
In 2018, the company purchased $7.3 million of land in the Kealakekua Mountain Reserve to source its sandalwood on Hawaii's Big Island. doTerra announced a 10-year plan to use dead sandalwood for its essential oil production while keeping 75 percent of the land forested. It built a nursery on the reserve to grow saplings and protect them from tree-killing species. doTerra has planted 300,000 native trees and intends to plant more than 1 million by 2030.

== Recognition ==
doTerra was recognized by Hope for Haiti with the Hope Award in January 2023. The company's distillery in Bulgaria was awarded "Partner of the Municipality" by the Annual Awards Association of the Bulgarian Municipalities for its work in the country.

It received a Good Housekeeping 2025 Bath Award. doTerra was recognized by Oprah Daily for "best essential oils" of 2026.
