= EFileCabinet =

Document management software company

eFileCabinet, Inc.
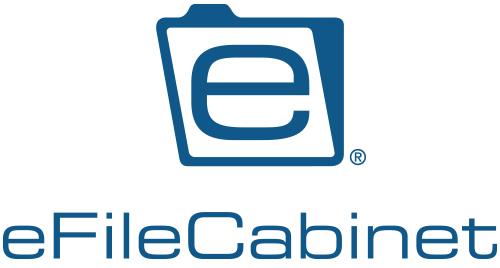
- Type: Private
- Industry: document management software, enterprise content management
- Founded: 2001
- Headquarters: Lehi, Utah
- Key people: Jesse Wood, President; CEO
- Products: eFileCabinet Online 2016 eFileCabinet On-Premise 2016; SecureDrawer Web Portal eFileCabinet SideKick; Enterprise Access
- Website: www.efilecabinet.com

eFileCabinet is a SaaS-based company headquartered in Lehi, Utah, selling document management software to manage and store documents, content, and records, either on-site or in the cloud.

It was founded in 2001 by James Blaylock to serve clients in the accounting industry where Blaylock worked before founding the company. It has since expanded to service many other industries, including construction, banking, healthcare, insurance, law, manufacturing, retail, oil & gas, transportation, and education. As of January 2016, eFileCabinet had over 160,000 users.

== History ==
eFileCabinet software began as an internal product designed to store digital records at founder James Blaylock's accounting firm. Word spread about Blaylock's new software, generating demand for the software among other accounting firms. In response to this demand, Blaylock founded eFileCabinet in 2001 to build upon, improve, and market the software.

On July 21, 2007, Matt Peterson replaced James Blaylock as president and CEO of the company. Peterson had served as chief operating officer since joining the company in January 2007. Blaylock moved to serve as chairman of the board.

In 2008, eFileCabinet received $1 million in venture capital from Canopy Ventures, an early-stage venture capital firm. This allowed eFileCabinet to expand from servicing only accounting firms to various other industries, including government, healthcare, finance, and insurance. In June 2015, the company received a combined $14 million in Series B venture capital funding from California-based venture capital firm Allegis Capital and Signal Peak Ventures in Utah, bringing the company's total funding to $26.05 million. In 2020, they closed a Series C funding round with $11.5 million.

== Products ==
eFileCabinet provides a suite of proprietary software products and services in the form of paperless document management.

In 2016, eFileCabinet opted out of Microsoft Silverlight as its framework of choice for its products, using HTML 5 instead to increase integration with the company's web sharing portal, SecureDrawer, and other third-party software like Sage, Foxit, Caselle, and QuickBooks.

eFileCabinet released the SideKick (a supporting application for the eFileCabinet software) in 2016. eFileCabinet also released an updated version of Enterprise Access (a satellite/remote access tool for larger organizations), and zonal optical character recognition (OCR), which enables users to scan and read specific portions of documents. eFileCabinet also released software in 2016 that is Mac OS X compatible.

Below is a list of products, including their main functions:

1. eFileCabinet Desktop 2016: An on-premise document management solution
2. eFileCabinet Online 2016: A cloud-based document management solution
3. SecureDrawer: A web and client sharing portal for exchanging sensitive information
4. The eFileCabinet SideKick: A connector of eFileCabinet software and the desktop that comes with a computer's operating system
5. Enterprise Access: A satellite/remote access tool for organizations with multiple branches, and or office locations
6. Rubex: The latest iteration of the eFileCabinet Online document management solution, which includes the file-sharing functionality of SecureDrawer within the interface.

== See also ==
- Document management system
- Records Management
- Business process management
- Document imaging
- Enterprise content management
- Cloud software
- Paperless office
