= List of multi-level marketing companies =

List of companies which use multi-level marketing

This is a list of companies which use multi-level marketing (also known as network marketing, direct selling, referral marketing, and pyramid selling) for most of their sales.

== Active ==
- 5Linx
- ACN Inc.
- AdvoCare
- Ambit Energy
- American Income Life Insurance Company
- Amsoil
- Amway
- Amway Global, previously known as Quixtar
- Ann Summers
- Arbonne International
- Avon Products
- Barefoot Books
- Beachbody
- BioPerformance
- The Body Shop
- Cutco
- Discovery Toys
- doTerra
- Educo Seminar
- Forever Living Products
- FreeLife
- Fuel Freedom International
- Herbalife
- Isagenix International
- Juice Plus
- LegalShield, previously known as Pre-Paid Legal Services
- LifeVantage (Protandim)
- LimeLife
- Longrich
- LuLaRoe
- Lyoness
- Mannatech
- Market America
- Mary Kay
- Medifast
- Melaleuca
- Monat
- Morinda, Inc.
- National Safety Associates
- Nature's Sunshine Products
- Neal's Yard Remedies Organic
- Nu Skin Enterprises
- Omnilife
- Oriflame
- Pampered Chef
- PM-International
- Primerica
- Pure Romance
- Qnet, previously known as QuestNet, GoldQuest, and QI Limited
- Rodan + Fields
- Scentsy
- Seacret
- SeneGence
- Shaklee
- Southwestern Advantage
- Stream Energy
- Success University
- Sunrider
- Swarovski Touchstone Crystal
- Tastefully Simple
- Telecom Plus and its main subsidiary Utility Warehouse
- Tupperware
- USANA Health Sciences
- Usborne Publishing
- Vector Marketing
- Vemma
- ViSalus
- Wakaya Perfection
- Watkins Incorporated
- World Financial Group
- XanGo
- Young Living
- Younique
- YTB International

== Defunct ==
- Beautycounter (dissolved in 2024)
- Betterware (placed into administration in 2018)
- Black Oxygen Organics (shut down in November 2021)
- BurnLounge (shut down as pyramid scheme by FTC in 2012)
- Equinox International (dissolved in 2001)
- European Grouping of Marketing Professionals/CEDIPAC SA (dissolved in 1995)
- European Home Retail (dissolved in 2007)
- Excel Communications (filed for Chapter 11 bankruptcy in 2004)
- Fortune Hi-Tech Marketing (dissolved in 2013)
- FundAmerica (bankrupt in 1990)
- Holiday Magic (dissolved in 1974)
- House of Lloyd (a.k.a. "Christmas Around the World") (filed for Chapter 11 bankruptcy in 2002)
- Kleeneze (went into administration in 2018)
- The Longaberger Company (dissolved in 2018)
- Metabolife (dissolved in 2005)
- MonaVie (went into foreclosure 2015)
- Nouveau Riche (real estate investment college) (dissolved in 2010)
- NXIVM
- Seasilver (ceased trading in 2006)
- Solavei (dissolved in 2015)
- Royal Tongan Limu (dissolved in 2003)
- Sunshine Empire (dissolved in 2009)
- Telexfree (bankrupt in 2014)
- United Sciences of America (dissolved in 1987)
- WakeUpNow (dissolved in 2015)
