= Vegas Matt =

American gambler and internet personality

- Born: Stephen Matt Morrow; October 4, 1963 (age 63); Orinda, California, U.S.
- Occupations: YouTuber; live streamer; gambler
- Years active: 2021–present

YouTube information
- Channel: Vegas Matt
- Subscribers: 1.61 million
- Views: 1.421 billion
- Last updated: July 26, 2026
- Website: www.vegasmatt.com

Stephen Matt Morrow (born October 4, 1963), known professionally as Vegas Matt, is an American gambler and internet personality. With more than one million YouTube subscribers and Instagram followers, he is known for wagering large sums of money on games of chance in Las Vegas, primarily at the El Cortez Hotel & Casino.

Although he has described working as a bed and breakfast operator and Hollywood film producer, including as financier of the 1988 film Night of the Demons, his wealth came primarily from participation in the multi-level marketing schemes FundAmerica and Vemma. He is currently a spokesman for FanDuel.
