= FFI =

FFI may refer to:

== Entertainment ==
- Festival Film Indonesia, Indonesia
- Final Fantasy (video game), or Final Fantasy I, 1987
- Final Fight (video game), 1989

== Language ==
- ﬃ, a typographical ligature
- Foia Foia language, spoken in Papua New Guinea

== Organizations ==
- Family Firm Institute
- Fauna and Flora International, a conservation group
- Fellow of the Flag Institute
- Film Federation of India
- Finlay Forest Industries, a defunct Canadian forest products company
- Franciscan Friars of the Immaculate, a Roman Catholic institute of religious life
- Frederikshavn fI, a Danish sport club
- Free File, Inc., an American consortium of tax preparation companies
- French Forces of the Interior (French: Forces Françaises de l'Intérieur), French resistance fighters during World War II
- Fuel Freedom International, an American multi-level marketing company
- Norwegian Defence Research Establishment (Norwegian: Forsvarets forskningsinstitutt), a Norwegian military R&D institute

== Science and technology ==
- Fatal insomnia, a fatal neurological disorder
- Foreign function interface, in computing

== Other ==
- A fee for intervention charged in the United Kingdom by the Health and Safety Executive
- Free Fees Initiative, Ireland, government funding of undergraduate fees in some circumstances
