= MonaVie =

American multi-level marketing company

- Type: Private
- Industry: Multi-level marketing; Food & beverage; Dietary supplements
- Founded: (January 2005; 21 years ago) in South Jordan, Utah, United States
- Fate: Foreclosed in 2015
- Headquarters: Salt Lake City, Utah, United States
- Area served: Worldwide
- Key people: Dallin Larsen (Founder & chairman); Henry Marsh (Founder & vice-chairman); Maurício Bellora (CEO)
- Products: MonaVie Active; MonaVie Essential; MonaVie Pulse
- Number of employees: 450 (from 2009)
- Subsidiaries: The MORE Project
- Website: www.monavie.com

MonaVie is a defunct, American multi-level marketing company that manufactured and distributed products made from blended fruit juice concentrates, powders, and purées. The company was the subject of several controversies. Health claims for its products had not been scientifically confirmed or approved by regulatory authorities, and its chairman had been previously involved in false health claims concerning another beverage company. According to Forbes, MonaVie's business plan resembled a pyramid scheme. In 2015, the company defaulted on a US$182 million loan and went into foreclosure. Florida-based Jeunesse Global took over MonaVie’s assets when it purchased the note for $15 million.

== Company overview ==
Dallin Larsen, who held senior executive positions with the multi-level marketing companies Dynamic Essentials and USANA, founded Monarch Health Sciences in 2003 as a distributor of diet and weight loss supplements. Monarch Health Sciences launched MonaVie juice in January 2005, and the same year founded MonaVie LLC/MonaVie Inc., a privately held multi-level marketing company based in South Jordan, Utah. The newly formed company took over the bottling, distribution, and marketing of MonaVie juice products. MonaVie also owned and operated a charity organization, The MORE Project.

MonaVie products were sold by non-employee distributors who were eligible to receive commissions based on product sales. Individual distributors were encouraged to build their own sales networks by recruiting new distributors to sell the products (referred to in multi-level marketing parlance as a "downline"); the recruiter could have, in theory, received additional commissions based on sales by their downlines.

== Products ==
MonaVie produced a variety of blended bottled fruit juices, carbonated energy drinks, dietary supplements and dieting products. MonaVie Kosher, one of the company's juice products, was certified as kosher according to Jewish dietary laws by the Orthodox Union of North America and the Chief Rabbinate of Israel.

=== Product research and physiological context ===
An analysis conducted by contract laboratory ChromaDex indicated that MonaVie contained low levels of antioxidant vitamin C and of phytochemicals such as anthocyanins and phenolics associated with antioxidant activity in test tubes.

MonaVie promoted that the juice had key polyphenol antioxidants from açai and other fruits in the blend; however, there is no physiological evidence that any fruit polyphenols have such actions in humans or that oxygen radical absorbance capacity (ORAC) has any relevance in the human body. Research shows that although polyphenols are good antioxidants in vitro, antioxidant effects in vivo are probably negligible or absent. As interpreted by the United States Food and Drug Administration, Linus Pauling Institute and European Food Safety Authority, dietary polyphenols have little or no direct antioxidant food value after digestion. Unlike controlled test tube conditions, most polyphenols are not absorbed following digestion, and what is absorbed is metabolized and excreted.

=== Interactions and adverse effects ===
A clinical case report showed an association between MonaVie ingestion throughout pregnancy and prenatal closure of the ductus arteriosus resulting in cardiac hypertrophy and dysfunction (pulmonary hypertension) at birth. Another case report noted that MonaVie Active may cause fluctuations in blood clotting (prothrombin time) in patients treated with warfarin or other coumadin blood thinners, and it was recommended that this combination should be avoided.

== Distributor earnings ==
Around 14% of distributors made a profit, according to MonaVie Executive VP Henry Marsh quoted from a 2009 Deseret News article. A Newsweek article, reporting on MonaVie's 2007 Income disclosure statement, stated "fewer than 1% qualified for commissions and of those, only 10% made more than $100 a week." More than 90% were counted as wholesale customers, whose earnings were mostly discounts on sales to themselves. According to a top recruiter, the dropout rate in 2008 was around 70%. An article published in the Hartford Courant reported that about 45% of the company's distributors earned an annualized average check of less than $1,600, and 37% took home about $2,000; roughly 2% earned an annualized average check of more than $29,000, and just 7 out of 80,000 distributors (<0.01%) took home more than $3 million, according to MonaVie's 2008 Income Disclosure statement. According to a 2011 article in The Salt Lake Tribune, 85% of MonaVie's distributors earned commission checks in 2009 averaging $35 a week or less, while the company's top seven distributors earned an average of $3.4 million a year.

== Criticism ==
=== Nutritional value ===
Physician Andrew Weil and nutritionist Jonny Bowden claimed that the nutritional and health benefits of MonaVie juice were unproven and that the product was overpriced relative to more cost-effective conventional polyphenol-rich foods. Weil and Bowden also criticized the product for being sold through multi-level marketing. A Men’s Journal nutritional analysis showed that MonaVie Active juice "tested extremely low in anthocyanins and phenolics" and that "even apple juice (which also tested poorly) has more phenolics". The report also noted that "MonaVie’s vitamin C level was 5 times lower than that of Welch’s Grape Juice", a product priced at a fraction of the cost of MonaVie for the same serving volume. Ralph Carson, the original developer of MonaVie and the company’s chief science officer cautioned that the juice was "expensive flavored water" and that “any claims made are purely hypothetical, unsubstantiated and, quite frankly, bogus." Carson added that he did not know how much açai was in the product.

=== Misleading advertising and health claims ===
Bowden, Newsweek correspondent Tony Dokoupil, Palm Beach Post reporter Carolyn Susman, and Salt Lake City Tribune correspondent Tom Harvey commented on the use of misleading promotional testimonials by MonaVie distributors in which the product was said to prevent and treat a variety of medical conditions. Harvey also stated that MonaVie's rise, based on odds "stacked against low-level distributors who poured in the billions of dollars that fueled the company's spectacular growth," raised questions about the foundations of other companies in Utah's nutritional supplement industry. In 2007, the US Food and Drug Administration (FDA) issued an FDA Warning Letter to MonaVie distributor Kevin Vokes, for violations of the Federal Food, Drug and Cosmetic Act relating to online promotional material claiming that MonaVie was an effective treatment for inflammation, high cholesterol, and muscle and joint pain. The FDA considered the issue resolved after therapeutic claims on the offending website were scaled down. In a 2008 Forbes magazine article, reporters Emily Lambert and Klaus Kneale described MonaVie as a pyramid scheme, referencing a video testimonial by distributor Louis "Lou" B. Niles that implied the product could cure cancer.

Company executives had repeatedly acknowledged ongoing problems with MonaVie distributors making unlawful claims that the juice can treat and prevent diseases. In a 2008 Newsweek article, CEO Dallin Larsen stated that "his sales team can get him in hot water with the Feds", and that it was "next to impossible" for the company to investigate distributors suspected of making false claims. Later in 2008, the company issued a statement acknowledging that many of its distributors, "perhaps unwittingly", violated its advertising policies. In a 2009 Bloomberg News article, MonaVie executive vice-president and cofounder Randy Larsen stated that "the company is struggling with independent distributors who promote the juice as a miracle drug."

=== Dallin Larsen and Dynamic Essentials/Royal Tongan Limu ===
MonaVie CEO and founder Dallin Larsen was a senior executive with an multi-level marketing company that sold a similar juice product prior to being shut down by the FDA for illegal business practices. In 2001, Larsen became vice president of sales for Dynamic Essentials, a Florida-based company selling a fruit juice called Royal Tongan Limu, where Larsen claimed to have increased revenue 300%. In 2002, during Larsen’s tenure, the FDA warned Dynamic Essentials that claims on the company’s website that the juice could "treat various diseases such as cancer, arthritis, and attention deficit disorder" were illegal. Dynamic Essentials ceased operating soon after. In 2003, the FDA saw the voluntary destruction of 90,000 bottles of Royal Tongan Limu.

=== Pyramid scheme allegations ===
In 2008, Larsen formed a business partnership with former Amway distributor (Quixtar in the US) Orrin Woodward, founder of an Amway distributor sales network company known as TEAM. Woodward subsequently became a distributor and speaker for MonaVie, mixing his TEAM organization structure and distributor sales tools (e.g. sales brochures, audio/video recordings, etc.) concept with MonaVie's compensation plan. Woodward received a $3 million loan from MonaVie which he did not have to repay if he met certain recruiting distributor goals, according to a lawsuit Amway filed against MonaVie in 2008. A Forbes magazine article in 2008 described MonaVie as a pyramid scheme, and TEAM as "a pyramid atop a pyramid", in which MonaVie vendors were sold motivational lectures, using a multi-level model, which were purported to help them increase their sales of MonaVie's products. The article proposes that this system takes advantage of ambiguities in the Federal Trade Commission's regulation of pyramid schemes, and that only 1% of members make any money from their involvement with the company.

== Litigation ==
The company, its executives, and various senior distributors have been part of significant lawsuits since the company's founding. MonaVie was the defendant in a false-advertising/trademark infringement suit against Imagenetix, Inc (2008), a multi-issue legal battle with Quixtar/Amway (2008), a false advertising suit by Oprah Winfrey and Mehmet Oz (2009), two class action lawsuits (2010, 2013), and a copyright infringement suit against Zrii (2010). Also, MonaVie filed several suits against former sales representatives for breach of contract.

=== Trademark infringement and false advertising cases ===
In 2008, Imagenetix, Inc. sued the MonaVie company, its board of directors, and several of its senior distributors for $2.75 billion over trademark infringement alleging that MonaVie Active juice contained the ingredient Celadrin. The case was settled out of court and the lawsuit was dropped. Soon after, Imagenetix announced that it had entered into a new business relationship with MonaVie, the terms of which were not disclosed.

In 2010, MonaVie sued Zrii, a competing multilevel marketing drink company, claiming that Zrii copied its distributor compensation plan. MonaVie sought an injunction to prevent Zrii from continuing to use the plan, force the destruction of all the existing copies of the plan, and claim damages.

In 2009, television celebrities Oprah Winfrey and Dr. Mehmet Oz filed lawsuits against 40 companies who sold açaí or related products. The parties alleged that the companies had fabricated quotes "falsely purporting to speak in Dr. Oz's and/or Ms. Winfrey's voice about specific brands and products that neither of them has endorsed." MonaVie was one of the defendants. Winfrey’s website stated that “consumers should be aware that neither Oprah Winfrey nor Dr. Oz are associated with nor do they endorse any açaí berry product, company or online solicitation of such products, including MonaVie juice products."

In 2010, a class action lawsuit was filed against MonaVie in the Circuit Court of Miller County, Arkansas, alleging that MonaVie and its distributors, through the use of false and misleading advertising had engaged in civil conspiracy and other criminal activities.

In 2013, a class action lawsuit was filed against MonaVie in the US District Court of New Jersey alleging that the company had used unfair and deceptive business practices, and false advertising, in violation of the New Jersey Consumer Fraud Act. According to the lawsuit, MonaVie and its distributors used false and misleading claims of curative benefits to promote the company’s juice products, which were sold at an unjustly inflated price. In 2014, a similar class action lawsuit was filed against MonaVie in the US District Court of Southern Florida. The suit alleged that the company had deceptively advertising its juices, such as MonaVie Active, MonaVie Essential, MonaVie Pulse. According to the complaint, the company had promised that its juices would provide a variety of health benefits, including increased energy and improved joint health, without scientific proof to support such claims. In addition, the plaintiffs claimed that the company failed to warn consumers that the juices contain ingredients – such as arsenic and lead – that could cause health problems.

In 2014, K2A LLC, a company formed by Alex Schauss and Kenneth Murdock, filed a lawsuit claiming that MonaVie owed tens of millions of dollars for infringing on a patent held by K2A for the freeze-dried açai berry used in MonaVie's products. K2A claimed that they had terminated their 2004 licensing agreement on Oct. 18, 2013 and that MonaVie continued to sell products that infringed on the patents. The lawsuit alleged that MonaVie had not made any royalty payments since June 2009 and failed to deliver shares in the company that were promised to K2A. The court was petitioned to declare that the licensing agreement has been terminated and to award K2A at least 10 percent of MonaVie’s gross sales, plus triple damages. In January 2015, MonaVie announced that it had settled the case for an undisclosed sum.

=== Dispute with Amway ===
In 2008 Quixtar, a sister company of Amway, filed a multi-count federal court complaint against the MonaVie company and 16 of its top-level distributors who had previously worked with Amway. The complaint alleged that MonaVie competed unfairly by making false claims about its products, and that the former distributors had violated their contracts with Amway. Shortly after, MonaVie filed a lawsuit with the Utah district court asking for a ruling as to whether Quixtar had been over-reaching the boundaries of its non-compete agreements and to address whether or not such agreements are enforceable for independent distributors. MonaVie filed to dismiss the Amway/Quixtar lawsuit. Later in 2008, MonaVie et al. filed a lawsuit in the Colorado District Court against Quixtar. Amway and MonaVie settled in 2010 before trial.

In 2009, Orrin Woodward and his wife Laurie were found liable in an arbitration case for soliciting other distributors to resign from Quixtar and join its competitor MonaVie, The Woodwards were ordered to pay a settlement of $12,736,659. Co-defendants Chris and Terri Brandy were ordered to pay $9,578,756 and Tim and Amy Marks, $3,533,230.

=== Lawsuits with former distributors ===
In 2012 the company sought legal action against Joseph Licciardi and several other distributors for breach of contract by allegedly attempting to recruit MonaVie distributors to competing multilevel marketing companies. In April 2015, an arbitrator awarded Licciardi $1.2 million, ruling that MonaVie breached its contract by revoking Liccardi's distributorship.

=== Loan default and foreclosure ===
In May 2014 it was announced that MonaVie had defaulted on a $182 million note securing assets of the company. The note was issued in 2010 by TSG-MV Financing LLC, part of TSG Consumer Partners of San Francisco and then purchased in March 2015 by multi-level marketing company Jeunesse Global of Altamonte Springs, Florida. On May 11, a Federal court judge issued a temporary restraining order to halt the takeover of MonaVie by Jeunesse Global. The petition had been filed by Bankers Trust, the trustee overseeing MonaVie's employee stock ownership program (ESOP) which had become a major holder of MonaVie stock, noting that the foreclosure would render the ESOP worthless.
