= Nick Denes Field =

Baseball park at Western Kentucky University

- Interactive map of Nick Denes Field
- Address: 428 University Boulevard; Bowling Green, Kentucky; United States
- Coordinates: 36.983622°N 86.461150°W
- Owner: Western Kentucky University
- Operator: Western Kentucky University
- Capacity: 1,500
- Surface: Astroturf
- Field size: Left Field: 330 ft (100 m); Left-Center Field: 370 ft (110 m); Center Field: 400 ft (120 m); Right-Center Field: 370 ft (110 m); Right Field: 330 ft (100 m)

Construction
- Opened: 1969
- Renovated: 2010

Tenant
- Western Kentucky Hilltoppers baseball (NCAA) (1969-present)

Website
- Nick Denes Field

Nick Denes Field is a baseball venue located on the campus of Western Kentucky University in Bowling Green, Kentucky, United States. It is home to the Western Kentucky Hilltoppers baseball team, a member of the NCAA Division I Conference USA. The field has a capacity of 1,500 people, 1,000 of which consists of chair-backed seating. In 2010, $1 million renovations added the Paul C. Orberson Baseball Clubhouse. The clubhouse is located down the left field at the venue.

== See also ==
- List of NCAA Division I baseball venues
