= Market America =

American multi-level marketing company

- Type: Private
- Founded: 1992
- Founders: James Howard Ridinger; Loren Ridinger
- Headquarters: Greensboro, North Carolina, United States
- Area served: Worldwide
- Key people: James Howard Ridinger (President and CEO)
- Revenue: USD 791.1 million (2016)
- Total assets: USD 146.1 million (2010)
- Number of employees: 800 (as of 2016)
- Website: www.marketamerica.com

Market America (also Market America Worldwide) is an American multi-level marketing company based in Greensboro, North Carolina. Founded in 1992 by J. R. Ridinger and his wife, Loren Ridinger, it sells dietary supplements, cosmetics, jewelry, household and weight-management products through independent distributors. It owned the online shopping site Shop.com from 2011 until September 2026, when it sold the domain to Shopify and moved its online store to MarketAmerica.com. J. R. Ridinger died in August 2022, and Loren Ridinger is chief executive.

The company has faced criticism and litigation over its business model. A 2017 proposed class action alleged that it operated as an illegal pyramid scheme; in 2019 a federal court ordered the claims into arbitration. In 2020 the nonprofit Truth in Advertising identified more than 450 income claims the company had published that year, along with about 300 older ones, that it considered deceptive. After the group warned that it would notify regulators, the company removed nearly all of them.

== History ==
Market America was founded in 1992 by former Amway distributor James Howard Ridinger and his wife Loren Ridinger. The company is headquartered in Greensboro, North Carolina and employed over 800 employees as of 2016. Over the years, the company has sold items such as auto care, electronics, apparel, water filtration systems, flowers, coffee, and oral hygiene through affiliations with outside companies that advertise and offer these items on the firm's site.

In 2001, the company went private after James and Loren Ridinger purchased all of its outstanding shares. It had initially been publicly traded since 1994.

In late 2010, the company bought shopping comparison firm Shop.com for an undisclosed amount.

In July 2021, Market America announced its partnership with Verb Technology, Inc., a company that provides interactive video-based sales enablement applications, including interactive livestream ecommerce. Market America began to use Verb's services to provide its distributors with interactive, live-stream broadcasts that have a “click now” feature that is available to customers interested in purchasing products during the live broadcast. It was to be made available to all company distributors worldwide.

In August 2021, Market America announced its partnership with Sezzle, a financial technology and publicly traded company with a “buy now, pay later” online payment provider, where shoppers can pay for their total purchase in four installments over six weeks with zero interest.

== Products and services ==
Market America's product categories include health and nutrition (Isotonix), home and garden care (Snap), pet care (Pet Health), automotive care (Autoworks), weight management (TLS), personal care (Royal Spa, Fixx, Skintelligence), cosmetics (Motives by Loren Ridinger), jewelry (Loren Jewels, Yours by Loren Ridinger), and water filter systems (Pure H_{2}O). Services include personal financial management (maCapital Resources) and Internet marketing services for small to medium-sized businesses (maWebCenters).

The firm's Isotonix line of dietary supplements was introduced in 1993, and came to include more than 20 products. Its Prime line consists of 12 supplement formulations. In 2004, the Transitions Lifestyle System (TLS) weight management program was introduced.

== Business model ==
According to Market America, all of its products are manufactured by other firms and are exclusively marketed by Market America. The company refers to individual persons and business entities as independent distributors or "UnFranchise Business Owners" who may also operate online retail websites called "Partner Stores". Individual distributors pay startup and monthly fees, and are expected to recruit others.

Market America distributors are eligible to earn money from product sales commissions and recruiting new members to their sales team. In June 2017, the startup fee to become a Market America distributor was reportedly $399 plus additional monthly payments of $129. Market America representatives operate as independent contractors, but are required to spend between $130 and $300 on Market America products and attend seminars and training events that are estimated to cost between $20 and $200 each.

Market America has been criticized as an "incarnation of multilevel marketing" whose products are "almost interchangeable with what you could find in your local CVS or Duane Reade for half the price" and as a business driven by "distributors finding customers, introducing them to Market America products, and then explaining to them that by selling this product, they can become as wealthy as, well, JR Ridinger."

In 2004, consumer awareness group president Robert FitzPatrick commented that based on available figures, the company's growth "could not go on forever" and disputed the claim that "distributors can achieve financial independence".

In 2010, Market America began acquisition of Shop.com, a shopping comparison site on the Internet. The acquisition combined shop.com's database technology with Market America's Cashback program and network of independent distributors ("Independent Shop Consultants"). Market America was to remain in Greensboro, N.C. and the previous shop.com staff were to remain in Monterey, California and London, UK. In September 2011, the two-step integration process was half-complete.

== Legal actions and lawsuits ==
In a 2017 federal lawsuit, two distributors accused the company of violating the Racketeering Influenced and Corrupt Organizations Act and California state law. The lawsuit calls Market America a pyramid scheme, noting Market America's claim that "the only way to fail under MarketAmerica’s business model is to quit." The suit claims the company targets Chinese-American immigrants to sell products to friends and relatives in Asia. The lawsuit characterizes Market America's business practice as "racketeering" and says that "while the executives tell distributors they can earn more than $560,000, only those at the top make that kind of money. Ninety percent of sellers do not receive a penny". In April 2019, the California case was transferred to a court in North Carolina and consolidated with another suit.

In 2020, Truth In Advertising started an investigation into Market America. The investigation found that "in the first nine months of 2020, Market America published more than 450 deceptive income claims across its website, blog and social media pages". According to the organization, "As a 28-year veteran of the MLM industry with seasoned lawyers on staff, Market America should not have to be reminded of the rules. And the rules state that using atypical earnings claims to recruit distributors is not only deceptive, it's against FTC law". The investigation resulted in Market America removing approximately 750 marketing claims from various media.

== In popular culture ==
In a 2016 episode of Last Week Tonight, host John Oliver featured Market America in a segment on multi level marketing scams.
