= Federal Trade Commission v. Vemma Nutrition Company =

Federal Trade Commission v. Vemma Nutrition Co.
- Court: United States District Court for the District of Arizona
- Full case name: Federal Trade Commission v. Vemma Nutrition Company
- Docket nos.: 2:15-cv-01578

Court membership
- Judge sitting: John Joseph Tuchi

Federal Trade Commission v. Vemma Nutrition Company, No. 2:15-cv-01578, was a case heard in United States District Court for the District of Arizona. On August 17, 2015, the Federal Trade Commission for the United States filed a complaint for the preliminary injunction and for other equitable relief of Vemma Nutrition Company.. The FTC, under Section 13(b) of the Federal Trade Commission Act filed for the permanent injunction of Vemma and alleged Vemma in violation of Section 5(a) of the FTC Act, 15 U.S.C § 45 (a) in connection with the advertising, marketing, promotion, and sale of opportunities to sell health and wellness drinks. The FTC alleged Vemma Nutrition Company of running an illegal pyramid scheme dependent on targeting young adults and recruitment tactics that emphasize the importance of becoming an "affiliate" and purchasing "affiliate packs" and monthly auto-delivery supply packs. Vemma further emphasizes the importance of affiliates to recruit others and "teach them to duplicate this process," offering "bonuses" as incentive for doing so. Vemma CEO Benson K. Boreyko claimed in his recruitment presentations that there is a potential for affiliates to "earn up to $50,000 a month working part time." The FTC found that affiliates are unlikely to earn substantial income and suffer, therefore being misled to participate in a deceptive act in violation of Section 5(a) of the FTC Act, 15 U.S.C § 45 (a).

== Findings ==
In the matter of granting this preliminary injunction, the Court cited Section 13(b) of the FTC Act. This Act allows for the implementation of an injunction depending on the FTC's likelihood of success and the injunctions ability to best serve the public interest.

In deciding whether to grant preliminary relief the court must consider (a) the likelihood that the FTC will ultimately succeed on the merits; and (b) balance the equities.

On August 21, 2015, the United States District Court for the District of Arizona found:

The FTC has shown a likelihood that it will ultimately succeed on the merits. Based on the evidence presented there is good cause to believe that defendants have violated Section 5(a) of the FTC Act by:

A. Operating an illegal pyramid scheme;

B. Falsely representing that the "Affiliates" of Vemma Company are likely to earn a substantial income;

C. A failure to disclose Vemma's company structure which ensures most Vemma Affiliates inability to earn a substantial income; and

D. Providing its Affiliates the necessary means and instruments for the implementation of deceptive acts by providing Affiliates with misleading and false promotional material which is then used to recruit new participants

The Court further decided a proper balance of equities in this matter favor the FTC:

a) There is good cause based upon the evidence provided that:

i)Defendants are violating and will continue to violate Section 5(a) of the FTC Act

ii) Consumers nationwide have suffered and will continue to suffer economic harm as a result this violation

iii) Defendants have received and will continue to receive ill-gotten gains

b) The Court finds that the public interest is best served by:

i) Enjoining deceptive acts and practices in which violate the law

ii) Maintaining the status quo over assets and business documents until a hearing is held

iii) Preserving the Court's ability to reward full and final relief upon the trial of this matter

- The private interests of the Defendants do not outweigh that of the public
- The Federal Rules of Civil Procedure allow for the Court to administer an ex parte temporary restraining order granting the temporary restraining order and asset freeze on Vemma.

== Court's decision to grant continuation of preliminary injunction ==
This preliminary injunction and asset freeze expired on September 18, 2015. On September 15, 2015, FTC presented the evidence found in request to the preliminary injunction over Vemma before the Court and the Court had found the FTC has met the required attributes to grant the FTC in part a preliminary injunction. The FTC has provided sufficient evidence for the court to believe Vemma to be operating illegal pyramid schemes and participating in false or misleading representation, with the affiliates suffering as a result of these illegal actions.

The Court found that without the aid of a preliminary injunction that Vemma will continue to participate in these illegal actions and granted the FTC an "in part" preliminary injunction over Vemma. The Court prohibited the continuation of certain promotional and marketing program practices (such as paying compensation for the recruitment of new member as well as encouraging incentives for bonuses and sell affiliate packs) as well as appointing a permanent receiver who will oversee the defendants and their assets and affairs through the conclusion of this matter, but did not place a freeze over Vemma's assets in fear that "affiliates" will not be properly compensated. The court ordered for the preservation of all Vemma's records, prohibiting the disclosure of customer information.
