= Fortune Hi-Tech Marketing =

American pyramid scheme which was shut down in 2013

- Type: Private
- Industry: Multi-level marketing, Consumer goods and services
- Founded: January 2001
- Defunct: January 28, 2013
- Fate: Shut down by FTC
- Headquarters: Lexington, Kentucky, United States
- Key people: Paul Orberson (Founder, President); Thomas Mills (CEO)
- Website: fhtm.net at the Wayback Machine (archived 2011-03-04)

Fortune Hi-Tech Marketing (FHTM) was a Lexington, Kentucky based company which used multi-level marketing to sell consumer goods and services. The company was founded in January 2001. In January 2013, the Federal Trade Commission (FTC) and regulators for three states shut down FHTM for being a pyramid scheme.

== Business model ==
Fortune Hi-Tech Marketing used multi-level marketing to recruit representatives to sell a range of retail services and products. Sign up fees ranged from $99 to $299. Representatives were paid a commission on products sold, as well as a bonus for recruiting more representatives. FHTM sold relatively low-profit margin products, and paid a commission of between 0.25% and 1% on products sold, which is extremely low compared to other multi-level marketing companies.

Examples of items sold included mobile-phone services (offered through Simplexity), Dish Network television (as a third party contractor), a line of hair-care products, and others.

In its marketing materials, the company emphasized its ties to well-known brands, such as AT&T, Dish Network, and Sprint, although the company's ties were often through intermediaries, and the companies were not made aware that FHTM was using their names in such a way.

In 2010 FHTM reported that about 95% of representatives made less than $3,100 a year, with 29% making nothing.

== History ==
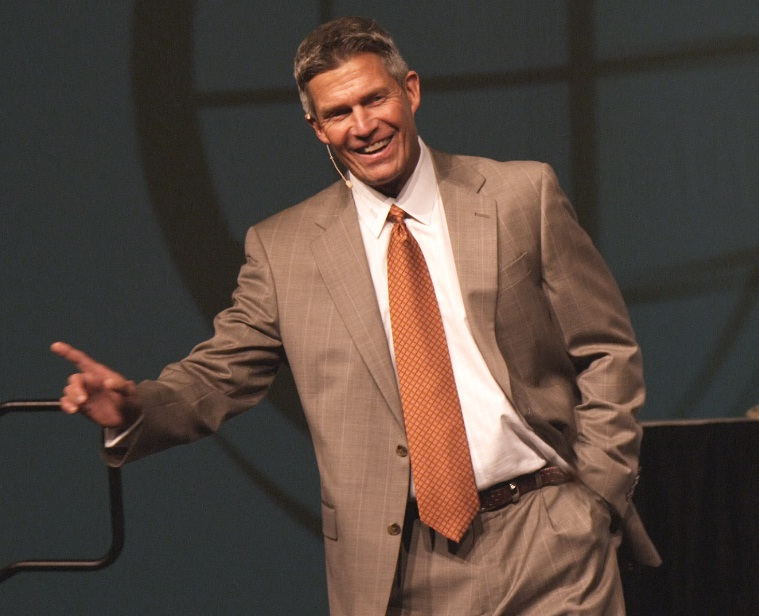
Fortune Hi-Tech Marketing co-founder Paul Orberson

The company was founded in 2001 by Thomas Mills and Paul Orberson, who had both previously worked with Excel Communications. Orberson had also previously worked as a high school basketball coach.

In 2010, the company paid $1 million to settle charges brought by the Montana state securities commission. The charges accused FHTM of acting as an illegal pyramid scheme by primarily compensating affiliates for recruiting other affiliates, rather than for selling products or services. The company did not admit to any wrongdoing, and as part of the agreement, FHTM was required to lower its entry fee within the state from $299 to $75. In response to that and other investigations in other states, FHTM also lowered entry fees outside of Montana to $99. As part of the settlement, FHTM disclosed that 30% of representatives made no money, and 54% of those who did make money made an average of $94 a month before costs.

Following the events in Montana, several other state and federal entities began investigations. In January 2013 the company was sued by the FTC and the Attorneys General of Kentucky, Illinois, and North Carolina. The company's Kentucky offices were raided, and the company was placed in receivership. At that time the company reported having 160,000 independent representatives. The FTC's complaint alleged that the bulk of profit made by affiliates was from recruiting more affiliates, and not from sales, which is a defining trait of pyramid schemes.

Orberson died December 2013 at the age of 56 or 57 from cancer.

In May 2014, the company reached a settlement with the state of Kentucky and the FTC to pay US$7.75 million to former customers, and company officials were banned from future involvement in multi-level marketing, or from selling or benefiting from customer's personal information. Under the settlement, the defendants neither admit nor deny that the company was a pyramid scheme.
