= Kenny Troutt =

American businessman (born 1948)

Kenny A. Troutt
- Born: 1948 (age 77–78); Mount Vernon, Illinois, U.S.
- Occupations: Founder and former CEO, Excel Communications
- Spouse: Lisa E. Copeland
- Children: 3

Notes
- Forbes ranked #1,222th richest person in the world (2014)

Kenny A. Troutt (born 1948) is an American businessman. He founded Excel Communications, a Texas-based telecommunications company that offered long distance phone service. Troutt became a billionaire in 1998 when Excel was sold to Teleglobe for US$3.5 billion. As of March 2025, Forbes estimated his net worth at US$1.7 billion.

Troutt is the sole owner of WinStar Farm, an elite 2,600 acre thoroughbred horse farm in Versailles, Kentucky. He is also the chairman of Mt. Vernon Investments in Dallas, Texas. Troutt won the 13th Triple Crown with Justify, Kentucky Derby twice, Preakness Stakes once, and the Belmont Stakes three times. Some notable stallions from Winstar Farm include Super Saver, winner of the 2010 Kentucky Derby; Drosselmeyer, winner of the 2010 Belmont Stakes; Creator, winner of the 2016 Belmont Stakes; and Justify, winner of the 13th Triple Crown.

Troutt is a major Republican donor and has contributed to American Crossroads, Rick Perry, Rick Santorum, and "Kentuckians for Strong Leadership", a super PAC backing Mitch McConnell. Together with his spouse, Troutt contributed $1.7 million to Donald Trump's 2020 presidential campaign. As of April 19, 2022, Troutt has donated $1,409,651, to Texas Republican candidates Greg Abbott, Ken Paxton, and Dan Patrick. Troutt's son, Preston, has also donated to Republican Party candidates.

Troutt graduated from Southern Illinois University Carbondale in 1971, where he was a member of Tau Kappa Epsilon fraternity.

In 2005, Troutt started the first of three youth basketball teams, known as the Titans, for his sons and the son of a business partner. The teams have an annual budget of $3 million.

== Sources ==
- The Excel Phenomenon by James Robinson, Bantam Doubleday
