= Elite Activity =

Pyramid scheme among churches

Elite Activity is the name used for several pyramid schemes typically targeting Christian churches and their congregations. Elite Activity solicited cash gifts of $100 to start, required participants to sign up two other people, required each of those two to sign up two more, and promised payouts of between $800 and $48,000. Marketing materials emphasized that money paid into the scheme was a gift, using language likened to prosperity gospel teachings.

== Original iteration ==
Harvey Joseph Dockstader, Jr. of Colorado City, Arizona, also known as "H.J." and "Doc," promoted the scheme at the Secret Place International Church in Humble, Texas. In 2006, Dockstader was sentenced to two years in state prison and a $10,000 fine after being convicted of promoting a pyramid scheme. Secret Place International's pastor testified against Dockstader in exchange for a reduced sentence. Dockstader appealed to the 14th Court of Appeals in Texas, which affirmed the decision and concluded that Elite Activity was a pyramid scheme.

As of 2005, the Mississippi Attorney General's office estimated that Elite Activity had involved 22,000 churches around the U.S. and had also included employees of several organizations based in Jackson. A representative noted that multiple states had at that time sued the company in court.

Elite Activity was briefly popular in Asunción; a Paraguayan affiliate used claims that Elite Activity was legal in the U.S. to solicit members in the capital city.

== Later iterations ==
In 2009, while Dockstader was incarcerated, the program continued to operate as "Elite Activity Resurrected." Large numbers of Brazilian immigrants in Greater Boston were participating using marketing materials translated into Portuguese. During this time, Elite Activity claimed to be a church, the Elite Resurrected Church, with Dockstader's attorney as the pastor.

Although two Elite Activity-related web sites had ceased to function in August 2009, the Better Business Bureau serving West and Southwest Georgia and east Alabama warned area residents in March 2010 that it had received a complaint that an Elite Activity recruiter was soliciting funds.
