= Loren Ridinger =

American businesswoman and entrepreneur

- Occupation: Businesswoman
- Known for: Co-founder and CEO of Market America

Loren Ridinger is an American businesswoman and entrepreneur. She is a co-founder and senior executive of Market America, a direct-selling company founded in 1992 by Ridinger, her husband J. R. Ridinger, and her brother Marc Ashley.

== Career ==
Ridinger and J. R. Ridinger founded Market America in Greensboro, North Carolina, in 1992. In 2004, she was the company's senior vice president while her husband served as president and chief executive officer. The company sells products through a network of independent distributors and has operated in several countries.

Ridinger has been involved in Market America's beauty and fashion businesses, including the cosmetics brand Motives by Loren Ridinger and jewelry businesses associated with her name.

In 2025 Ridinger published a memoir, Scrambled or Sunny-Side Up?: Living Your Best Life after Losing Your Greatest Love, with a foreword by Serena Williams. The book debuted on ''The New York Times'' Best Sellers list in the Advice, How-To & Miscellaneous category in March 2025.

In 2026 Ridinger appeared as one of seven cast members in The CEO Club, an eight-episode Amazon Prime Video docuseries executive produced by Williams, which premiered worldwide on February 23, 2026.

== Personal life ==
Ridinger was married to J. R. Ridinger until his death in 2022. She's the mother of Amber Ridinger Mclaughlin.

Ridinger has also been associated with celebrities including Jennifer Lopez, Kim Kardashian and Serena Williams.
