= SeneGence =

American multi-level marketing company

SeneGence International, Inc.
- Type: Private
- Industry: Multi-level marketing
- Founded: 1999; 27 years ago
- Headquarters: Foothill Ranch, CA
- Founder: Joni Rogers-Kante
- Key People: Joni Rogers-Kante (CEO, Chairwoman); Philippe Guerreau (President); Michael Moad (Chief Legal Officer); Ben Kante (Chief Strategy Officer)
- Products: Cosmetics and personal care products
- Areas Served: Worldwide
- Website: web.senegence.com

SeneGence International, Inc. (also known as SGII, Inc.) is a privately owned American multi-level marketing (MLM) company that sells skincare and makeup products, including the LipSense product line. The company was founded in 1999 by Joni Rogers-Kante who is the CEO and chair. The company is headquartered in Foothill Ranch, Lake Forest, California, with facilities in Sapulpa, Oklahoma.

== Business model ==
SeneGence distributors (referred to as "SeneSisters") work under a multi-level marketing system, with titles based on sales numbers and rankings. Income is calculated and derived from product sales, and commissions on wholesale product purchases from recruited distributors. To qualify for earning commissions, distributors are required to spend at least $200 semi-annually (every 6 months) to remain an active distributor. Levels of commissions range between 20%-50% depending on the amount of sales for that given 30 day period

An article in The Outline in December 2017 raised concerns about SeneGence's business model, the payment structures for independent distributors and concerns around 'front-loading' (when distributors buy potentially non-refundable large volumes of inventory either in preparedness for customer orders, or to combat product shortages). According to The Outline, SeneGence's "complicated pay structure" may indicate that the company is close to being an illegal pyramid scheme.

The Daily Beast has said that multi-level marketing distributors, including those with SeneGence, have made extremely aggressive and unsupportable sales claims.

In 2017, there were widespread reports of SeneGence distributors falsely claiming that LipSense had been designated as "the official lipstick of Broadway". According to Racked, the company has emailed distributors asking them not to make this claim, but has not challenged any distributors who ignore this request. Racked found no examples of any SeneGence cosmetics being used by Broadway productions.

== Products ==
SeneGence products started with LipSense lip color, lip gloss, and lip color remover. According to Romper, LipSense products contains polyethylene glycol-related chemicals and parabens suggested as not safe for pregnant and breastfeeding women.

The entire line is cosmetics include lip colour, long-wear cheek products, complexion products (foundation, concealer, tinted moisturizer) and a wide range of cream eyeshadows.

Skincare products with a patented enzyme promoted as Seneplex+ Complex are also available for a number of skin types.

== Marketing ==
Celebrity distributors have included actress Loretta Swit and Teen Mom 2 cast member Leah Messer. Messer received negative feedback on her instagram account regarding her use and promotion of LipSense products on her young daughters.

SeneGence sponsored Lauren Winans, a country musician from Buckhannon, West Virginia. and launched two new shades of LipSense -- 'Luv It' and 'Heartbreaker' -- named after Winans' songs "You're Gonna Luv It". and "Better at Breaking", respectively.

== History ==
According to Rogers-Kante (née Joni Rae Rogers), she established SeneGence after raising funds by selling a chemist's long-wear lip color product, 'Ultralux', which was later rebranded as the SeneGence product line LipSense.

The company was initially based in Newport Beach, California. According to Rogers-Kante, the company earned $1.7 million in revenue from product sales in its first year of operation and $3.8 million the following year. New regional offices were opened in Canada (Burnaby, BC) in November 2001 and Australia (Bundall, Queensland) in early 2003, and the company subsequently expanded to Indonesia, the United Kingdom, and Italy in 2011. In the United Kingdom, the products are sold under the name 'SheerSense'.

As of 2016, the company reported around 50,000 distributors. By 2018 they reported more than 500,000 distributors. The products have been reported as being sold by distributors in between 11 and 13 countries.

In 2016, SeneGence leased a 49,415 square foot property in Foothill Ranch.

In September 2016, SeneGence purchased multiple properties in or near Sapulpa, Oklahoma for a new corporate headquarters, warehouses, and office space. In October 2016 SeneGence broke ground on the new headquarters. The Kante family also purchased adjoining historical properties for further development. The facility was expected to be finished in the second or third quarter of 2018.

As at January 2018, SeneGence employed around 70 people in Sapulpa and Broken Arrow.

== Political involvement ==
In 2010, high-level SeneGence distributor Jeri Taylor-Swade was an active volunteer for the unsuccessful campaign of Republican nominee Sharron Angle. On 21 January 2011, Angle supported SeneGence by being a special guest for a promotional evening alongside Rogers-Kante and Taylor-Swade. Advertising for the event claimed that Angle would show how SeneGence products helped her "look great with 14-16 hour days and with numerous appearances daily" during the campaign.

In March 2017, former Oklahoma state senator Ted Fisher, who was reportedly a long-term adviser to Rogers-Kante, was appointed as the company's Economic Development Officer at the Oklahoma office.

Ben Kante, AKA Bennie Kante, the husband of Joni Kante-Rogers supported President Donald Trump’s inauguration party by donated $250,000.00 to help fund the celebration. In Oklahoma, he is known as having made the largest donor in the state. Many of the distributors supported Mr. Kante’s decision, and this led to inner strife with the consultants being bullied because of their political affiliation. https://www.refinery29.com/en-us/2017/09/170904/lipsense-trump-donations-viral-lipstick
