= Rolf Sorg =

German entrepreneur

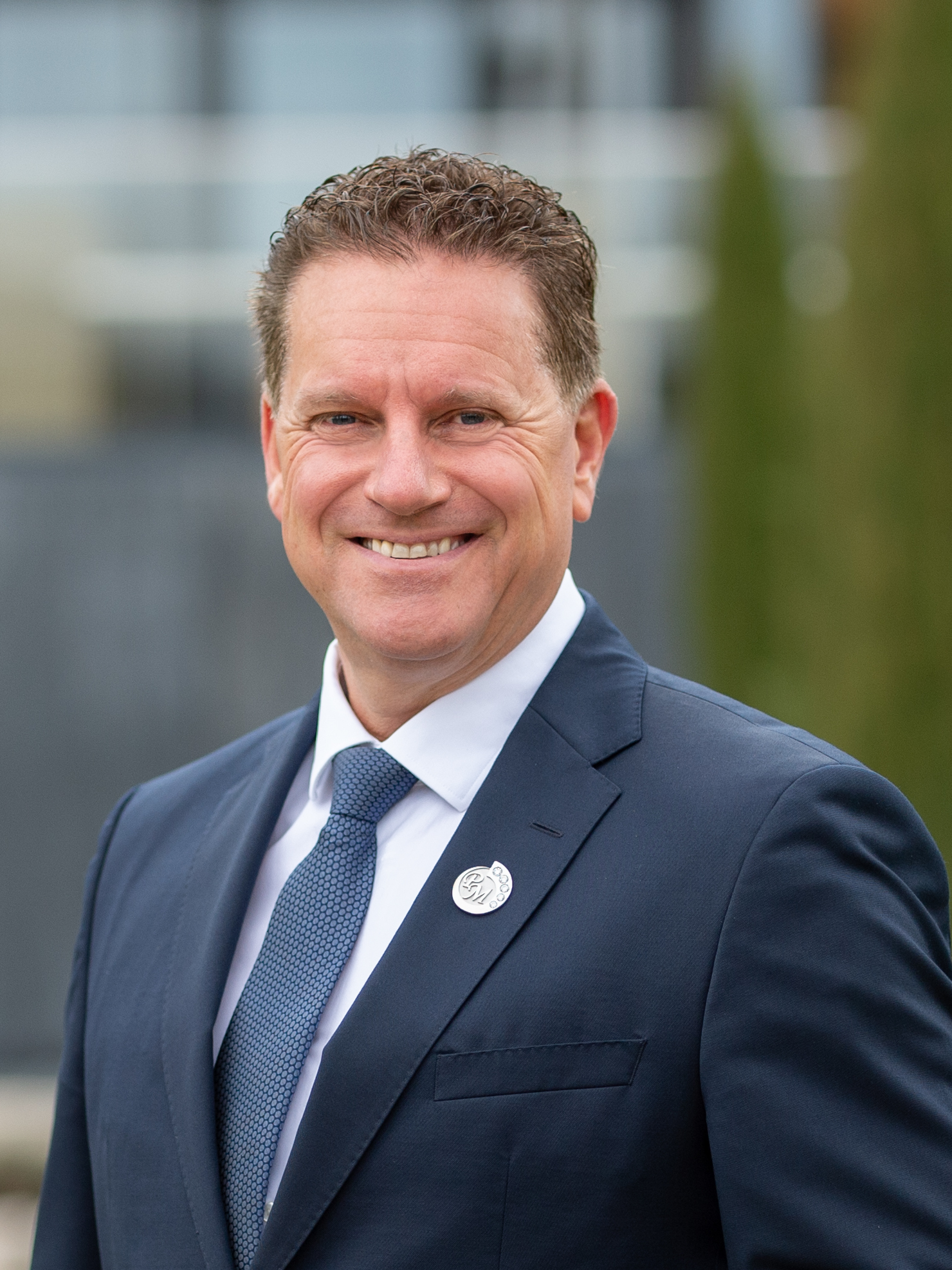
- Entrepreneur, Founder and Chairman
- Occupations: Founder, entrepreneur
- Organization: PM-International AG
- Known for: PM-International
- Notable work: FitLine
- Spouse: Vicki Sorg

Rolf Sorg is an entrepreneur, and the founder and chairman of PM-International AG.

== Career ==
As a student, Sorg started with direct sales of cosmetic products. In 1993, the company he worked for had to file for bankruptcy and Sorg used his savings to found PM-International, followed by the holding company in Luxembourg one year later. In 1995, he expanded the product range to include dietary supplements. Since 2015, the international headquarters of the company is located in Schengen, Luxembourg.

== Awards and recognition ==
- In 2014, Sorg was named one of the Entrepreneurs of the Year by the German publication Manager Magazin.
- In 2023, Rolf Sorg received the Bravo Leadership Award from Direct Selling News. This award honors his leadership throughout PM-International's 30-year history.
- In October 2024, PM-International and Rolf Sorg were officially appointed to the Federal Economic Senate (Bundeswirtschaftssenat – BWS) in Germany.
- In 2025, his company was ranked 6th in the Direct Selling News Global 100 list.

== Personal life ==
He is married to Vicki Sorg, who is also active in the company as a charity ambassador. Sorg is father of two children.

In 2013, Sorg sued Google for violation of his personal rights by adding search queries. He won the case before the German Federal Court of Justice. Sorg has lived in Luxembourg since 1998 and has the Luxembourg citizenship.
