= Jowell Global =

Holding company (founded 2012

Jowell Global Ltd.
- Type: Public
- Traded as: Nasdaq: JWEL
- Industry: E-commerce; Biotechnology; Manufacturing
- Founded: 2012 (14 years ago)
- Founder: Xu Zhiwei
- Headquarters: Shanghai, China
- Key people: Xu Zhiwei (chairman & CEO); Dan Zhao (director & vice president)
- Revenue: ▲US$96.88 million (2020)
- Operating income: ▲US$5.11 million (2020)
- Net income: ▲US$3.59 million (2020)
- Total assets: ▲US$33.86 million (2020)
- Total equity: ▲US$18.74 million (2020)
- Subsidiaries: Longrich; Juhao Mall
- Website: 1juhao.com

Jowell Global Ltd. is a Chinese holding company which owns its predecessor Longrich and operates Juhao Mall, an e-commerce platform for cosmetics, health and nutritional supplements and household products.

Juhao started operations in 2012 as one of the first membership-based online-to-offline e-commerce platforms in China. Juhao provides products to customers, sells and distributes other companies products on its platform. Juhao allows third parties to open stores through its platform for a service fee based on sale revenues generated from their online stores. Market based information is also provided to support sales. Juhao also sells its products through authorized retail stores all across China. Besides online direct sales, authorized retail store distribution and third-party merchants, Juhao also operates the live streaming marketing sales channel.

In 2021, Jowell Global became a public company listed on NASDAQ after launching an IPO and partnered with Hope Bio-Technology Co. Ltd to develop new Cell-Tech based skincare products, cosmetics, health and nutrition supplements. Jowell Global also made an agreement with ZTO Express to provide logistics services for goods sent to Africa and to the rest of the world .
