= Pure Romance =

American Sexual Health and Wellness Company

- Company type: Private
- Industry: Retail
- Founded: 1993
- Founders: Patty Brisben
- Headquarters: Cincinnati, Ohio, United States
- Area served: North America, Puerto Rico, Australia, and New Zealand
- Key people: Chris Cicchinelli (President and CEO)
- Products: Adult products and sex toys, bath and body products, lubricants, and bondage
- Number of employees: 170 (2018)
- Website: pureromance.com

Pure Romance is an American company that manufactures and sells sex toys, sexual wellness, and cosmetic products.

Formerly a multi-level marketing company, in May 2023, Pure Romance announced it was moving away from the MLM model to become a 100% direct-to-consumer business.

== History ==
Patty Brisben, a former pediatrician's assistant, founded the company, then named Slumber Parties in Loveland, Ohio 1993. Her business used contract salespeople to sell sex toys, lotions, and massage oils through at-home parties. In 2000, the company had six full-time employees and had annual sales of less than $2 million.

Brisben's son, Chris Cicchinelli, joined the company in 2000 and encouraged his mother to expand beyond local sales into markets such as St. Louis, Missouri. By 2003 the company had $30 million in sales, 3,500 consultants, and was active in 46 US states and the US Virgin Islands. The company was renamed Pure Romance in 2003.

In 2011, the Pure Romance expanded into South Africa and Australia. In 2012, Cicchinelli took over the position of President and CEO while Brisben stayed on as chair of the company. At this time the company reported to have $100 million in annual sales and 75,000 consultants, building on the popularity of the recently published erotic romance novel 50 Shades of Grey.

In February 2014, the company moved its headquarters to downtown Cincinnati, Ohio.

In 2014 Pure Romance purchased a separate MLM which was also named Slumber Parties, based in Baton Rouge, Louisiana, which sold similar products. In 2016 the company purchased Passion Parties, yet another multi-level marketing company with a similar product line, expanding the company into the Canadian market.

In January 2016, Pure Romance, among other MLMs, entered into an agreement with the State of Hawaii’s Department of Taxation to obtain a single general excise license and become the represented tax collection agent on behalf of its direct sellers.

The company reported $217.92 million in sales in 2017 and claimed to have more than 30,000 consultants. In 2018, it reported $237 million in sales.

== Criticism ==
The MLM model has been criticized since the overwhelming majority of participants (most sources estimated to be over 99.25% of all MLM distributors) participate at either an insignificant or nil net profit. Indeed, the largest proportion of participants must operate at a net loss (after expenses are deducted) so that the few individuals in the uppermost level of the MLM pyramid can derive their significant earnings. Said earnings are then emphasized by the MLM company to all other participants to encourage their continued participation at a continuing financial loss.

In particular, Pure Romance has been criticized for targeting military spouses in the United States, who often have trouble finding traditional employment, since they have to move frequently for their spouses' careers.

== See also ==
- List of multi-level marketing companies
