= BioPerformance =

American multi-level marketing company

- Industry: Multi-level marketing
- Founded: 2006
- Headquarters: Irving, Texas

BioPerformance is a multi-level marketing company that sells fuel additives, often in the form of "gas pills", which are claimed to increase fuel efficiency in automobiles. The company was founded in 2005 by Gus Romero.

Research has concluded that the "gas pills" are not effective with regard to fuel efficiency. It has also been claimed that BioPerformance made other false claims, such as that its pills are non-toxic (they are made primarily of naphthalene, a toxic chemical also found in mothballs). The company was sued and temporarily shut down on May 17, 2006 by the Texas Attorney General for being an alleged pyramid scheme and also because of the company's alleged false advertising claims.

It has been asserted by former BioPerformance representatives now speaking out against BioPerformance that the company appears to have taken early precautionary measures to avoid refunds on the gas pill. The company accepted money order payments or check payments through postal mail. Multilevel marketing companies selling faulty products have been known to not accept credit card payments due to charge backs from unsatisfied customers, which in turn create accrued charge back fees for the company.

As of May 2007, the company still does not take credit cards and is still selling a naphthalene-based product. The headquarters is no longer in Texas, and the company no longer ships to Texas, where the owners were sued and ultimately gave over $7,000,000 to the Office of the Attorney General. Nor did they issue refunds or ship over 10,000 cases of product, although complaints arrived from all over the nation. To date, over $6.5 million in refund requests have been processed by the Texas Attorney General's Office.
