= Casey Serin =

Real estate investor and influencer associated with the 2008 mortgage crisis

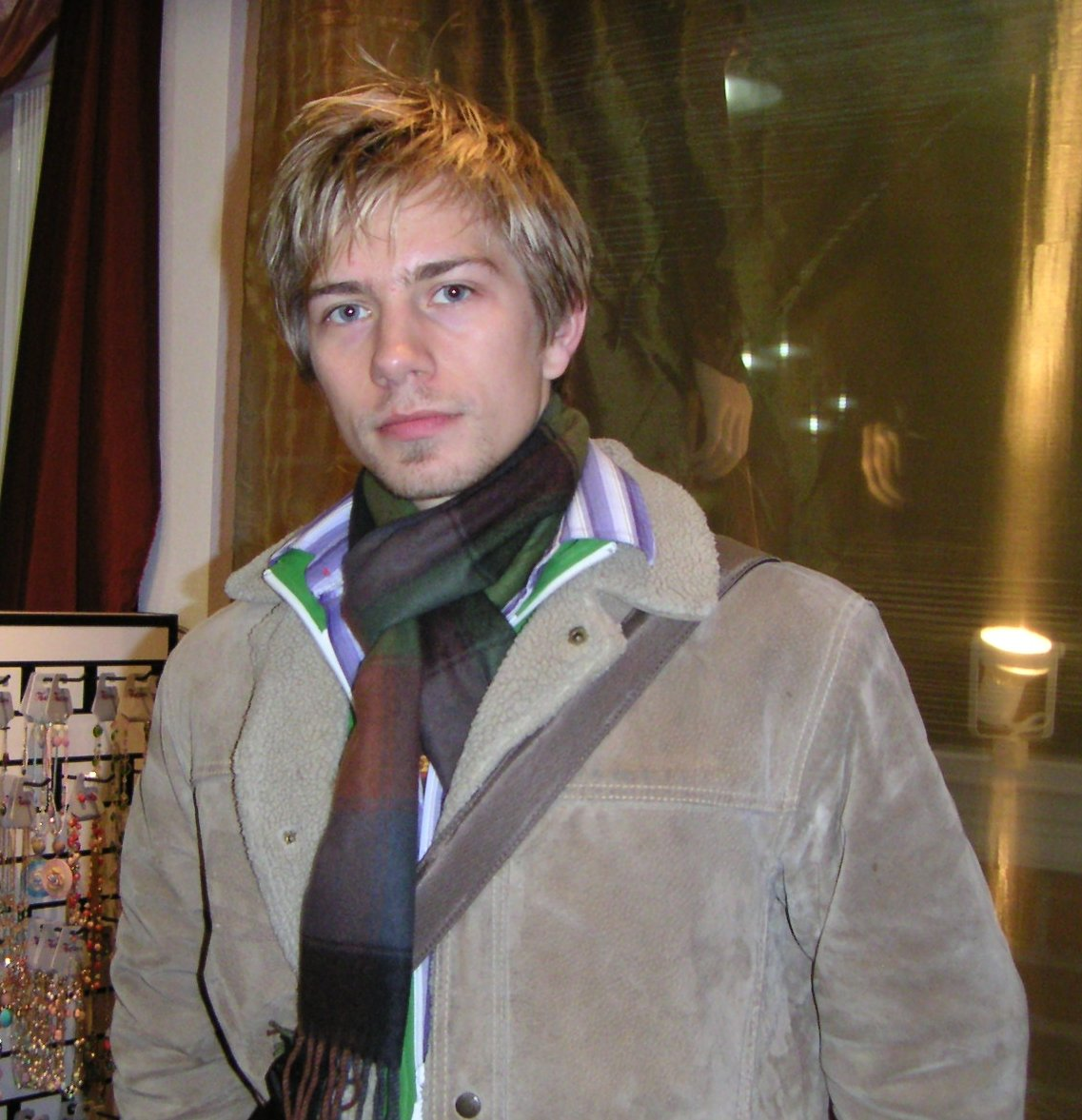
- Serin in 2007
- Born: September 10, 1982 (age 44); Tashkent, Uzbek SSR, Soviet Union
- Occupation: Real estate investor
- Known for: Real estate speculation, blogging

Casey Konstantin Serin (Uzbek: Кейси Константин Серин) (born September 10, 1982, legally renamed Casey Constantine in April 2016) is an Uzbekistan-born American blogger, mortgage broker, and real estate investor. In a newspaper article, USA Today called him the "poster child for everything that went wrong in the real estate boom". Born in Tashkent, Uzbekistan, Serin immigrated to the United States in 1994. After graduating from high school, Serin bounced from job to job, generally working in website design. However, in his early twenties, Serin decided to quit working full-time in order to pursue a career in house flipping as a means of earning an income and building wealth. In an eight-month period beginning in October 2005, Serin purchased eight houses in four southwest U.S. states, and then began blogging about the foreclosure process on the properties he was unable to resell. In time, five of the eight properties foreclosed. The dubious nature of Serin's real estate transactions, coupled with his subsequent blogging about the affair, have led to Serin's name becoming strongly associated with the subprime mortgage crisis.

== Background ==
Between October 2005 and May 2006, Serin purchased eight single-family homes using stated income loans. These loans required no documentation of income, nor any down payments. Before quitting his web design position in January 2006, Serin claimed an over-inflated income (roughly five times his actual pay) on his loan applications, reasoning that many other borrowers were using similar strategies to obtain mortgages for which they would not otherwise qualify. He continued to claim the same income on loan applications completed after he had quit his job. Serin stated that several of the properties were purchased with owner-occupied loans; these generally provide more favorable terms than loans for investment properties. A Voice of San Diego article suggests that Serin's initial loans may not have appeared in credit reports pulled for subsequent loans because he purchased properties in several states over a relatively brief period, so that "the banks couldn't trace the pending loan documents to check up on his story."

Serin received cash back at closing on six of the properties, sometimes exceeding California's legal maximum of three percent of the selling price. A contributor to the Scotsman Guide, a trade publication for the mortgage industry, stated in an article discussing fraudulent practices within the mortgage industry, that the largest amount of cash Serin received for a transaction was $50,000, and that the money was paid either to the seller or a third-party company (which the contributor alleges was bogus), and then returned to Serin after closing. The author, CEO and senior legal counsel of Investors Mortgage Asset Recovery Co. LLC, concludes that responsibility for fraud in cases such as Serin's lies with "everyone who knew about the undisclosed cash and knowingly assisted in the scheme, including the sellers and any real estate agents, appraisers or closing agents." Serin disclosed on a Sacramento news program that he likely would not have been able to qualify for loans under more traditional terms.

Despite already being deeply in debt, in late 2006, Serin borrowed $16,000 to purchase a week-long real estate seminar course purporting to teach "creative financing" at Nouveau Riche University (NRU) in Phoenix. Jim Piccolo, the founder of NRU, was later fined a record $6 million in 2011 by the Arizona Corporation Commission for running a fraudulent real estate investment scheme.

Months later, as the United States housing bubble began to rapidly deflate, Serin became unable to pay the mortgages or sell the properties; at one point, he estimated that he was approximately $2.2 million in debt, with a net worth around negative $600,000. Serin's house buying spree ultimately ended when a lender rejected a loan application for what would have been his ninth property, after discovering his blog. Because of the sheer magnitude of Serin's debt and the improbability of his story, some observers had initially questioned its veracity, alleging that the blog was either performance art or a viral marketing campaign. An article at The Motley Fool expressed doubt over "whether or not this [isn't] just a somewhat elaborate hoax.". However, public records confirm that Serin did purchase the properties in question and did subsequently default on most of the mortgages.

== Foreclosure blog and media attention ==
In September 2006, Serin started the blog IamFacingForeclosure describing his situation, with the idea of both soliciting advise and warning others how to avoid the mistakes he had made. Interest in the blog first developed among readers of other blogs devoted to the United States housing bubble. His story was featured in numerous media outlets—among them, USA Today, National Public Radio, New York magazine, the San Francisco Chronicle, The Economist, The Suze Orman Show, and ABC's Nightline. When Serin first started the blog, commenters were generally supportive, hoping that Serin would make a good faith effort to avoid foreclosure and pay back any remaining debts by looking for work. The initial media exposure largely lauded Serin as an example of forthright blogging, without delving very deeply into the origin of his debts. Also, in 2006 Casey Serin appeared on "Rich Dad's Online Business School" where Casey Serin told his story to Robert Kiyosaki and the members of his audience.

During the ensuing nine months that the blog was updated, Serin generally let his problems stagnate—urgent mail went unopened, the houses went into foreclosure one by one, and Serin did not actively look for work. The overall tone of the blog's comments gradually went from encouraging Serin to openly deriding him for his inaction, his apparent nonchalant attitude towards his financial issues, and his role in the then-emerging subprime mortgage crisis. In May 2007, CNET.com writer Declan McCullagh published an article about Serin's story and the largely negative reactions Serin's blog was garnering from commenters, referring to Serin as "the world's most hated blogger" and describing his blog as "irritainment." McCullagh wrote that "Casey's blog has an enthusiastic – if unrelentingly critical – audience known as 'haterz'." Serin acknowledged that he began to purposely anger readers in an effort to drive further traffic to the blog.

=== Fate of the blog ===
In April 2007, Serin appeared on The Suze Orman Show to discuss his financial predicament. Orman recommended that Serin file for bankruptcy and attempt to increase his take-home pay.

The final months of his blog saw further erratic behavior by Serin, including a June 2007 spur-of-the-moment flight to Australia without informing his wife or family members. Regarding his multiple mortgages, Serin acknowledged to the Sydney Morning Herald that "the stuff I did is technically mortgage fraud, but it's not officially called that until someone prosecutes me and proves that that is indeed mortgage fraud," asserting a presumption of innocence. While in Australia, Casey Serin appeared on Top Shelf Radio with Robbie Buck. On the Jon Ronson show, Serin again confirmed his use of so-called "liar loans".

On July 11, 2007, Serin disclosed that he was under investigation by the FBI. In an interview conducted by ABC News, his attorney reported that Casey Serin was under investigation by the FBI, but that "no charges have been brought against Mr. Serin. However, based upon conversations with the U.S. Attorney's office in California, federal charges related to Mr. Serin's real estate transactions are expected to be brought against him". Shortly thereafter, Serin said in a mass e-mailing that he would be closing the blog and getting a "regular W-2 job," citing the stress his family has experienced.

== Return to real estate ==
In 2016, Serin legally changed his name to Casey Constantine. In Facebook comments, he stated that the name change is a sort of rebranding for the next chapter of his career/business in real estate, and that it will allow him much more control over his search results online, somewhat of a clean slate. After the name change, Casey became a licensed Real Estate Broker and Mortgage Loan Originator. He has resumed investing.
