= Scentsy =

American multi-level marketing company

- Company type: Private
- Industry: multi-level marketing
- Founded: 2003 (relaunched 2004)
- Founders: Kara Egan; Colette Gunnell
- Headquarters: Meridian, Idaho, U.S.
- Area served: North America, Europe, Australia and New Zealand
- Key people: Heidi & Orville Thompson (CEO), Dan Orchard (interim CEO)
- Products: Scented products
- Number of employees: 1,056 (2018)
- Website: scentsy.com

Scentsy is an American multi-level marketing company based in Meridian, Idaho, that sells scented products including wax warmers and other home and body products.

The company was founded by Kara Egan and Colette Gunnell in 2003, and was relaunched by new owners in 2004.

== History ==
Scentsy was founded by Kara Egan and her sister-in-law Colette Gunnell in Salt Lake City, Utah, in 2003. At a small business event in 2004, they met Orville Thompson, a struggling entrepreneur who had previously started several unprofitable business ventures. Thompson took an interest in the pair's wick-less candle company and a few months later, he and his wife Heidi Thompson purchased the company from Egan and Gunnell. The Thompsons moved the company's headquarters to Meridian, Idaho, and on July 1, 2004, they relaunched Scentsy using a multi-level marketing distribution model.

Marketing materials for Scentsy were created by a Layton, Utah-based graphic design company, ScentsySuccess (an authorized division of Ann Dalton Design Inc.). ScentsySuccess was acquired by Scentsy in 2008, at which time they moved to a new distribution center and showroom in Layton.

In 2009, the company expanded into Canada and in 2011, it expanded again, into the United Kingdom and Germany. In 2012, the company had over 170,000 active independent consultants. At the end of 2015, this number had fallen to 95,891. Co-founder Kara Egan remained with the company as a consultant and had over 42,000 down line consultants as of 2012.

In 2017, the company reported over $450 million in annual sales, putting it as number 44 on Direct Selling News' list of the top direct selling companies in the world. It was also on the Forbes magazine 2011 list of America's 100 Most Promising Companies and the 2018 list of America’s Best Midsize Employers.

In 2021, Scentsy opened an east coast distribution center in Rock Hill, South Carolina. That same year, Dan Orchard became the interim CEO while Heidi and Orville Thompson moved to London to serve as a mission president couple for the Church of Jesus Christ of Latter-Day Saints. Orchard previously served as the general manager of emerging markets. The Thompson's returned to their CEO duties at the end of their mission service in 2024.

In 2023, Disney announced they would partner with Scentsy to create "Smellephants on Parade", a Dumbo-themed activity with smellable attractions.

== Business model ==
Under the multi-level marketing (MLM) model used by Scentsy, all products are sold exclusively through independent consultants, with no retail sales. Consultants can also receive a portion of the sales of any new consultants that they recruit. In a 2011 interview, CEO Orville Thompson said that they chose a direct selling model because their wickless candles were "an experiential product" that were best showcased in home-based parties and that MLM distributing allowed them to offer a larger selection of products than was possible to offer in the limited space of a retail store.

Scentsy has been criticized for its heavy recruitment of American military spouses, whose families' frequent moves mean they often have trouble finding consistent employment.

According to its 2015 income disclosure statement, about 66,000 or 65% of active Scentsy consultants receive an average of $463.34 per year, before expenses. The top 200 or about 0.2% of consultants, earned an average of $113,363.98, with the highest income earner making nearly $1 million. According to a military.com article, it takes most consultants over four years to earn a yearly income equivalent to working three and a half hours per week at minimum wage, not counting business expenses. The blog Bottlesoup calculates that a consultant will have to sell 639 Scentsy products per month to earn the equivalent of a full-time, minimum-wage job. An analysis by The Finance Guy blog, claims that 99.45% of Scentsy consultants were not able to earn a full-time income.

Scentsy was profiled in a study about the rhetoric used by companies in the direct selling industry. Scentsy's recruitment material was noted to emphasize personal agency within the context of Bormann's fantasy theme analysis and convergence theory.

== See also ==
- List of multi-level marketing companies
