= BurnLounge =

American multi-level marketing company

- Type: Private
- Industry: multi-level marketing
- Products: music files
- Website: www.burnlounge.com

BurnLounge, Inc. was a multi-level marketing online music store founded in 2004 and based in New York City. By 2006, the company reported 30,000 members using the site to sell music through its network. In 2007, the company was sued by the Federal Trade Commission for being an illegal pyramid scheme. The company lost the suit in 2012, and lost appeal in June 2014. In June 2015, the FTC began returning $1.9 million to people who had lost money in the scheme. The company is dormant pending additional appeals.

== Business model ==
BurnLounge was founded in 2004, with offices in New York City. Its primary business was the BurnLounge online music store, and it was associated with Orbital Publishing, which produced printed matter for the company. Former CEO Alex Arnold (formerly with Excel Communications and founder and former chairman of NuEWorld.com).

Described by Gartner G2 as a multi-level marketing company, BurnLounge used the term "concentric retail" to describe its business model.

The company's site allowed customers to preview and purchase music, and chat through a proprietary client. Customers wishing to sell music through their own custom pages were required to purchase a subscription. Subscription costs varied, and consisted of either an annual fee or an annual fee with an additional monthly charge. These fees only allowed one to redeem sales points for BurnLounge products; participants paid additional fees if they wished to exchange earned sales points for money. A Fortune article places the commission at five cents per 99-cent download.

In 2006 the company stated that nearly 30,000 people had opened BurnLounge storefronts, including several major label musicians. The service provided content supplied by Muze, with early versions of its software provided by Beatport and SocialIM. Version 0.9 of the software was introduced in October 2005, and version 1.0 was unveiled in Las Vegas on June 9 and 10, 2006. BurnLounge offered only music downloads, but other products such as audiobooks, video, ring tones, and physical merchandise were said to be planned. Burnlounge 2.0 (or BL2) launched quietly on Friday, April 27, 2007.

== FTC pyramid scheme lawsuit ==
Federal Trade Commission (FTC) filed a lawsuit on June 5, 2007, against specific BurnLounge participants for involvement in a pyramid scheme. The FTC claimed that BurnLounge is a pyramid scheme because the company pays more money for recruiting new store owners than for selling music. The lawsuit claimed that BurnLounge made very little money from the sale of music, and made the vast majority of its money from independent associates (named "moguls") paying between $29.95 and $429.95 a year plus fees, for the right to sell music. The lawsuit also stated that associates were paid a cash reward for recruiting others into the program.

One person named in the lawsuit, Rob DeBoer, says that he recruited about 45 other people to open their own BurnLounge sites. Those recruited would then pay a commission on their sales to DeBoer. DeBoer stated that he made almost US$300,000 from BurnLounge. The lawsuit is the result of a year-long investigation into BurnLounge by the state of South Carolina. Others named in the lawsuit include former BurnLounge CEO Alex Arnold, and two Texas men who promoted BurnLounge similarly to DeBoer. The case went before a federal judge in December 2008, and while many of the accusations against the company were dropped by the FTC, on February 29, 2012, an order was issued barring the defendants from operating a pyramid scheme and ordering them to pay some $17 million in damages.

=== Court ruling ===
In June 2014, the U.S. Court of Appeals unanimously upheld the ruling, declaring BurnLounge to be an illegal pyramid scheme. BurnLounge was considering appeal to the Supreme Court. Multi-level marketing analysts describe the ruling as being likely significant to an FTC investigation of Herbalife. Herbalife praised the ruling, saying that it clarified that its own business model does not fall under the appellate court's definition of pyramid scheme.

==== Redress ====
In June 2015, the FTC began mailing checks to consumers who had lost money in the pyramid scheme. The FTC was mailing 52,099 checks totaling almost $1.9 million. The company is dormant pending additional appeals. As of April 2019, the company's website hosted a teaser promoting BurnLounge 3.0 with the statement, "Get ready", which remained unchanged for over ten years.
