= Truth in Advertising (organization) =

American advertising watchdog organization

- Formation: 2012; 14 years ago
- Legal status: 501(c)(3) nonprofit
- Purpose: Consumer advocacy
- Location: Madison, Connecticut
- Website: www.truthinadvertising.org

TINA.org (TruthinAdvertising.org) is an independent, non-profit, advertising watchdog organization founded in the United States of America. TINA.org was founded in 2012 and received its initial funding from Karen Pritzker and Michael Vlock through their Seedlings Foundation, which supports programs that nourish the physical and mental health of children and families, and fosters an educated and engaged citizenship. TINA.org is headed by Bonnie Patten, who has served as its Executive Director since its founding.

== Legal efforts and investigative journalism ==
On March 28, 2013, TINA.org took action against NourishLife, LLC after finding that the company was using a number of deceptive marketing tactics to sell a potentially harmful supplement for children with speech delays. The organization sent legal complaint letters to the company’s CEO as well as to the Federal Trade Commission (FTC), the Food and Drug Administration, and the Illinois Attorney General, urging each of them to take action. On August 14, 2013, the National Advertising Division of the Better Business Bureau recommended that the company discontinue and amend certain claims used to market the product. The company has since corrected its website and has begun amending its product packaging.

TINA.org’s investigation and criticism of Vemma, which makes the energy drink Verve and enlists students ostensibly to sell its products, has been cited and quoted in New York Post articles that raised questions about whether Vemma is running a legitimate multi-level marketing business or an illegal pyramid scheme. A subsequent class-action lawsuit against Vemma cited TINA.org's reporting of numerous complaints about Vemma that have been submitted to the FTC.

In 2017, Truth in Advertising investigated Goop and accused the company of making deceptive health claims about the products they sell.

On May 5, 2019, Truth in Advertising filed a complaint with the FTC regarding Williams-Sonoma, Inc.’s continued use of false Made in the USA marketing. In March 2020, the FTC announced a settlement with Williams-Sonoma. The company has agreed to stop making false, misleading, or unsubstantiated ‘Made in the USA’ claims and is required to pay $1 million to the FTC.

On November 12, 2019, Truth in Advertising filed complaints against Neurocore, a "brain training” company backed by Education Secretary Betsy DeVos. TINA's two complaints were with the Food and Drug Administration for unapproved medical devices and the Federal Trade Commission for deceptive marketing.
