= Free Fees Initiative =

Irish undergraduate tuition-fee policy

The Free Fees Initiative is an Irish higher education funding policy under which the State pays tuition fees for eligible full-time undergraduate students attending approved courses in eligible institutions in the Republic of Ireland. The policy applies mainly to first-time undergraduate students who meet nationality, residence, course and previous-study conditions.

The initiative does not remove all student charges. Students who qualify for free tuition fees are normally still liable for the annual student contribution charge, which is separate from tuition fees. For the 2025/26 academic year, the student contribution charge for students eligible under the Free Fees Initiative was €2,500 per year. Students may apply to Student Universal Support Ireland (SUSI) for a grant towards the student contribution charge or, where they do not qualify for the Free Fees Initiative, towards tuition fees.

== History ==
The Free Fees Initiative was introduced in the mid-1990s by the Irish Government as a policy to abolish undergraduate tuition fees for eligible students. The then Minister for Education, Niamh Bhreathnach, announced details in February 1995 of the phasing out of eligible third-level undergraduate fees. The policy was phased in over two academic years: tuition fees were halved for new entrants in 1995/96 and removed from 1996/97 onwards.

The Higher Education Authority reported that increased exchequer provision to HEA-funded universities and designated institutions in 1997 was largely attributable to the roll-forward of the Free Fees Initiative into later years of academic programmes. The abolition of fees formed part of a wider period of expansion in Irish higher education during the 1990s, including increased student participation and policy attention to access for under-represented groups.

== Eligibility ==
Eligibility is assessed by the higher education institution attended by the student, not directly by the Higher Education Authority. The initiative applies to eligible students attending full-time undergraduate courses in eligible institutions. Courses must generally be at least two years in duration and must be approved courses in institutions covered by the scheme.

For Level 8 undergraduate courses, the Higher Education Authority states that tuition fees may be paid for full-time students who have been ordinarily resident in an EU, EEA or Swiss state, or in the United Kingdom, for at least three of the five years before entry to the course, and who meet the nationality and other conditions of the scheme. Eligible students may include Irish, EU, EEA, Swiss and UK nationals, as well as some students with qualifying immigration or protection statuses, depending on the detailed criteria applied by institutions.

Tuition fees are not normally paid under the initiative for students pursuing a second undergraduate course or for students who already hold a postgraduate qualification. Students who already hold a Level 6 or Level 7 qualification may, however, be eligible where they are progressing to a Level 8 honours degree and meet the other conditions of the initiative.

Students repeating a year at the same level are generally not covered, although the condition may be waived in exceptional circumstances, such as certified serious illness. Students who previously started but did not complete a third-level course may have eligibility reduced for the equivalent period of study where their earlier course received exchequer support. Students returning after a break of at least five years may be eligible in some circumstances.

== Eligible institutions ==
The Free Fees Initiative applies to approved courses in eligible higher education institutions. These include universities, technological universities, institutes of technology and other publicly funded or recognised higher education institutions listed by the Higher Education Authority. Institutions assess whether an individual student satisfies the criteria for the initiative.

== Student contribution charge ==
Although the initiative pays eligible tuition fees, it does not cover the student contribution charge. The student contribution covers registration, examination, student services and part of the cost of tuition. The Student Grant Scheme 2026 defines the student contribution as the charge payable by students deemed eligible for free tuition fees under the Free Fees Schemes.

The student contribution charge has been a major part of debate on the cost of higher education in Ireland. The Government made temporary reductions to the charge during the early 2020s and announced in Budget 2026 a permanent €500 reduction, reducing the standard charge from €3,000 to €2,500. The Department of Further and Higher Education, Research, Innovation and Science described the Budget 2026 measure as the first permanent cut to the student contribution fee since the introduction of free fees in 1995.

Students who qualify for a SUSI fee grant may have all or part of the student contribution charge paid on their behalf. The Student Grant Scheme 2026 provides for full, 50% or €500 grants towards the student contribution charge for eligible students who qualify for free tuition fees under the Free Fees Schemes.

== Relationship with student grants ==
The Free Fees Initiative is separate from the Student Grant Scheme. The initiative pays tuition fees for eligible students, while the Student Grant Scheme provides means-tested maintenance grants and fee grants. Fee grants can pay tuition fees for students who do not qualify for the Free Fees Initiative and may also cover the student contribution charge or compulsory field-trip costs.

Under the Student Grant Scheme, a student who qualifies for free tuition fees under the Free Fees Schemes is not eligible for the tuition-fee element of a fee grant, because the tuition-fee element is already covered by the State through the Free Fees Initiative. Such students may instead be assessed for support towards the student contribution charge.

== Policy debate and analysis ==
The Free Fees Initiative has been debated in Ireland as both an access measure and a higher education funding policy. Supporters have argued that the abolition of undergraduate tuition fees expanded access to higher education and normalised college participation for a wider part of Irish society. Critics have argued that the removal of tuition fees was not sufficiently targeted at low-income students and that social-class differences in access to higher education remained strongly shaped by earlier educational attainment.

A 2011 study by economist Kevin Denny examined the effect of abolishing university tuition costs in Ireland on the socio-economic gradient in university participation. The study concluded that the reform did not clearly achieve its objective of improving educational equality, and argued that differences in second-level educational performance were central to explaining differences in progression to university. Other commentary has also described the Irish experience as a cautionary example in free-tuition policy because tuition fees were removed but other student charges later increased.

The Government's Funding the Future process has continued to consider the relationship between tuition supports, student grants and the overall cost of higher education. The Department of Further and Higher Education, Research, Innovation and Science stated in 2025 that financial supports such as the Free Fees Scheme and SUSI grants are critical to supporting learners, while also noting that schemes must evolve to reflect costs of living and changing patterns of learning.

== See also ==
- Student financial aid
- Third-level education in the Republic of Ireland
- Higher education in the Republic of Ireland
- Higher Education Authority
- Tuition fees
- Graduate tax
- Widening participation
