= PM-International =

Luxembourg manufacturer

PM-International AG
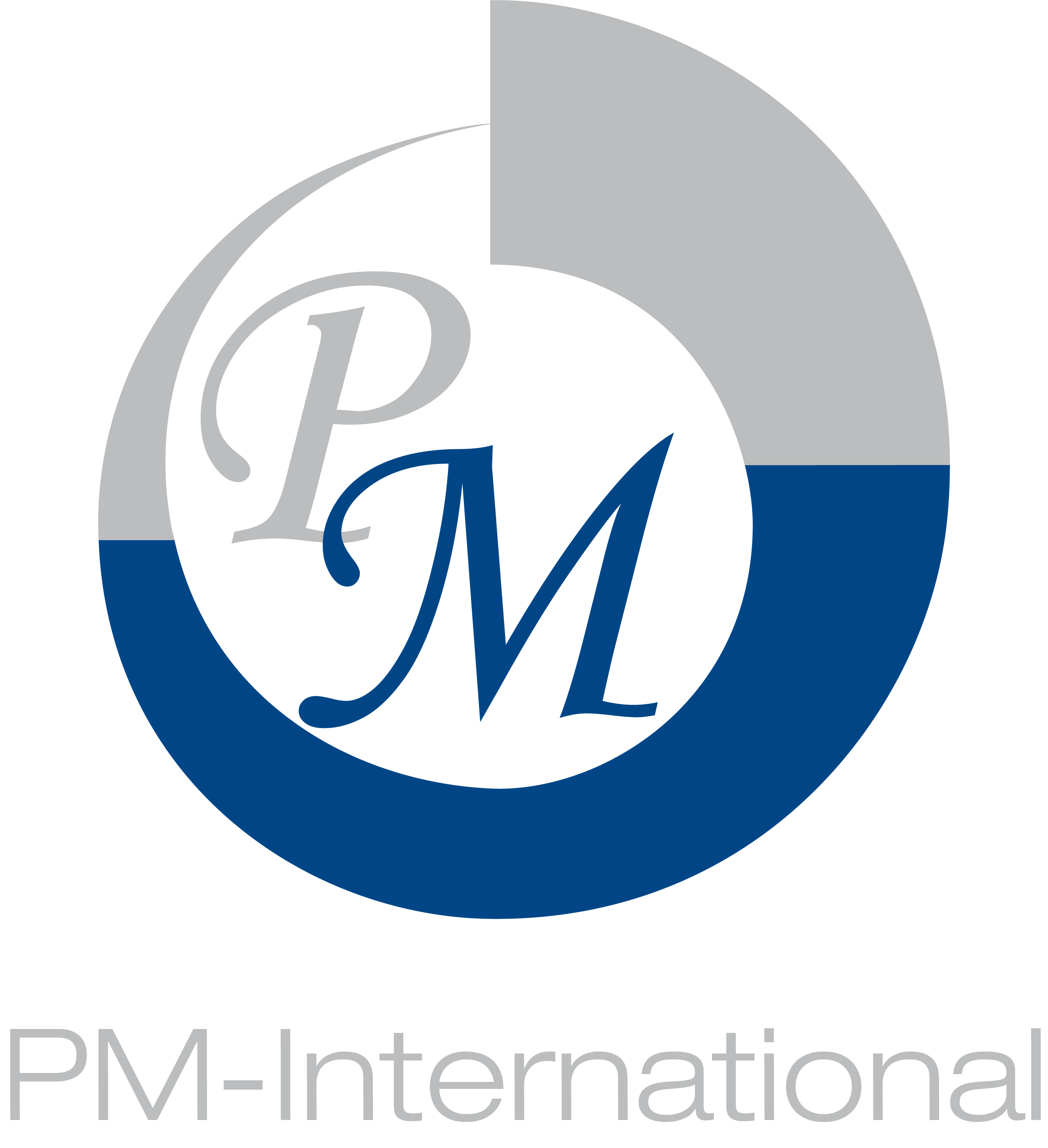
- Company type: Unlisted Stock Corporation
- Industry: Direct Selling
- Founded: 1993 in Limburgerhof
- Founder: Rolf Sorg
- Headquarters: Schengen, Luxembourg
- Area served: worldwide
- Products: Cosmetics, Dietary Supplements
- Revenue: $ 3.25 billion (2024)
- Owner: Rolf Sorg
- Number of employees: 1,000 (2024)
- Website: www.pm-international.com

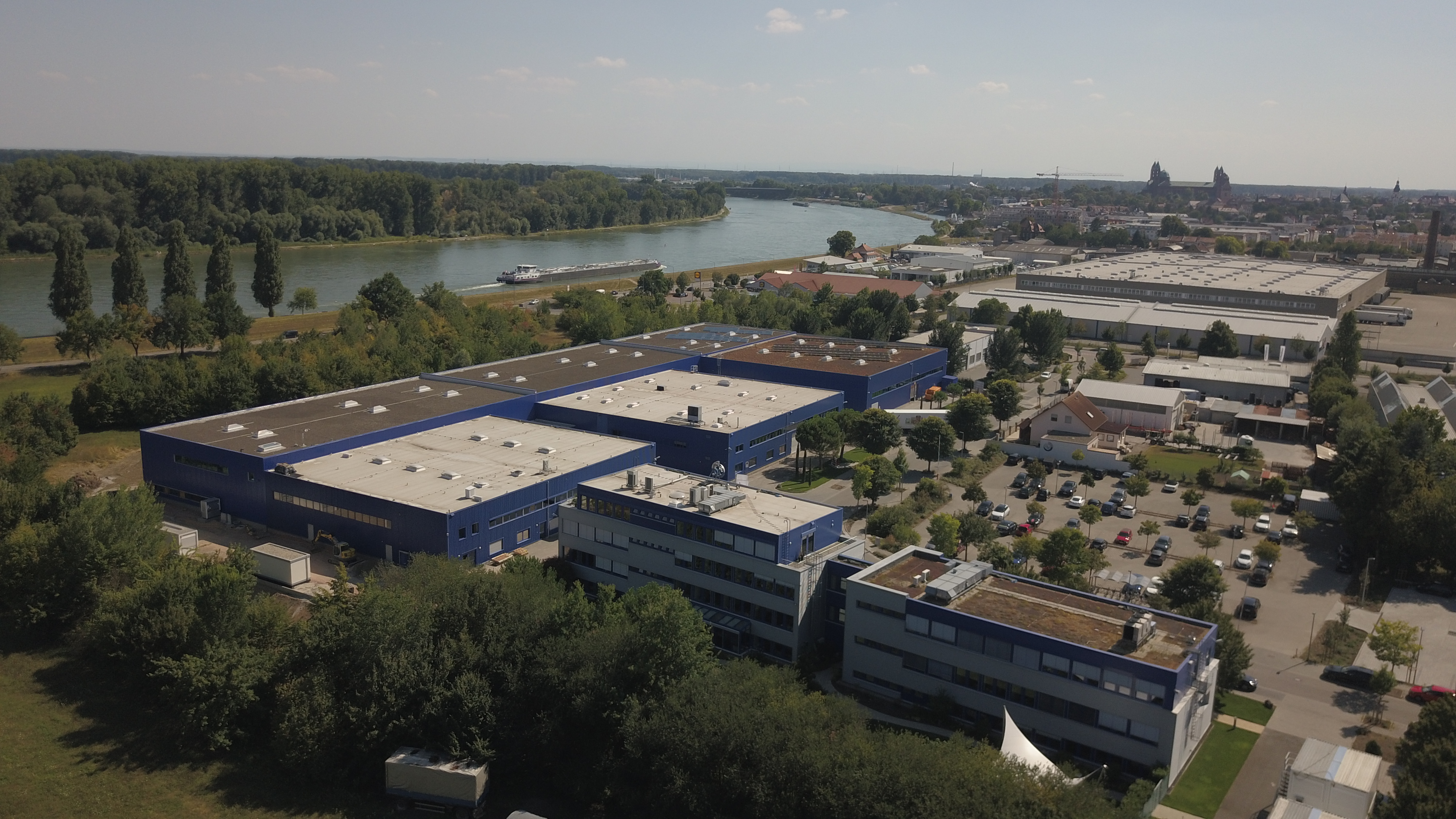
European Logistics Center (2020)

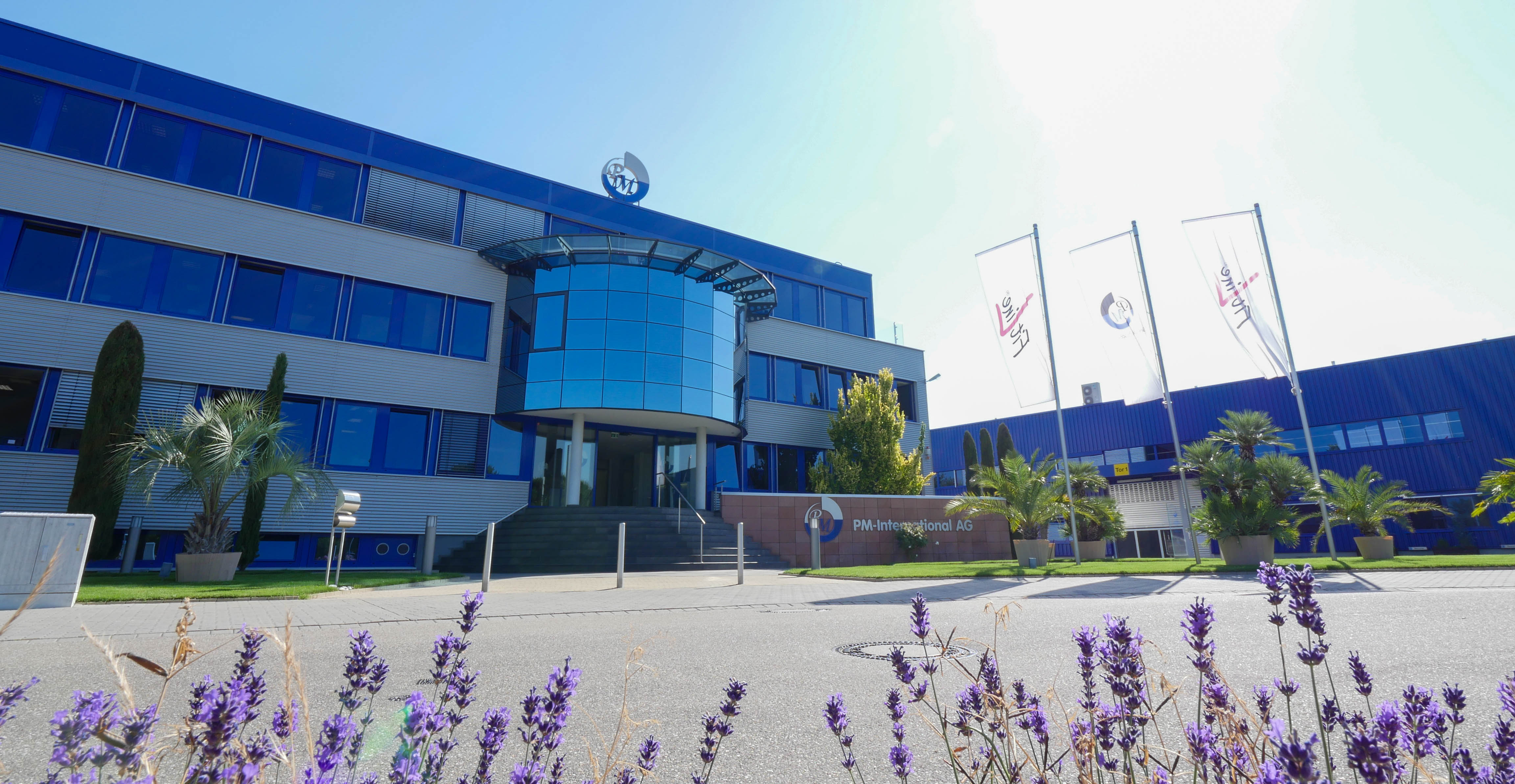
The European headquarters of the company (2019)

PM-International AG is a manufacturer of dietary supplements and cosmetics based in Schengen (Luxembourg).

== History ==
PM International was founded in 1993 by Rolf Sorg in Limburgerhof. In the same year, the first foreign branch office was opened in Poland. In 1994, the PM International holding company was founded in Schengen, Luxembourg. Since 2015, the company headquarters have been located there.

In 2003, the company opened a logistics center in Speyer (Rhineland-Palatinate). In 2005, the legal form was changed from a GmbH (limited liability company) to an unlisted stock corporation. In 2015, the company opened a headquarters for the Asia-Pacific region in Singapore.

In 2019, construction began on a fourth warehouse in Speyer, Germany. 2020 saw expansion to Arendonk in Belgium. In the same year, the company released its own payment system PM Direct Cash in Europe, with which sales partners receive their income directly at the conclusion of the purchase.

== Company structure ==
PM International has over 45 branches in more than 40 countries worldwide. According to Die Rheinpfalz, the company generated a revenue of USD 3.25 billion in the 2024 fiscal year. PM-International employs over 1,000 people worldwide, of whom more than 300 work at the logistics center in Speyer (2024). The company's products are sold through independent distributors in multi-level marketing, on the Internet and through its own direct sales force.

PM International is run as a family business, father Dieter Sorg is an engineer and responsible for the company's construction projects, wife Vicki Sorg looks after the social projects and Rolf Sorg's mother is also involved in the company. The company also maintains a research cooperation in the field of nutritional sciences with the FH Oberösterreich.

=== PM We Care ===
PM-International supports social projects through its own initiative "PM We Care." The company collaborates with aid organizations such as World Vision. In 2023, PM-International donated more than €2.67 million to education and health projects as well as for humanitarian emergency relief.

== Products ==
The company develops and produces exclusively products of its own brand FitLine. PM-International is also the official supplier of various sports teams and associations with its FitLine brand.

=== Sponsorship ===
The company cooperates with sports teams such as the German, Austrian and Polish Ski Associations, the German Ice Hockey Federation, the German Cycling Federation, the German Athletics Association, the Swiss Sliding Federation, the Luxembourg Handball Federation and the Luxembourg Basketball Federation.

On July 17, 2024, the ATP Tour and FitLine entered into a multi-year global partnership. Under the terms of the agreement, FitLine was designated as the official provider of sports nutrition and energy bars for the ATP Tour through 2026.

== Awards ==
- 2018: German Brand Award of the German Design Council and the German Brand Institute
- 2018: Charity Award of the industry magazine Network-Karriere
- 2019: German Brand Award of the German Design Council and the German Brand Institute
- 2020: German Brand Award of the German Design Council and the German Brand Institute, "Excellent Brands / Health & Pharmaceuticals".
- 2010-2022: Represented in the DSN Global 100: The Top Direct Selling Companies in the World list (rank 9 in 2022)
- 2021: Le Fonti Award
- 2022: Bravo International Growth Award + LeaderShip Award
- 2024: German Brand Award of the German Design Council and the German Brand Institute, Health & Pharmaceuticals
