= Nouveau Riche (college) =

U.S. multi-level marketing company

- Industry: Multi-level marketing, non-accredited trade school
- Founded: 2000; 26 years ago
- Founder: Jim Piccolo; Mary Piccolo
- Defunct: December 31, 2010
- Fate: Defunct
- Headquarters: United States
- Area served: United States

Nouveau Riche was a multi-level marketing company and a non-accredited vocational school specializing in real estate investing. Class topics ranged from introductory real estate investing to advanced techniques such as creative real estate investing techniques including wholesaling, multi-units, and short sales; examples of course titles are "Fix & Flip" and "Creative Financing."

The company takes its name from the French term nouveau riche, which refers to those with "new money," particularly in an ostentatious or vulgar manner, who created wealth within their own generation as opposed to inheriting a family fortune ("old money").

Nouveau Riche University closed down on December 31, 2010.

== The school ==
Nouveau Riche taught thousands of students from around the United States. In 2007 more than 9,000 people attended the college. There were three tuition schedules ranging between 30 and 120 instructional hours. Students could designate a partner to attend classes at no additional charge. Classes were taught using the principles of instructional systems design and multiple six-day college sessions were held throughout the year. Those students who were enrolled with the Regents tuition (98 percent of all students) could repeat classes for an additional year and have access to streaming video classrooms for select courses at no additional charge.

== History ==
Nouveau Riche was founded by Jim Piccolo and Mary Piccolo in 2000 with the inception of the company's educational programs occurring in 2002 through collaborative efforts with co-founder Bob Snyder. In December 2002, the corporate headquarters were established in Scottsdale, Arizona.

Nouveau Riche once had plans to construct a campus facility on a 30-acre (120,000 m^{2}) site overlooking the Phoenix, Arizona, valley. The 140,000-square-foot (13,000 m^{2}) campus was estimated to have a cost of $74 million and was planned to have administrative buildings, glass-and-steel classrooms and luxury dorms linked by a man-made river. The design of the complex was headed by Larson Associates Architects, Inc.

== Controversy ==
Fortune Small Business reported that the company's affiliated investment broker, Investor Concierge, markets properties as "positive cash flow", but the cash flow is often positive only because of temporary subsidies, putting the buyer at risk of negative cash flow after the subsidies expire.

The three founders have a background from Global Prosperity Group (GPG), which was "designed to be a scheme, device or artifice to defraud". When this scheme collapsed they founded the company Tru Dynamics, a MLM concept that later became the inspiration for the pyramid scheme Liberty League International, as several leaders left Tru Dynamics to create their own company.

== Arizona Corporations Commission fine ==
On February 17, 2011, the Arizona Corporation Commission announced that "[T]he Commission ordered James Piccolo of Scottsdale, Craig Cottrell of Tempe and Michael Roberts of Scottsdale and their affiliated companies to pay $5,577,226 in restitution and a total of $300,000 in administrative penalties for defrauding 105 investors with unregistered deed of trust investments. The Commission found that the men promoted the unregistered deed of trust investments at real estate education seminars where they convinced students to become investors, promising them double-digit returns."

== Notable alumni ==
Casey Serin (failed real estate investor deemed "the poster child for everything that went wrong in the real estate boom" by USA Today.) - in late 2006, Serin attended a week-long course at NRU's location in Phoenix, for which he paid $16,000.
