= Longrich =

Multi-level marketing company

Longrich BioScience
- Type: Subsidiary
- Industry: Direct selling
- Founded: 1986; 40 years ago, in Jiangsu province
- Founder: Xu Zhiwei
- Headquarters: Jiangsu province, China
- Area served: Worldwide
- Key people: Xu Zhiwei (executive chairman & CEO)
- Products: health products; organic food; nutritional supplements; cookware; cosmetics; personal care; homecare
- Revenue: ▲US$ 1 billion (2018)
- Number of employees: 12000+
- Parent: Jowell Global
- Website: www.globallongrich.com

Longrich Bioscience Co., Limited (Chinese: 隆力奇; pinyin: Lónglìqí) is a multinational company that sells health, organic food, nutritional supplements, beauty, home care and pet care products. Longrich operates under its holding company Jowell Global.

== History ==
The company was founded in 1986 by Xu Zhiwei (俆之伟), producing a variety of snake products to consumers in China and other countries. After attaining significant growth, he expanded into cosmetics manufacturing. Since the 1990s, Longrich has been very influential in the Chinese cosmetics industry. Longrich has been an OEM (original equipment manufacturer) and ODM (original design manufacturer) for some established multinational brands. Longrich researches, develops and manufactures a wide range of products through its corporate divisions across the globe and its main manufacturing plant at the Bio-Industrial Park, Jiangsu province of China. The Industrial Park covers an area of more than 2000 MU (about 500 acres). Longrich's research and development centers are located in the US, Japan, France and other parts of the world.

A manufacturing plant is under construction in the Lekki Free Trade Zone of Lagos, Nigeria.

== Business model ==
Longrich sells its products to end-users through a multi-level marketing (MLM) model. Longrich distributors can potentially make income by directly selling to people and also receive a commission on wholesale purchases made by people they recruit into the distribution network. Longrich distributors must purchase varying rates on a pro-rata basis either independently or as a team for starter kits to qualify. In addition, distributors can be compensated by selling the products in retail outlets. Longrich's affiliated companies and distributors operate in over 50 countries and territories globally.
