= FundAmerica =

Defunct American multi-level marketing company

There are two FundAmerica companies. The current and active FundAmerica is an SEC-compliant company offering tools for tech-driven securities offerings. It was acquired by Prime Trust and continues to be a product offering of Prime Trust.

On August 14, 2023, Prime Trust and FundAmerica's parent company, Prime Core Technologies, filed for Chapter 11 bankruptcy protection. It is currently in talks to sell all of its assets, including FundAmerica. Prime Trust will also request to continue to pay wages and provide benefits to ongoing employees as usual. For now, FundAmerica will continue to operate normally during the bankruptcy process.

The second is FundAmerica, Inc.. It was a discount buying club that marketed consumer buying club memberships through multi-level marketing. The business began in 1987 in Los Angeles, California before moving its offices to Irvine, California.

FundAmerica's founder, Robert T. Edwards, was arrested in July 1990 for allegedly running a pyramid scheme. FundAmerica filed for bankruptcy in August 1990 In late August 1990, Robert T. Edwards was fined $20.4 million dollars by Florida for running a pyramid scheme. In 1994 in Florida, the company pleaded no contest to a reduced charge of misrepresenting investors' odds of success and paid a $200,000 fine. A new company, FundAmerica 2000, was started with Robert Edwards as a consultant.
