= Celadrin (joint cream) =

Celadrin is an over-the-counter medication marketed as a topical analgesic. It is a cream that is used for muscle and joint pains including osteoarthritis, strains, bruises, and sprains. The active ingredient is menthol and it also contains cetylated and esterified fatty acids. The inactive ingredients are Benzyl Alcohol, Butylparaben, carbomer interpolymer type a (allyl sucrose crosslinked), ethylparaben, glycerin, glyceryl monostearate, isobutylparaben, soybean, methylparaben, olive oil, PEG-100 Stearate, peppermint oil, phenoxyethanol, sodium hydroxide, propylparaben, alpha-tocopherol acetate, and water.

Available forms

Celadrin is available in the form of pills and topical ointment.

== Uses ==
A before/after human study with no placebo control showed that one week of treatment with Celadrin was effective at reducing pain and improving functional performance in individuals with arthritis of the knee, elbow, and wrist.

Studies have proven that the effeicacy of Celadrin is strengthened when taken with Glucosamine Sulfate. According to HMP Education, Glucosamine Sulfate is one of several naturally occurring amino sugars that are essential for rebuilding and maintaining connective tissue via the stimulation of proteoglycan synthesis and inhibiting the degradation of proteoglycans. On its own, Glucosamine Sulfate is commonly prescribed to treat “inflammation, breakdown, and eventual loss of cartilage (osteoarthritis).” However, the relief is short-term. A double-blind study has recently proven that significant increase in effectivity when Glucosamine Sulfate is used in tandem with Celadrin. Resulting in a rapid increase in joint cushioning, cartilage regeneration, and reduction of inflammation.

== Adverse Effects ==
Clinical tests concluded that there are no side effects of Celadrin; nor is it dangerous or toxic at high dosages.
