= Tastefully Simple =

U.S. direct selling company

- Company type: Privately owned
- Industry: Multi-level marketing
- Founded: June 15, 1995
- Founders: Jill Blashack Strahan
- Headquarters: Alexandria, Minnesota, United States
- Area served: United States
- Website: tastefullysimple.com

Tastefully Simple, Inc. is a U.S. multi-level marketing company that sells meal kits as well as signature seasonings, sauces and baking mixes, all prepared by adding two additional ingredients or less. Their TS EatWell products, which constitute 85% of the product line, are clean-label foods that contain no artificial colors, flavors or preservatives. The products are sold through a network of home-based commissioned distributors and online. As of 2019, the company employed roughly 75 people at its headquarters in Alexandria, Minnesota.

== History ==
Tastefully Simple was founded on June 15, 1995, by Jill Blashack Strahan. First operated out of a small shed, the company later established its headquarters in Alexandria, MN. It was founded as a multi-level marketing company and this model continues to be its largest selling channel. The company reported sales revenue of $110 million in 2011 and $82 million in 2013. On July 8, 2014 the company laid off approximately 25% of its workforce. Tastefully Simple celebrated its 25th anniversary in 2020.

== Distributors ==
Tastefully Simple's multi-level marketing distributors, known as "Ambassadors," may be eligible to earn sales commissions on their own sales as well as additional income based on the sales of distributors who they recruit, and additional bonuses and incentives, including travel. The company reported having 23,680 distributors as of 2011.

== See also ==
- List of Minnesota companies
