= Seacret =

American cosmetics company

- Trade name: Seacret
- Type: Private
- Industry: Cosmetics, personal care, mall kiosks, multi-level marketing
- Founded: 2005 (21 years ago)
- Founder: Izhak Ben Shabat; Moty Ben Shabat
- Headquarters: Israel, Phoenix, Arizona
- Number of locations: (2019)
- Area served: U.S., Canada, South Korea, Mexico, Japan, Colombia
- Key people: Izhak Ben Shabat (President and CEO); Moty Ben Shabat (managing partner); Betty Perez (co-founder, Secret Direct)
- Products: Cosmetics, personal care
- Brands: Seacret Direct; SevenPoint2; AClear
- Revenue: US$ 211.5 million (unaudited) (2018)
- Members: (2014)
- Number of employees: 280
- Website: www.seacret.com

Seacret Spa Ltd. is an Israel-based company that grew out of a mall kiosk retailing business launched in 2000 by brothers Izhak and Moty Ben Shabat. It was established in 2005 as a producer-retailer of Seacret-branded cosmetic and other personal care products made from Dead Sea salt, mud and minerals.

Seacret Direct, rebranded in 2024 as Viago, is a United States-based company that was spun off by the brothers and an additional partner Betty Perez in 2011 and formerly operated a multi-level marketing (MLM) program to sell the Seacret brand products.

Seacret product marketing became the subject of controversy regarding illegal immigration schemes of mall kiosk operators and overly aggressive sales tactics in the United States, Canada, and New Zealand, and the MLM program operated by Seacret Direct was eventually discontinued. In 2020, Seacret Direct merged with the leisure travel-related company WorldVentures, and in 2024, Secret Direct rebranded itself as Viago and began offering Club Viago, a lifestyle membership program for travel experiences, events, and discounts.

Seacret Spa Ltd. continues to own the Seacret brand trademark and to produce Dead Sea–related cosmetics and personal care products. Seacret-branded cosmetics that are not derived from Dead Sea materials are also sold by the company.

== History ==
In 2000, brothers Izhak and Moty Ben Shabat began selling products out of kiosks in shopping malls, initially starting with toys and then focusing on skin care products made in Israel using salts, minerals and mud from the Dead Sea. They founded Seacret Spa International as a skin care retail business in 2005. Izhak was company president and CEO, while Moty was managing partner. By 2010, the company claimed to have had retailers in 30 countries and revenue of US$100 million. The kiosks became very prevalent in many shopping malls in the United States, staffed by employees who were largely recruited from Israel with promises of work in the United States and were known for their aggressive sales tactics, long working hours, and difficult employment and living conditions.

In 2011, the brothers partnered with Betty Perez, who had been successful as a salesperson at a Seacret kiosk, and founded Seacret Direct, a company based in Phoenix, Arizona, that sold Seacret products through a network of independent distributors using a multi-level marketing program. The distributors were known as "Seacret Agents". Perez had come up with the direct sales concept in 2009 when she was only 19 years old, and approached the brothers with the idea. Seacret Direct reported unaudited revenue of $12 million in 2012, $71 million in 2013, and $211.5 million in 2018.

Seacret expanded to Canada and Australia in 2013, followed by South Korea and Mexico in 2014, Japan in 2015, and Colombia in 2019. A flagship store for the brand was opened in Mumbai, India, in 2013.

Mall kiosks selling Seacret products in the U.S., Canada, and New Zealand became the subject of controversy, evictions, and law enforcement actions regarding illegal immigration schemes and overly aggressive sales tactics. U.S. authorities began investigating illegal immigration and forced labor employment issues involving Seacret kiosks as early as 2007, and they expressed concerns about kiosks operated in 36 states of the United States and in Australia, the UK and Germany. In December 2011, 29 people working illegally at kiosks in Ottawa and Gatineau, Canada, were arrested and ordered to leave the country after admitting to illegal employment. After multiple complaints of salespeople preying upon elderly and mentally weak customers, the Westfield Mall chain evicted the kiosks from all of its malls in New Zealand in 2014. In 2016, ten Israelis were arrested in Virginia and a man who had been operating kiosks in seven U.S. states primarily for Seacret (along with two other companies) with staffing by Israelis who were working illegally was convicted of conspiracy to defraud the United States and conspiracy to launder money and was sentenced to six-and-a-half years in prison.

In November 2020, Seacret Direct announced its merger with WorldVentures.
