= Royal Tongan Limu =

Defunct American multi-level marketing company

Royal Tongan Limu was a seaweed extract product manufactured and distributed by Dynamic Essentials, a now defunct multilevel marketing company based in Lake Mary, Florida, until legal issues with the U.S. Food and Drug Administration forced the company's closure in 2003. Subsequently, NBTY, Inc., the parent company of Dynamic Essentials, was ordered to pay a US$2 million settlement in a class action suit launched by the U.S. Federal Trade Commission and Department of Justice in response to misleading and illegal claims made about the purported health benefits of Royal Tongan Limu.

== Key Personnel ==
- Gary Raser, chief executive officer
- Dallin Larsen, Vice President of Sales
