= Fuel Freedom International =

American multi-level marketing company

- Industry: multi-level marketing
- Headquarters: Altamonte Springs, Florida
- Owners: Wendy Lewis, Randy Ray

Fuel Freedom International is a multi-level marketing company based in Altamonte Springs, Florida and co-owned by Wendy Lewis and Randy Ray. It sells pills trademarked as MPG-CAPS, which are claimed to improve fuel economy, reduce emissions and increase engine power when used as a gasoline additive.

The company says that the product was "originally developed by NASA for the 1970s space shuttle program", although no documentary evidence is offered to support this claim.

== EPA registration ==
The product is EPA registered per 40 CFR 79.23 - a requirement for all gasoline additives sold in the US. Registration involves providing a chemical description of the product and certain technical, marketing and health-effects information. The EPA did not test the claims of increased engine power and reduced emissions, and does not endorse, certify or approve the product. The company report attached to the EPA report (EPA Internal identification number 218820001) "provides technical documentation for this product as a lead replacement in gasoline for use in engines susceptible to valve seat recession".

== Distribution ==
The company retails MPG-CAPS directly or through multi-level marketing via "independent distributors". To become a distributor there is an initial buy-in and an emphasis on the necessity of recruiting other people in order to receive commissions. This follows the structure of multi-level marketing, although there are recruiting bonuses after three retail sales a month as an incentive to grow the sales force, the majority of the cash-flow is said to be generated by commissions on sales.

== Independent testing ==
An example of a recognised independent testing program to "evaluate aftermarket retrofit devices which claim to improve automotive fuel economy and/or reduce exhaust emissions" is that run by the US Environmental Protection Agency (EPA) identified by test program authorities 42 USC 7525 and 49 USC 32918, and formerly known as the "511 Program". The EPA requires a formal statement that the test laboratory "shall have no financial interests in the outcome of these tests other than the fee charged for each test performed". The Federal Test Procedure comprises a simulated city drive trace, and a simulated highway drive test. The tests are conducted in triplicate using two different vehicles. The vehicles should be from two different manufacturers and should be examples of the largest selling engine/transmission combinations on the US market. Tests are conducted in a "back-to-back" fashion. In the case of fuel additives that don't require an engine retune, then triplicate tests with and without the additive are required. The tests on MPG-Caps do not apparently conform to this standard. Examples of such tests are:

- A study conducted by ABC News affiliate WPVI found no improvement at lower speeds and only a 4% improvement at highway speeds.
- Tests by a former distributor in the program used "70 tablets to test 7 vehicles in Missouri and California (three gas vehicles and four diesel trucks) according to the FFI instructions. All the test showed an initial improvement but then showed no improvement over a longer period of time and most of them showed less mpg than the vehicles were getting before any usage".
