= Vemma =

Multi-level marketing company

Coordinates: 33.643787°N 111.899148°W

Vemma Nutrition Company
- Type: Private
- Industry: Dietary supplements
- Predecessor: New Vision International
- Founded: Tempe, Arizona (2004)
- Founder: Benson K. Boreyko
- Defunct: 2015
- Headquarters: Tempe, Arizona, United States
- Area served: Worldwide
- Key people: Benson K. Boreyko (CEO); Karen Boreyko (co-founder); Lauren Boreyko (co-founder); Brad Wayment (COO); Yibing Wang (Chief Scientific Officer); Adrian Berry (Chief Medical Officer)
- Products: Vemma, Verve, Bod·ē, NEXT
- Website: vemma.com

Vemma (/ˈviːmə/) Nutrition Company was a privately held multi-level marketing company that sold dietary supplements. The company was shut down in 2015 by the FTC for engaging in deceptive practices and being a pyramid scheme.

The company, based in Tempe, Arizona, was founded in 2004 by Benson K., Lauren, and Karen Boreyko. In 2013, the company reported US$221 million in revenue. Most distributors were in their twenties. The company had frequently been accused of being a pyramid scheme by U.S. media, business analysts, and former distributors, and was fined by the Italian government. The Boreykos later formed Bodē Pro in 2017, and merged the legacy Vemma products into the new company in 2018. In 2025, Bodē Pro was purchased by Swedish MLM company Zinzino.

== History ==
Starting in the 1990s, the Boreyko family have been incorporating dozens of companies under the family's control sharing the same address. In 1994, the family founded New Vision International, a nutritional supplement company. The family also owns a limited liability corporation which has purchased commercial real estate, including property rented back to other Boreyko-controlled companies. Vemma Nutrition Company was incorporated in 2004, and by 2011, New Vision had been entirely folded into Vemma.

Vemma sold its products through its website, and also through independent distributors (referred to internally as affiliates) who could potentially earn a share of the revenue from their own product sales as well as those from the network of distributors they build.

In 2013, Vemma started describing itself as an affiliate marketing company, although Benson K. Boreyko has said that the compensation plan is the same. Vemma is a member of the U.S. Direct Selling Association.

In April 2014, the company announced that it was modifying its compensation plan by removing sign-up fees and the $150 minimum monthly product purchase to qualify for commission, among other things. Boreyko stated that the changes were intended to avoid the fallout from the Federal Trade Commission that has happened to other multi-level marketing companies, such as Herbalife. An analysis by advertising watchdog group Truth in Advertising has described this as a red herring, as the company has never required sign-up fees. The group's report also says that minimum monthly purchases are still required for full eligibility, which Boreyko has said is false.

In August 2015, the U.S. Federal Trade Commission filed a lawsuit against Vemma, accusing the company of operating an illegal pyramid scheme. The company was placed under an injunction which restricts certain marketing activity and compensation methods, and a monitor was appointed by the court to assure compliance with these restrictions. In December 2016, Vemma reached a $238 million settlement with the FTC, which also banned the company, its CEO, and top distributors from recruitment-focused business ventures, deceptive income claims, and unsubstantiated health claims.

== Business model ==
Vemma was a multi-level marketing (MLM) company.

=== Use of college-aged distributors ===
Vemma heavily focused on recruiting college-aged people as distributors, which has brought attention from consumer organizations, and complaints from parents. As of July 2014, the Federal Trade Commission (FTC) received 170 complaints about Vemma and some colleges have issued warnings to their students about the company.

William Keep, the dean of business at The College of New Jersey and an expert in pyramid schemes has said that the company shows indicators of being a pyramid scheme. Keep became aware of Vemma when he found out that a student had been stockpiling unsold energy drinks in his dorm room. Keep and other analysts, as well as former distributors have claimed the company relies on recruiting as its main means of generating revenue.

In May 2015, the magazine Stern reported that German and Austrian consumer protection organizations warned that Vemma was exploiting naive customers and unemployed youths who were lured with unrealistic profit expectations into a distribution system that was losing them money.

== Products ==
Vemma had four product lines, all based on their core Vemma nutritional formulation: Vemma, Verve, Bod-e and Next. The name "Vemma" is an acronym representing: vitamins, essential minerals, mangosteen, aloe. Internally affiliates used the VEMMA acronym to describe the role of an affiliate as a "Very Exciting Money Making Activity". Several of the company's products contain caffeine, with some drinks in the Verve line being similar in caffeine content to energy drinks. The "Verve" line was one of the official drinks (along with Gatorade) of the Phoenix Suns, which also acted as a distributor.

== Government investigations ==
=== New Vision International ===
Vemma was preceded by New Vision International, a Tempe, Arizona-based dietary supplement company founded by Benson Boreyko and his family in 1994. In 1999, New Vision International was ordered by the FTC to stop making claims that one of its products ("God's Recipe") was a cure or treatment for attention deficit hyperactivity disorder (ADD/ADHD). New Vision was accused in the FTC complaint of "unfair or deceptive acts or practices, and the making of false advertisements" about the health benefits of some of their products. In the Decision & Order, the FTC ordered New Vision to stop making various claims; specifically they were ordered (1) to stop saying that one of their product recipes was effective in treating ADD or ADHD, or useful as an alternative to Ritalin; (2) that they not indicate or imply that any testimonial or endorsement of any of their products is typical or ordinary; and (3), that they make no claims about safety or effectiveness in reducing the risk of developing any disease or disorder; and that they communicate all this to their team members in mailings. According to the FTC, that was the first time they had investigated a case involving ADD/ADHD. New Vision settled with the FTC, but did not admit to any wrongdoing.

=== Italian pyramid scheme accusations ===
In March 2014, the Italian consumer protection agency, Autorità Garante della Concorrenza e del Mercato (AGCM), fined Vemma Italia (Vemma's Italian branch) €100,000. The AGCM found that Vemma was acting as a pyramid scheme by encouraging recruitment as the primary means of profit, rather than product sales. Vemma issued a statement that it does not believe it was in violation of the law, and that the company has made a number of changes in response to the government's concerns. An analysis by Truth in Advertising determined that Vemma's new compensation plan is not significantly different from the one that the Italian regulators found to be a pyramid scheme.

=== Investigations in Austria and Switzerland ===
In April 2015 Truth in Advertising announced that two countries were pursuing legal action against Vemma. The State Secretariat for Economic Affairs (SECO) of Switzerland's Federal Department of Economic Affairs reported Vemma to a prosecutor to pursue criminal charges for running a pyramid scheme. The charges were filed due to multiple complaints, the nature of which are not public until a judgement has been reached.

In Austria, the Vorarlberg Chamber of Labor's Consumer Protection Division said that it would pursue criminal proceedings against the company for being a pyramid scheme. In August 2014, the agency had issued a statement warning consumers against becoming involved with the company.

=== Shutdown by FTC ===
On August 21, 2015, the U.S. Federal Trade Commission filed a lawsuit against Vemma, freezing the company's assets and seeking injunctive relief for consumer redress. The FTC alleged that Vemma was a pyramid scheme; that Vemma had misrepresented participants' earning potential; and that the Boreyko family had inappropriately incorporated dozens of companies with the same staff, facilities, and commingled funding. The restraining order was set to expire fourteen days later unless extended. The company itself, CEO Benson Boreyko, and distributor Tom Alkazin were named as defendants.

On September 18, 2015, the judge ruled that Vemma had been operating as a pyramid scheme and that their marketing material had been "deceptive and misleading". Accordingly, the judge appointed a monitor to oversee their business, and barred them from resuming normal operations.

==== Penalty ====
In a September 2016 judgement, Vemma reached a settlement agreement with the FTC, wherein Vemma Nutrition Company, Vemma's CEO Benson Boreyko, as well as Tom Alkazin and Alkazin's wife, Bethany, agreed to a permanent injunction and monetary penalties.

Vemma Nutrition Company was ordered to pay a US$238 million fine as a company, restructure its compensation plan, and forfeit certain company assets. The Alkazins, on the other hand, were fined US$6.7 million as individuals.

As part of the settlement the defendants were banned "from involvement in any pyramid, Ponzi, or chain marketing schemes."
