= Excel Communications =

American multi-level marketing company

Excel Communications, Inc.
- Company type: Public
- Traded as: NYSE: ECI
- Industry: Telecommunications, multi-level marketing
- Founded: 1988; 37 years ago, in Dallas, Texas, United States
- Founder: Kenny Troutt
- Defunct: 2004; 21 years ago
- Fate: Bankrupted, acquired by Comtel Telecom Assets
- Key people: Kenny Troutt (founder, former CEO); Christina Gold (CEO)
- Services: long distance telephone carrier
- Website: www.excel.com

Excel Communications, Inc. was a multi-level marketing (MLM) telecommunications company that was, at one point, America's fifth largest long-distance carrier after AT&T, MCI, Sprint, and Worldcom.

== Company history ==
Excel was founded in 1988 by Dallas entrepreneur Kenny Troutt and Steve Smith, as a long-distance reseller in the US telecom sector at the birth of telecom deregulation. In the mid-1980s, Smith developed an interest in the network marketing business model. He recognized the marketing and compensation strategy was suited for the marketing and distribution of services, rather than physical products. He designed and deployed his network-marketing strategy at a telecommunication startup company; this concept grew to become Excel—a billion-dollar publicly traded long-distance company. Excel reached a billion dollars in revenues, nine years faster than Microsoft. On May 10, 1996, Excel became the youngest company to join the New York Stock Exchange (NYSE), trading under the symbol (ECI). In June 1997, Excel acquired Telco Communications Group. Before the purchase, Excel had to resell long-distance service through other companies' networks, such as Frontier Communications. In November 1998, Excel merged with Teleglobe. Kenny Troutt retired as CEO on September 20, 1999, and was replaced by Christina Gold.

Excel–Teleglobe was taken over by Teleglobe's major shareholder, Bell Canada. Bell Canada then demoted Excel separately to a subsidiary and eventually spun it off to a private company, VarTec Communications, which required FTC approval to return to the private sector. After approval, VarTec continued the network marketing business model. On November 1, 2004, VarTec Communications (the parent corporation of Excel) unexpectedly filed for Chapter 11 bankruptcy protection. Excel sought to be released from its contracts with its independent representatives. This allowed it to continue to receive revenue from its large base of installed customers, without paying eternal commissions to the franchisees. Excel continued to operate, but ceased to be a multi-level marketing company. Although the change created cash enabling it to pay creditors, it was seen as shortsighted by the franchisee association, because it removed the primary source of sales and customer loyalty.

In September 2005, the Federal Communications Commission (FCC) approved the transfer of licenses to Comtel Telecom Assets, LLP and on June 12, 2006, the company emerged from bankruptcy under its new ownership, announcing a return to a slightly revised version of its former name, Excel Telecom. On March 16, 2010, Matrix Business Technologies announced it would acquire the customers and substantially all the assets of Comtel Telecom Assets, LLP.
