= Pyramid scheme =

Type of unsustainable business model

The unsustainable exponential progression of a classic pyramid scheme in which every member recruits six new people. To sustain the scheme, the 2.2 billion people in the 12th layer would be required to recruit 13.1 billion more people for the 13th layer, even though there are not nearly enough people in the world to achieve that.

A pyramid scheme or pyramid scam is a fraudulent business model in which participants earn money primarily by recruiting new members rather than by selling products or services to end consumers or by generating genuine investment returns.

Pyramid schemes depend on an ever-growing number of recruits, making them inherently unsustainable. As recruitment inevitably becomes insufficient to sustain the scheme, most participants—particularly those who join later—lose money, while only a small number of people near the top of the pyramid profit. Consequently, pyramid schemes are a form of fraud and are illegal in many countries.

Pyramid schemes have existed in various forms since at least the mid-to-late 19th century. Although some multi-level marketing (MLM) companies have been found to operate as pyramid schemes, legitimate MLM businesses are distinguished by compensation based primarily on retail sales to end consumers rather than recruitment.

== Concept and basic models ==
In a pyramid scheme, an organization compels individuals who wish to join to make a payment. In exchange, the organization promises its new members a share of the money taken from every additional member that they recruit. The directors of the organization (those at the top of the pyramid) also receive a share of these payments. For the directors, the scheme is potentially lucrative—whether or not they do any work, the organization's membership has a strong incentive to continue recruiting and funneling money to the top of the pyramid.

Such organizations seldom involve sales of products or services with value. Without creating any goods or services, the only revenue streams for the scheme are recruiting more members or soliciting more money from current members. The behavior of pyramid schemes follows the mathematics concerning exponential growth quite closely. Each level of the pyramid is much larger than the one before it. For a pyramid scheme to make money for everyone who enrolls in it, it would have to expand indefinitely. When the scheme inevitably runs out of new recruits, lacking other sources of revenue, it collapses. Since the biggest terms in this geometric sequence are at the end, most people will be in the lower levels of the pyramid; accordingly, the bottom layer of the pyramid contains the most people. The people working for pyramid schemes try to promote the actual company instead of the product they are selling. Eventually, all of the people at the lower levels of the pyramid do not make any money; only the people at the top turn a profit. In particular, when the scheme collapses, members in the bottom layers did not have any opportunity to profit from the scheme; still, they have already paid to join. Therefore, a pyramid scheme is characterized by a few people (including the creators of the scheme) making large amounts of money, while subsequent members lose money. For this reason, they are considered scams.

=== The "eight ball" model ===
The "eight-ball" model contains a total of fifteen members. Note that it is a representation of the arithmetic progression 1 + 2 + 3 + 4 + 5 = 15. The pyramid scheme in the picture in contrast is a geometric progression 1 + 2 + 4 + 8 = 15.

Many pyramids are more sophisticated than the simple model. These recognize that recruiting a large number of others into a scheme can be difficult, so a seemingly simpler model is used. In this model each person must recruit two others, but the ease of achieving this is offset because the depth required to recoup any money also increases. The scheme requires a person to recruit two others, who must each recruit two others, and so on.

Prior instances of this scheme have been called the "Airplane Game" and the four tiers labelled as "captain", "co-pilot", "crew", and "passenger" to denote a person's level. Another instance was called the "Original Dinner Party" which labeled the tiers as "dessert", "main course", "side salad", and "appetizer". A person on the "dessert" course is the one at the top of the tree. Another variant, "Treasure Traders", variously used gemology terms such as "polishers", "stone cutters", etc. One version called the Abundance Fractal uses the four elements as the names of tiers: "Fire", "Air", "Earth", and "Water". A more recent variation known as the Living Workshop takes the names of plants, calling the tiers "seed", "sapling", "blossom", and "lotus".

Such schemes may try to downplay their pyramid nature by referring to themselves as "gifting circles" with money being "gifted". Others focus on sharing circles or educational themes around "abundance" to divert attention away from the unsustainable structure. Popular schemes such as "Women Empowering Women" do exactly this.

Whichever euphemism is used, there are 15 total people in four tiers (1 + 2 + 4 + 8) in the scheme—with the Airplane Game as the example, the person at the top of this tree is the "captain", the two below are "co-pilots", the four below are "crew", and the bottom eight joiners are the "passengers".

At ten levels deep, the "airplane game" has an 87% loss rate.

The eight passengers must each pay (or "gift") a sum (e.g., $5,000) to join the scheme. This sum (e.g., $40,000) goes to the captain, who leaves, with everyone remaining moving up one tier. There are now two new captains so the group splits in two with each group requiring eight new passengers. A person who joins the scheme as a passenger will not see a return until they advance through the crew and co-pilot tiers and exit the scheme as a captain. Therefore, the participants in the bottom three tiers of the pyramid lose their money if the scheme collapses.

If a person is using this model as a scam, the confidence trickster would take the majority of the money. They would do this by filling in the first three tiers (with one, two, and four people) with phony names, ensuring they get the first seven payouts, at eight times the buy-in sum, without paying anything themselves. So if the buy-in were $5,000, they would receive $40,000, paid for by the first eight investors. They would continue to buy in underneath the real investors, and promote and prolong the scheme for as long as possible to allow them to skim even more from it before it collapses.

Although the "captain" is the person at the top of the tree, having received the payment from the eight paying passengers, once they leave the scheme they are able to re-enter the pyramid as a "passenger" and hopefully recruit enough to reach captain again, thereby earning a second payout.

=== Blessing Loom ===
The "Blessing Loom" is identical to the classic "Airplane Game", with a circular diagram obscuring the pyramid structure.

Similar to the eight ball model, the Blessing Loom tricks potential investors by claiming to turn $100 into $800. This scheme has a circular structure, as increases in new recruits pushes individuals closer to the center of the circle, hence the "Loom" in the name. Each participant needs to recruit two people without providing them with any service or product. The scam often resurfaces online across the globe, under different aliases such as "loom circle" or "fractal mandala". The Blessing Loom scheme has been ruled as illegal in multiple US cities.

=== Franchise fraud ===
Franchise fraud is defined by the United States Federal Bureau of Investigation as a pyramid scheme. The FBI website states:

Pyramid schemes—also referred to as franchise fraud or chain referral schemes—are marketing and investment frauds in which an individual is offered a distributorship or franchise to market a particular product. The real profit is earned, not by the sale of the product, but by the sale of new distributorships. Emphasis on selling franchises rather than the product eventually leads to a point where the supply of potential investors is exhausted and the pyramid collapses.

=== Matrix schemes ===
Matrix schemes use the same fraudulent, unsustainable system as a pyramid; here, the participants pay to join a waiting list for a desirable product, which only a fraction of them can ever receive. Since matrix schemes follow the same laws of geometric progression as pyramids, they are subsequently as doomed to collapse.

Such schemes operate as a queue, where the person at head of the queue receives an item such as a television, games console, digital camcorder, etc. when a certain number of new people join the end of the queue. For example, ten joiners may be required for the person at the front to receive their item and leave the queue. Each joiner is required to buy an expensive but potentially worthless item, such as an e-book, for their position in the queue. The scheme organizer profits because the income from joiners far exceeds the cost of sending out the item to the person at the front. Organizers can further profit by starting a scheme with a queue with shill names that must be cleared out before genuine people get to the front. The scheme collapses when no more people are willing to join the queue.

Schemes may not reveal, or may attempt to exaggerate, a prospective joiner's queue position, a condition that essentially means the scheme is a lottery. Some countries have ruled that matrix schemes are illegal on that basis.

== Relation to Ponzi schemes ==
While often confused with each other, pyramid schemes and Ponzi schemes are different. Pyramid schemes are based on network marketing, where each person in the pyramid is tasked with bringing in their own subordinates and in turn profiting from their sales or recruitments. This fails because it essentially requires an infinite number of people to join the company. In a Ponzi scheme, participants are promised returns on "investments", supposedly into stocks or goods, but which are actually paid for by new investors, while a central leading figure takes a portion as profit.

== Connection to multi-level marketing ==
Some multi-level marketing (MLM) companies operate as pyramid schemes and consumers often confuse legitimate multi-level marketing with pyramid schemes.

According to the U.S. Federal Trade Commission (FTC) legitimate MLM businesses are distinguished from pyramid schemes by participants making money primarily from product sales, rather than recruitment:

Not all multi-level marketing plans are legitimate. If the money you make is based on your sales to the public, it may be a legitimate multilevel marketing plan. If the money you make is based on the number of people you recruit and your sales to them, it's probably not. It could be a pyramid scheme.

In contrast, pyramid schemes "may purport to sell a product", but often "simply use the product to hide their pyramid structure". While some people call MLMs in general "pyramid selling", others use the term to denote an illegal pyramid scheme masquerading as a MLM.

The U.S. Federal Trade Commission warns against becoming involved "in plans where the money you make is based primarily on the number of distributors you recruit and your sales to them, rather than on your sales to people outside the plan who intend to use the products."

Some commentators contend that MLMs in general are nothing more than legalized pyramid schemes. Local laws may vary, and they take different actions toward pyramid schemes, but multi-level-marketing is often legal. Multi-level marketing lobbying groups have pressured US government regulators to maintain the legal status of such schemes.

== Legality ==
Pyramid schemes are illegal in many countries or regions including Albania, Austria, Belgium, Bahrain, Bangladesh, Brazil, Canada, China, Colombia, Denmark, the Dominican Republic, Estonia, Finland, Germany, Hong Kong, Hungary, Iceland, India, Indonesia, Iran, Ireland, Italy, Japan, Malaysia, the Maldives, Mexico, Nepal, the Netherlands, New Zealand, Norway, Oman, Peru, the Philippines, Poland, Portugal, Romania, Russia, Serbia, South Africa, Singapore, Spain, Ethiopia, Sri Lanka, Sweden, Switzerland, Taiwan, Thailand, Trinidad and Tobago, Turkey, Ukraine, the United Kingdom, and the United States.

== Notable cases ==
The 1997 Albanian civil unrest was partially motivated by the collapse of Ponzi schemes; however, they were widely referred to as pyramid schemes due to their prevalence in Albanian society.

In 2003, the United States Federal Trade Commission (FTC) disclosed what it called an Internet-based "pyramid scam." Its complaint states that customers would pay a registration fee to join a program that called itself an "internet mall" and purchase a package of goods and services such as internet mail, and that the company offered "significant commissions" to consumers who purchased and resold the package. The FTC alleged that the company's program was instead and in reality a pyramid scheme that did not disclose that most consumers' money would be kept, and that it gave affiliates material that allowed them to scam others.

In early 2006, Ireland was hit by a wave of schemes with major activity in Cork and Galway. Participants were asked to contribute €20,000 each to a "Liberty" scheme which followed the classic eight-ball model. Payments were made in Munich, Germany, to skirt Irish tax laws concerning gifts. Spin-off schemes called "Speedball" and "People in Profit" prompted a number of violent incidents and calls were made by politicians to tighten existing legislation. Ireland has launched a website to better educate consumers to pyramid schemes and other scams.

On 12 November 2008, riots broke out in the municipalities of Pasto, Tumaco, Popayán and Santander de Quilichao, Colombia, after the collapse of several pyramid schemes. Thousands of victims had invested their money in pyramids that promised them extraordinary interest rates. The lack of regulatory laws allowed those pyramids to grow excessively for several years. Finally, after the riots, the Colombian government was forced to declare the country in a state of economic emergency to seize and stop those schemes. Several of the pyramid's managers were arrested, and prosecuted for the crime of "illegal massive money reception."

The Kyiv Post reported on 26 November 2008 that American citizen Robert Fletcher (Robert T. Fletcher III; aka "Rob") was arrested by the SBU (Ukraine State Police) after being accused by Ukrainian investors of running a Ponzi scheme and associated pyramid scam netting US$20 million. (The Kyiv Post also reported that some estimates were as high as US$150 million.)

In the United Kingdom in 2008 and 2009, a £21 million pyramid scheme named 'Give and Take' involved at least 10,000 victims in the south-west of England and South Wales. Leaders of the scheme were prosecuted and served time in jail before being ordered to pay £500,000 in compensation and costs in 2015. The cost of bringing the prosecution was in excess of £1.4 million.

A number of authorities around the world declared TVI Express to be a pyramid scheme in 2010 and 2011, including the Australian Competition & Consumer Commission, the Bank of Namibia, and the Central Bank of Lesotho. TVI Express, operated by Tarun Trikha from India, has apparently recruited hundreds of thousands of "investors", very few of whom, it is reported, have recouped any of their investment.

BurnLounge, Inc. was a multi-level marketing digital music store founded in 2004 and based in New York City. By 2006 the company reported 30,000 members using the site to sell music through its network. In 2007, the Federal Trade Commission sued the company for being an illegal pyramid scheme. The company lost the suit in 2012, and lost appeal in June 2014. In June 2015, the FTC began returning $1.9 million to people who had lost money in the scheme.

In August 2015, the United States FTC filed a lawsuit against Vemma Nutrition Company, an Arizona-based dietary supplement Multi-Level Marketing firm, accused of operating an illegal pyramid scheme. In December 2016, Vemma agreed to a $238 million settlement with the FTC, which banned the company from "pyramid scheme practices" including recruitment-focused business ventures, deceptive income claims, and unsubstantiated health claims.

In March 2017, Ufun Store, registered as an online business for its members as a direct-sales company, was declared to be operating a pyramid scheme in Thailand. The Criminal Court sentenced 22 people to prison terms totalling 12,265 to 12,267 years over the scheme, which conned about 120,000 people out of more than 20 billion baht.

The Airplane Game scheme resurfaced in 2020 as a savings club by the name of the Blessing Loom, Blessing Circle, Sending Flower, Gifting Flower, and so on. It is also misrepresented as a Sou-Sou, a legitimate savings club model where the number of people paying into the pot is fixed and each person gets a payout regularly. This is distinct from the pyramid scheme variation making use of the hierarchical flower model, where new members are continually recruited into the group by people at the edges of the flower. This re-imagining of the old Airplane/8-ball model is making a resurgence on social media platforms such as Instagram and Zoom.

A US district court sentenced Karl Sebastian Greenwood, a co-founder of OneCoin, to 20 years in prison and ordered him to pay US$300 million in restitution. According to US authorities, the OneCoin scheme was based in Bulgaria. It sold cryptocurrency through multi-level marketing and took in more than US$4 billion from investors worldwide.

== See also ==
- Aman Futures Group
- BurnLounge
- Claims of Social Security in the US as a pyramid scheme
- Cryptocurrency
  - Cryptocurrency bubble
- Elite Activity
- Gift
- Holiday Magic
- Make Money Fast
- Non-fungible token
- Nouveau Riche (college)
- Qnet
- Ponzi scheme
- Success University
- The Cobra Group
