= Helen DeVos =

American philanthropist and political donor (1927–2017)

Helen June DeVos
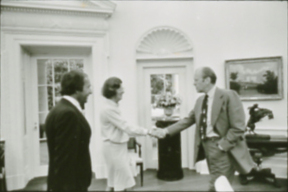
- Devos and her husband with President Gerald Ford, 1974
- Born: Helen June Van Wesep; February 24, 1927; Grand Rapids, Michigan, U.S.
- Died: October 18, 2017 (aged 90); Ada Township, Michigan, U.S.
- Education: Frankfort High School; Calvin College
- Occupation: Philanthropist
- Spouse: Richard DeVos (m. 1953)
- Children: Dick; Dan; Doug; Cheri
- Relatives: Betsy DeVos (daughter-in-law)

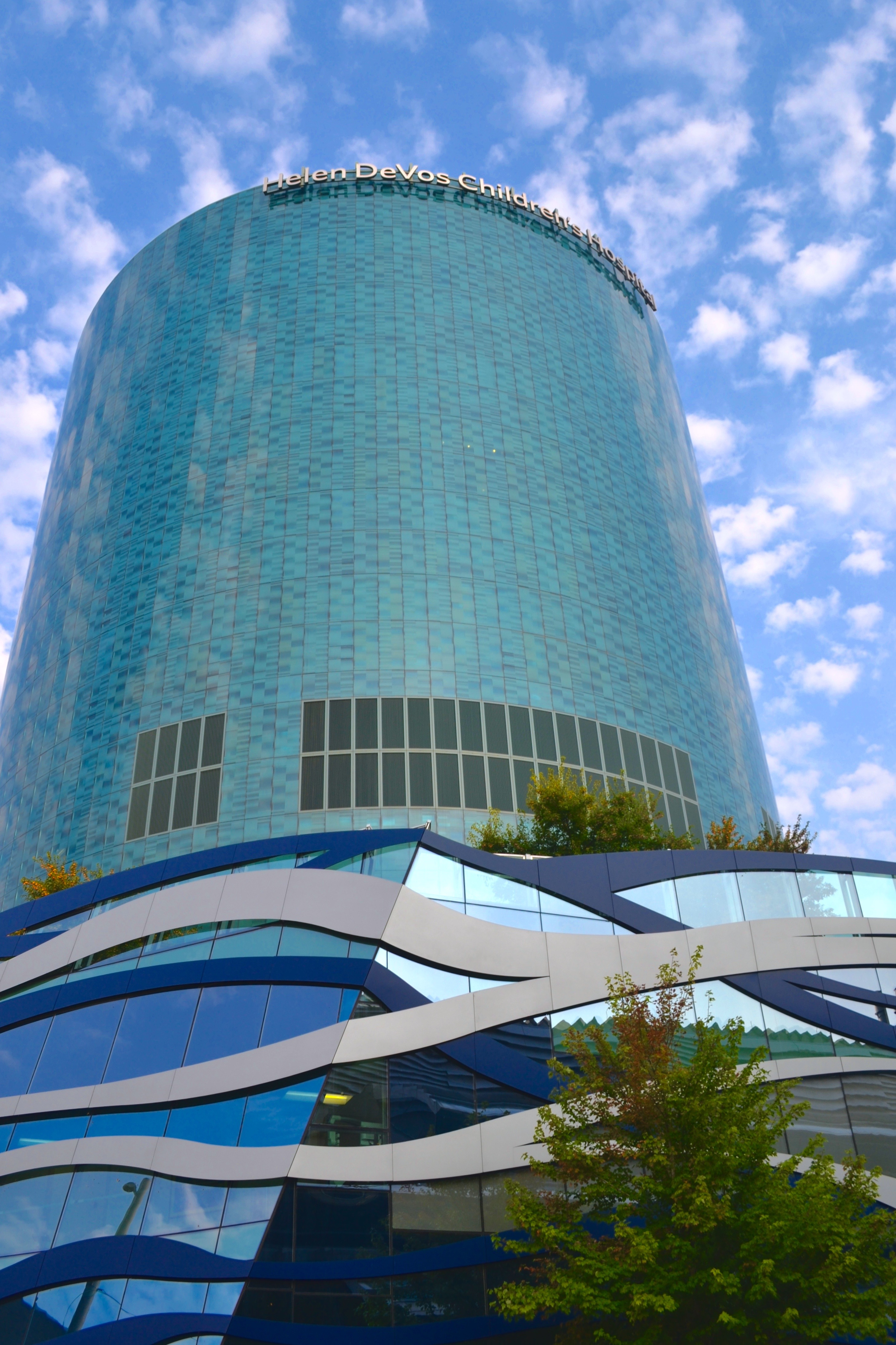
Helen DeVos Children's Hospital, Grand Rapids

Helen June DeVos (née Van Wesep; February 24, 1927 – October 18, 2017) was an American philanthropist and political donor. She was the wife of Richard DeVos, co-founder of Amway beauty and home care products company and owner of the Orlando Magic basketball team. She was the mother-in-law of U.S. Secretary of Education, Betsy DeVos.

== Early life ==
Helen June Van Wesep was born in Grand Rapids, Michigan, on February 24, 1927, to George and Wilma (Burggraaff) Van Wesep. Her family moved to Frankfort, Michigan, when she was a teenager and she graduated from Frankfort High School. She had also attended Grand Rapids Christian School.

She attended Calvin College where she received a degree in education.

== Career ==
She worked as a teacher until she married when she moved to Ada, Michigan.

Helen DeVos was on the board of directors of the Grand Rapids Symphony and the St. Cecelia Music Center.

== Personal life ==
She married Richard DeVos in 1953. They lived next door to Jay van Andel and his wife Betty. Richard and Jay were high school friends who had gone into the Nutrilite sales business together, before starting Amway in 1959.

They had three sons, Dick, Dan, and Doug, and a daughter, Cheri DeVos. All four siblings are active in the family businesses and charities.

== Death ==
Helen DeVos died at her home in Ada Township on October 18, 2017, aged 90, from complications from a stroke following a recent diagnosis of myeloid leukemia.

== Legacy ==
It was reported at the time of her death that the DeVos family had made donations of "more than $1.2 billion over the years". The Richard and Helen DeVos Foundation was a major focus of the DeVos family philanthropy. Helen was especially active in charity to children, education, and music. The Helen DeVos Children's Hospital in Grand Rapids is named after her. Other named buildings include Richard and Helen DeVos Japanese Garden at Frederik Meijer Gardens, the Richard and Helen DeVos Fieldhouse at Hope College as well as the theater there named for her parents, George and Wilma Van Wesep. The Helen DeVos Presidential Scholarship for study of music and the arts was created at Grand Valley State University. The Helen DeVos College of Education at Lee University is named for her.
