= Grand Rapids Christian Schools =

Private school system in Michigan

Coordinates: 42°55′14″N 85°37′21″W

Grand Rapids Christian Schools is a private, Christian school system located in Kent County, Michigan, serving students from pre-kindergarten through 12th grade. The majority of its campuses are situated in Grand Rapids with an additional campus in Rockford. The administrative headquarters of the school system is located adjacent to Grand Rapids Christian High School. As of 2026, Aaron Winkle is the superintendent of the system.

== Finances ==
Circa 2004 the school had a debt of about $20 million, and in 2009 the debt was down to $12.5 million; the school had incurred debt partly due to renovations of the Millbrook school and the construction of the Rockford school. That year Richard DeVos and Helen DeVos gave a donation of $10 million, and the debt was reduced to $2.5 million.

Members of the DeVos family have consistently donated to the school system: the Dick and Betsy DeVos Family Foundation gave the school system $2,390,000 in the years 1999 through 2014. In 2013 members of the DeVos family donated a total of over $6.8 million to the school, including $3.2 million from Doug DeVos, $300,000 from Dick DeVos, and $20,400 from Dan DeVos. In 2017 Erica L. Green of The New York Times wrote "Ms. [Betsy] DeVos is still involved in the school." She added that Betsy DeVos and her husband Dick "are known to be very generous to Grand Rapids Christian High School".

Circa 2013 the system faced an increase in enrollment.

== Operations ==
As of 2009 the school did not use money from tuition to cover debts.

== Demographics ==
As of 2017 racial groups other than non-Hispanic white make up about a quarter the school system's students. Betsy DeVos stated that the Grand Rapids Christian School student body had more ethnic diversity than that of the public schools in Ada Township, Michigan. About 30% of the student body is eligible for school food service at a lower price and/or at no price at all.

The school system gives financial assistance to about 45% of the students.

== Curriculum ==
Students and Grand Rapids Christian study English Language, Science, Mathematics, Social Studies, the Bible, World Languages, Physical Education, Fine Arts, and Technology. The curriculum follows Common Core State Standards, the ACT College Readiness Curriculum, the MI Quality Indicators for Early Learning, and the Michigan Curriculum Framework; and is founded on the Reformed worldview of creation, fall, redemption and restoration.

The religious curriculum focuses on Christianity-related topics, but offers classes and topics about other religions. Students study both the theory of evolution and Creationism.

== Schools ==
The following schools are part of the Grand Rapids Christian Schools system.

- Grand Rapids Christian High School (9-12)
- Grand Rapids Christian Middle School (5-8)
  - In 2013 the middle school had 435 students. In September 2013 Grand Rapids Christian Schools offered to buy the Shawnee Park Math/Science/Technology Academy building for its middle school for $800,000 from Grand Rapids Public Schools. The school, which closed in 2013, was perennially underutilized due to an area preference for religious schools. The district accepted the offer in 2014. The previous middle school facility, also the Evergreen Campus, was built in 1955. DeJonge stated that using a new building would cost less than renovating the existing space for a middle school purpose, and that the new building has more potential uses. The move of the middle school to the current site was scheduled for 2015.
- Rockford Christian School (PreK-8) - Rockford
- Christian Elementary Evergreen Campus (PreK-5)
  - The building it occupies was built in 1955. The middle school was previously co-located; it was scheduled to move out in 2015.
- Christian Elementary Iroquois Campus (PreK-4)

One of the elementary buildings had a cost of $12.5 million.

The system includes the Richard and Helen DeVos Center for Arts and Worship, within the high school facility. It was a result of a donation by Richard DeVos circa 1998. Prior to the center's establishment, the high school students attended chapel at multiple churches because they could not fit in the same church building.

== Notable alumni ==
Multiple members of the DeVos family attended, including:

- Helen DeVos (née Van Wesep)
- Richard DeVos – graduated from the high school in 1944
