= Richard M. DeVos =

Richard M. DeVos may refer to:

- Dick DeVos (Richard Marvin DeVos, Jr., born 1955), businessman and Michigan politician
- Richard DeVos (Richard Marvin DeVos, Sr., 1926–2018), founder of Amway
