= ReFrame Media =

ReFrame Media is an electronic media ministry of the Christian Reformed Church in North America. Started in 1939 as The Back to God Hour, a weekly radio Bible preaching program, it is now under the directorship of Rev. Steven Koster.

== History ==
In 2009, ReFrame Media was formed as a result of the restructuring and expansion of programming of Back to God Ministries International to broadcast dedicated ministries for different languages. It was created to unify all English language programming under a single ministry. Its longest running program, The Back to God Hour, went off the air after 71 years in 2010 and it was immediately replaced by Groundwork, a new weekly radio conversational Bible study broadcast. Since 2011, several new programs have been introduced.

== Current projects ==
ReFrame Media currently produces the following projects:

- Today daily devotional - A daily devotional available in print, email, and mobile app. Today is published bi-monthly, and written by pastors in the Christian Reformed Church.
- Think Christian - A faith and pop culture blog (acquired from Gospel Communications International in 2008).
- Family Fire - A marriage and family ministry providing encouragement to Christian households.
- Kids Corner - A 25-minute, weekly children's radio drama featuring lizard characters.
- Groundwork - A 25-minute, weekly radio conversational Bible study broadcast in association with Words of Hope.
- Church Juice - A service for congregations on church communications, public relations, marketing, and website development.

== Selected former projects ==
ReFrame Media formerly produced the following projects:

- The Back to God Hour
- Primary Focus
- Walk the Way
- Spotlight
- Under the Radar
