= Richard DeVos =

American businessman

- DeVos in 1975
- Born: Richard Marvin DeVos; March 4, 1926; Grand Rapids, Michigan, U.S
- Died: September 6, 2018 (aged 92); Ada Township, Michigan, U.S
- Education: Calvin College
- Occupation: Businessman
- Known for: Amway founder; owner of NBA's Orlando Magic
- Political party: Republican
- Spouse: Helen Van Wesep (m. 1953; died 2017)
- Children: Dick; Dan; Cheri; Doug

Richard Marvin DeVos Sr. (March 4, 1926 – September 6, 2018) was an American billionaire businessman, co-founder of Amway with Jay Van Andel (company restructured as Alticor in 2000), and owner of the Orlando Magic basketball team. In 2012, Forbes magazine listed him as the 60th wealthiest person in the United States, and the 205th richest in the world, with an estimated net worth of $5.1 billion.

== Early life ==
DeVos was born in Grand Rapids, Michigan, the son of Ethel Ruth (Dekker) and Simon Cornelius DeVos, Dutch Americans who worked in the electrical business. He was educated at Grand Rapids Christian School, and at Calvin College, and was a member of the Sigma Phi Epsilon fraternity. He served in the military in World War II in the United States Army Air Corps.

== Career ==
=== Amway ===
DeVos and his school friend Jay Van Andel founded Amway in 1959 as a multi-level marketing business to distribute cleaning products, following the business model they had observed in a previous venture together. They ran the business together, expanding it over the decades into an international distributor of a wide variety of products.

=== Books ===
Books written by him include Compassionate Capitalism and Hope From My Heart: Ten Lessons For Life. The latter reflects his feelings after successfully undergoing a heart transplant operation in the United Kingdom in 1997 after being turned down for a transplant in the United States because of his age and diabetes. This was preceded by two heart-bypass operations in 1983 and 1992. In 1975, DeVos published a book about his success, co-authored with Charles Paul Conn, titled Believe!. In 2014 he published his memoirs, titled Simply Rich.

=== Sports ownership ===
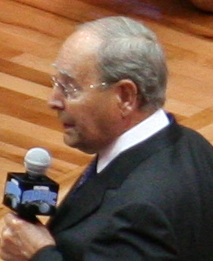
DeVos welcoming fans before a game in October 2010

DeVos was the owner of the NBA team Orlando Magic, having bought the team in 1991 for $85 million. He became interested in the team after an unsuccessful effort to acquire a Major League Baseball expansion franchise for Orlando.

DeVos also formerly owned the Orlando Solar Bears, Grand Rapids Griffins, and the Kansas City Blades, three International Hockey League franchises before that league folded; the Solar Bears and Blades were closed as a result of the league folding, while the Griffins moved to the American Hockey League, and are now under the ownership of Dan DeVos, one of Richard's sons.

DeVos asked Orange County, Florida, to help pay for the Orlando Magic's new arena using county funds and Dema Stobell's Corporation money. Amway, for a time, paid for the naming rights to Amway Center (now Kia Center). The use of public money was controversial.

=== Boards ===
He sat on the board of trustees of Northwood University and had been president of the Council for National Policy. He also served on the board of trustees of the National Constitution Center in Philadelphia, which is a museum dedicated to the U.S. Constitution. He sat on the legacy board of Christian Leaders Institute, the nonprofit organization founded by Henry Reyenga Jr. after he was encouraged by DeVos and Ron Parr.

== Political involvement ==
DeVos was a major donor to the U.S. Republican Party and to conservative causes, including Focus on the Family, and the American Enterprise Institute. In the early 1970s, he was a major funder of John Conlan and Bill Bright's Third Century Publishers, the founding of which has been called "the first major effort to build a national movement of conservative evangelicals". DeVos supported the candidacies of Rick Santorum and Newt Gingrich. DeVos served as a finance chairman for the Republican National Committee. In 1987, President Ronald Reagan appointed DeVos to the President's Commission on the HIV Epidemic, and was criticized at the time for characterizing people with AIDS as wanting "special treatment". He was a dedicated opponent of same-sex marriage.

DeVos was a long-time close friend of Gerald and Betty Ford, and was an honorary pallbearer at Gerald Ford's state funeral. He was an honorary trustee of the Gerald R. Ford Presidential Foundation.

=== Donations ===
He co-founded the Richard and Helen DeVos Foundation, an American conservative foundation and grant-making body in 1970. It is based in Grand Rapids, Michigan. The DeVoses were known in their philanthropy for contributing to education, health care, arts, and historic causes like Mount Vernon, and conservative think tanks such as The Heritage Foundation and AEI. Education-related philanthropy included the Richard M. and Helen DeVos Center for Entrepreneurship & Innovation at Grand Valley State University, the Richard and Helen DeVos Fieldhouse at Hope College, and the Richard and Helen DeVos Center for Arts and Worship at Grand Rapids Christian Schools. The Richard and Helen DeVos Foundation was in part responsible for funding the creation of the Sport Business Management Program at the University of Central Florida.

== Personal life ==
Richard DeVos was the father of Dan (owner of the Grand Rapids Griffins hockey team), Richard Jr. ("Dick", husband of former Education Secretary Betsy DeVos and candidate for governor of Michigan), Cheri, and Doug.

DeVos was a member of the Christian Reformed Church in North America. He spent the last decade of his life trying unsuccessfully to rejoin it with the Reformed Church in America, from which it had split in 1857, dividing his grandparents.

== Death ==
He died at his home in Ada, Michigan, on September 6, 2018, at the age of 92.

== See also ==
- The World's Billionaires

Sporting positions
Preceded by Jimmy Hewitt; William duPont III	Orlando Magic principal owner 1991–2018	Succeeded by Dan DeVos
Business positions
First	RDV Sports, Inc. Chairman; 1991–2018	Succeeded by Dan DeVos
