= Dick DeVos =

American businessman (born 1955)

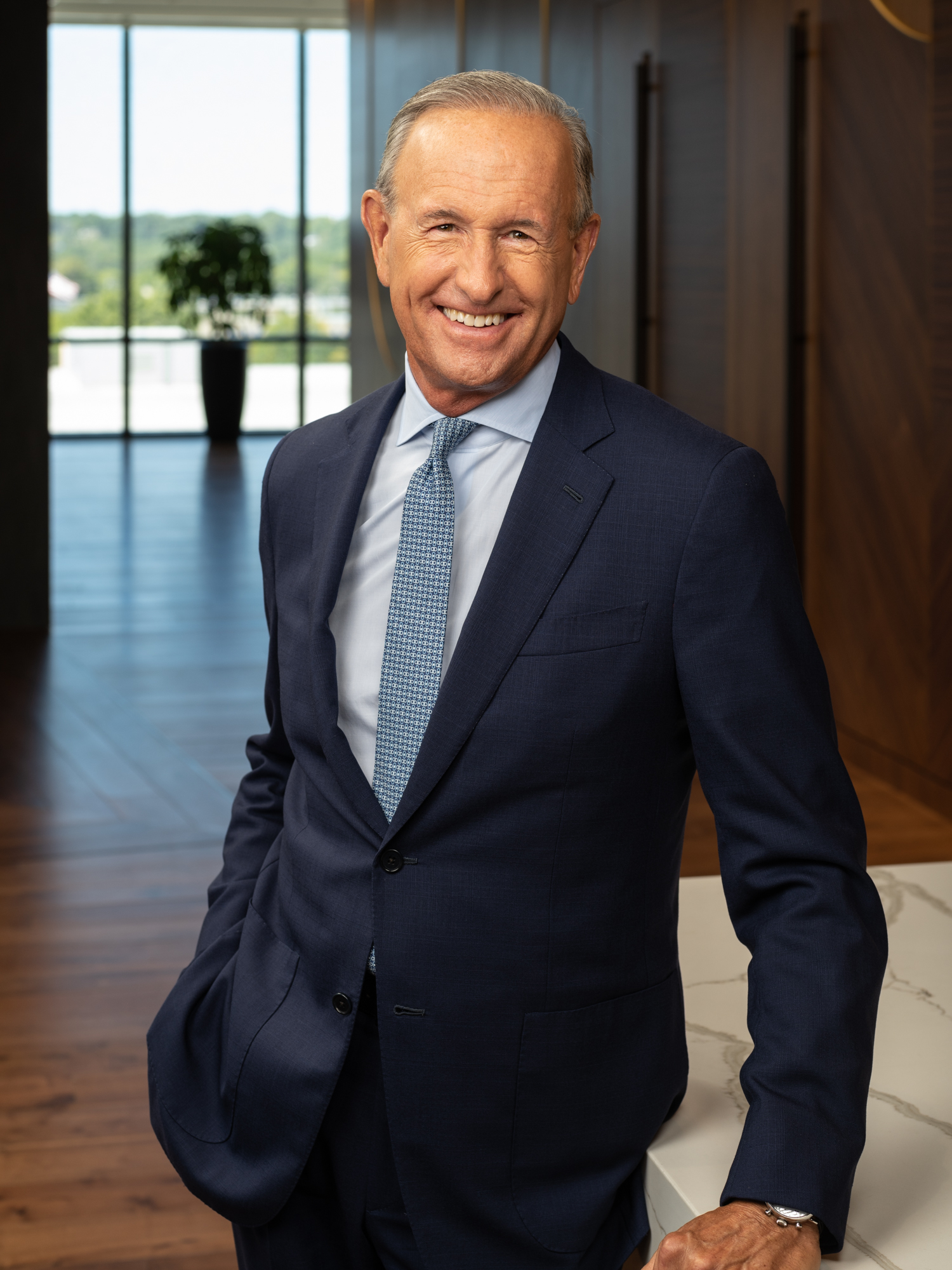
- DeVos in September 2021
- Born: Richard Marvin DeVos Jr. October 21, 1955 (age 71); Grand Rapids, Michigan, U.S.
- Education: Northwood University (BBA)
- Political party: Republican
- Spouse: Betsy Prince (m. 1979)
- Children: 4
- Parent(s): Richard DeVos; Helen DeVos
- Relatives: Dan DeVos (brother); Doug DeVos (brother)
- Website: Official website Foundation website

Richard Marvin DeVos Jr. (/dəˈvɒs/ də-VOSS; born October 21, 1955) is an American businessman, author, and former politician. The son of Amway co-founder Richard DeVos, he was CEO of the multi-level marketing company from 1993 to 2002. In 2006, DeVos ran for Governor of Michigan but lost to the then-incumbent Democrat Jennifer Granholm. In 2012, Forbes magazine listed his father as the No. 351 richest person in the world, with a net worth of approximately US$5.4 billion. DeVos is the husband of Betsy DeVos, the former United States Secretary of Education in the first Trump administration.

== Family and early life ==
DeVos was born in Grand Rapids, Michigan, the son of Helen June (Van Wesep) and Richard Marvin DeVos. His grandparents were Dutch immigrants. DeVos is a graduate of the Forest Hills public school system.

He was involved in the family business, Amway, even as a child. "I still remember when it was in the basement of our home when I was growing up," he later said. "I remember the offices being down there and people working down there." As boys, he and his brother Doug were "tapped as mini-hosts", assigned to greet attendees at Amway's annual conventions, and they "helped out with everything from clearing plates during gatherings to ferrying guests to play tennis or waterski. That evolved to speaking in front of groups and even giving product demonstrations." DeVos later said that "It was kind of like a Junior Achievement atmosphere contained inside of Amway. ... We just hung around the company. It was your social activity."

DeVos received a bachelor's degree in business administration from Northwood University. He later paid to attend, but did not complete, the Harvard Business School and the Wharton School's Executive Study Programs. DeVos has received honorary doctorates from Grove City College, Central Michigan University and Northwood University, as well as distinguished alumni recognition from Northwood University.

His wife, Betsy DeVos, is the former chairperson of the Michigan Republican Party and the former Secretary of Education under President Donald Trump. She is the daughter of billionaire industrialist Edgar Prince, and sister of Blackwater USA founder Erik Prince.

== Business activities ==
=== Amway ===
DeVos began working with Amway Corporation in 1974, holding positions in various divisions, including research and development, manufacturing, marketing, sales, and finance. In 1984, he became one of Amway's vice presidents, with overall responsibility for the company's operations in 18 countries. Under his leadership, the company opened numerous new markets and tripled foreign sales to exceed domestic sales for the first time in company history.

According to one source, "When Dick DeVos became vice president of Amway's foreign operation in 1986, sales outside of the U.S. accounted for about 5 percent of overall sales. When he left the position six years later, they had grown to 50 percent of annual sales."

=== Orlando Magic ===
When the DeVos family acquired the National Basketball Association's Orlando Magic basketball franchise in 1991, DeVos's father, Richard DeVos became president and CEO of the team. On October 21, 2005, it was announced that DeVos would become part owner as his father split ownership evenly between his children.

Larry Guest of the Orlando Sentinel wrote in a September 1991 column that "civic and business leaders in Grand Rapids" considered DeVos "admirable, amicable, compassionate, honorable, community-conscious, intelligent", but that they wondered whether DeVos, who was about to begin running the Orlando Magic, was "strong enough...to make the tough decisions necessary as the chief operating officer overseeing... an NBA franchise?" Guest answered yes, calling DeVos "a business and political specialist experienced far beyond his 35 years on this globe" and noting that he had "recently attracted more than a million votes, more than any other Republican on a statewide basis, to win a seat on Michigan's Board of Education." Guest quoted DeVos as saying that in making business decisions, he hopes "to be seen as tough, but also fair.... I'm not a control-oriented individual, but I expect results and I expect meticulous, detailed management."

=== Amway/Alticor ===
DeVos left his positions as president and CEO of the Orlando Magic in January 1993 to rejoin Amway as its president, succeeding his father, Amway co-founder Rich DeVos. Under Dick Devos, the firm expanded operations to more than 50 countries and territories on six continents.

In 2000, DeVos oversaw a significant corporate restructuring that created Alticor, the new parent company of predecessor Amway, as well as other subsidiary companies. In a 20-month span, Alticor cut over 1,300 jobs (primarily in Michigan) during this restructuring, with 400 of them being buyouts and early retirement. Job cuts were one of several cut backs made during the corporate restructuring of Amway in order to expedite the return to profitability and prevent further downsizing or the possible loss of the company.

DeVos and his brother, Doug DeVos, are "credited with taking the company global, and setting industry standards as they moved into those markets."

DeVos retired as president of Alticor in August 2002. In that fiscal year, Alticor reported sales of $4.5 billion, primarily through its more than 3.5 million part-time sales force and its complementary e-commerce channel. After retiring from Alticor, DeVos returned to become president of The Windquest Group.

== The Windquest Group ==
The Windquest Group is a privately held investment management firm with holdings in technology, manufacturing, and other sectors.

A 2010 article reported on a Windquest venture called The Green Machine, which "converts waste heat that's the byproduct of a manufacturing process – in liquid or gaseous form – into electricity."

DeVos explained that "Some time ago Windquest brought on a specialist in alternative energy. ... We knew this was going to be an important part of our future, but also an opportunity." He explained that sustainability is "not just an environmental concept, it's also an economic one. If a particular business approach is not economically viable it will not be sustainable." Windquest was not interested in "glitzy and glamorous" ideas, he said, but in "technologies that were environmentally sound and economically sustainable" and thus more likely to be widely adopted. He expressed concern "that some of the new products in the marketplace are either too dependent on tax incentives or subsidies" and not genuinely "viable and ...competitive".

The Green Machine is produced by the ElectraTherm Company and distributed by Windquest in collaboration with Pro Services. "It's a three-legged stool", DeVos explained. "ElectraTherm provides the core technology, Pro Services provides the installation ability and the knowledge of the customers' needs and Windquest then provides both financing and high-level business acumen."

== Political activities and activism ==
=== Political activities prior to 2006 ===
In 1990, DeVos won election to the Michigan State Board of Education, and resigned two years into his eight-year term, citing his return to Amway as CEO as the reason. In 1996, DeVos was appointed by Governor John Engler to the Grand Valley State University Board of Control.

=== School vouchers ===
DeVos and his wife became co-chairs of the Education Freedom Fund in 1993. The Fund provides private scholarships to low-income families in Michigan with wishes to attend schools of their choice. When the Children's Scholarship Fund provided $7.5 million to the Education Freedom Fund, the DeVos matched the grant, and their foundation covers all of the administrative costs of the organization.

In 2000, DeVos was the co-chairman of the "Kids First! Yes!" campaign committee, which sponsored a ballot-initiative that would have amended the Michigan constitution to allow vouchers and tuition tax credits for private K-12 education. The initiative lost, with 69% of voters opposing the measure.

The Dick and Betsy DeVos Foundation has also given money to groups like the American Education Reform Council, Choices for Children, and Children First America, in addition to funding Christian schools in the West Michigan area.

== 2006 gubernatorial candidacy ==
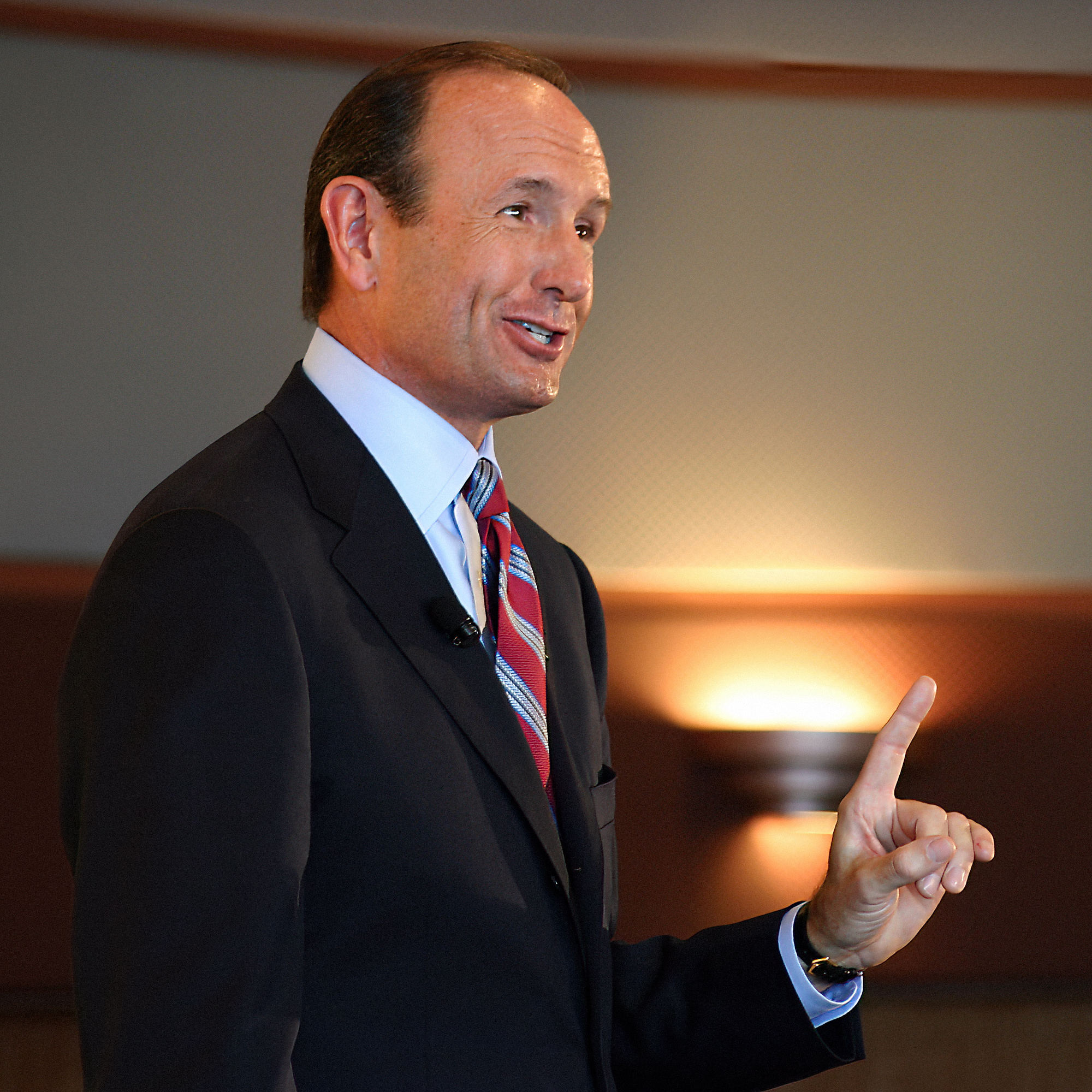
DeVos participating in a jobs forum on October 12 at the Detroit Economic Club

On June 2, 2005, at Mackinac Island, DeVos announced his candidacy for governor of Michigan. He is still considered to be the wealthiest man to run for statewide office in Michigan's history. As of October 27, 2006, the DeVos campaign had spent $39 million, of which nearly $35 million was DeVos's own money.

An article published on August 3, 2005, quoted DeVos as saying that the main issue for Michigan voters was the state's economy. "We're fighting with Mississippi for the highest unemployment rate in the country. We have the lowest personal income growth, the lowest business start-ups in the country. We are the only state that has not moved to positive ground when it comes to actual numbers of jobs in the marketplace," he said. He also suggested that tourism "is one of the businesses and industries that has a bright future for Michigan, and is exciting." Criticizing Granholm's economic policies, he said that in her place "I would have sent a very different signal to the entire regulatory infrastructure of the state, and would have taken steps to make this state more business friendly." Granholm, he said, "has talked about wanting business, but all of her actions and the actions of all the regulatory agencies and government agencies in this state have continued to create difficulties for business. I hear it from business people everywhere I go in this state."

In an interview given during the campaign, DeVos said: "It's all about jobs. Jobs are the number one issue in Michigan right now. Our state does not have a climate for job creation. Job-killing taxes like the SBT (Single Business Tax) punish job makers for creating jobs, providing their employees with benefits, and investing in new technology. Taxes like the SBT and Michigan's personal property tax hurt manufacturers more than any other tax. They've got to go if we want to help manufacturing and bring jobs back to Michigan." He also spoke of the need to "work on trade issues to make sure that Detroit's automakers can compete fairly both here in the United States and around the world."

Thomas Bray of RealClearPolitics reported on June 21, 2006, that incumbent Jennifer Granholm was "in deep trouble," with DeVos surging "to a 48–40 lead...in a Detroit News/WXYZ-TV poll." In other polls, the two candidates were "in a dead heat," and, to some observers' surprise, DeVos was leading "48–40 among union households." Bray's conclusion was that "the DeVos ads are striking home with their message: that the Michigan economy is in a shambles, that Granholm has failed to develop a strategy to resurrect the state and that a hard-nosed businessman who owes nothing to anybody is just the guy to sort things out."

An October 2006 article in Human Events argued that the Michigan governor's race was "shaping up as a classic style vs. substance confrontation," with Granholm, "a charismatic and attractive former aspiring actress who can deliver a speech and charm a crowd with the best of them," representing style, and DeVos representing substance. While lacking Granholm's "flashier qualities," DeVos's "business background...ideally suits him to address the state's most vexing economic issues." The article noted that DeVos was interested in job creation in what was "perhaps the least business-friendly state in the country." While Granholm argued that jobs had been moved to China and India, DeVos pointed out that "Michigan jobs have...gone to Ohio, Indiana, and other states with less punitive tax policies, and this governor fails to recognize that."

A November 3, 2006, article noted that DeVos's plan for turning around Michigan's "economic stagnancy and increasing unemployment" was called the TurnAround Plan. It called for action on four fronts: "creating an attractive job climate, overhauling state government, diversifying the economy, and conquering the international marketplace." DeVos planned to create "a pro-jobs tax structure while supporting small business growth to increase jobs," and described his credentials as follows: "I've made tough decisions, I've turned around a struggling business, and I've helped an entire city turn around."

He also called for an increase in "funding for secondary and higher education," for a streamlined health-care system "that utilizes technology to reduce hospital errors by making medical records more efficient," and for " strong anti-crime measures, specifically against child predators." The article noted that debates between DeVos and Granholm had "done little to help either's cause, though they did have an effect on the polls," with support for both candidates dropping and the number of undecided voters increasing. "Whether it has been Granholm's campaign morphing images of DeVos into President Bush, or DeVos's ads including compromising footage of the governor's speeches, neither candidate has found a way to gain an advantage."

The article also pointed out that "newspapers have divided their support along party lines, with the Detroit Free Press endorsing Granholm and The Grand Rapids Press siding with DeVos." Among DeVos's supporters was Lee Iacocca, who had been actively campaigning for him. He had also received endorsements from the Michigan Chamber of Commerce and the Michigan Farm Bureau.

On November 7, 2006, DeVos was defeated by Democratic incumbent Jennifer Granholm by a 14-point margin. He congratulated the re-elected Granholm via phone after the results were in. Granholm was quoted as saying she "admired his tenacity and his passion for Michigan".

According to a CBS reporter, DeVos's loss was widely attributed to his performance in his first televised debate with Granholm. "Granholm went for the jugular talking about an investment he had in a nursing home," and "DeVos's lackluster response opened the door that led to his eventual loss." Years later, DeVos said: "I learned I needed to be better at expressing my opinions more directly and forcefully....My mother taught me to be respectful and polite, but sometimes I took that advice too far."

=== Post-2006 political activity ===
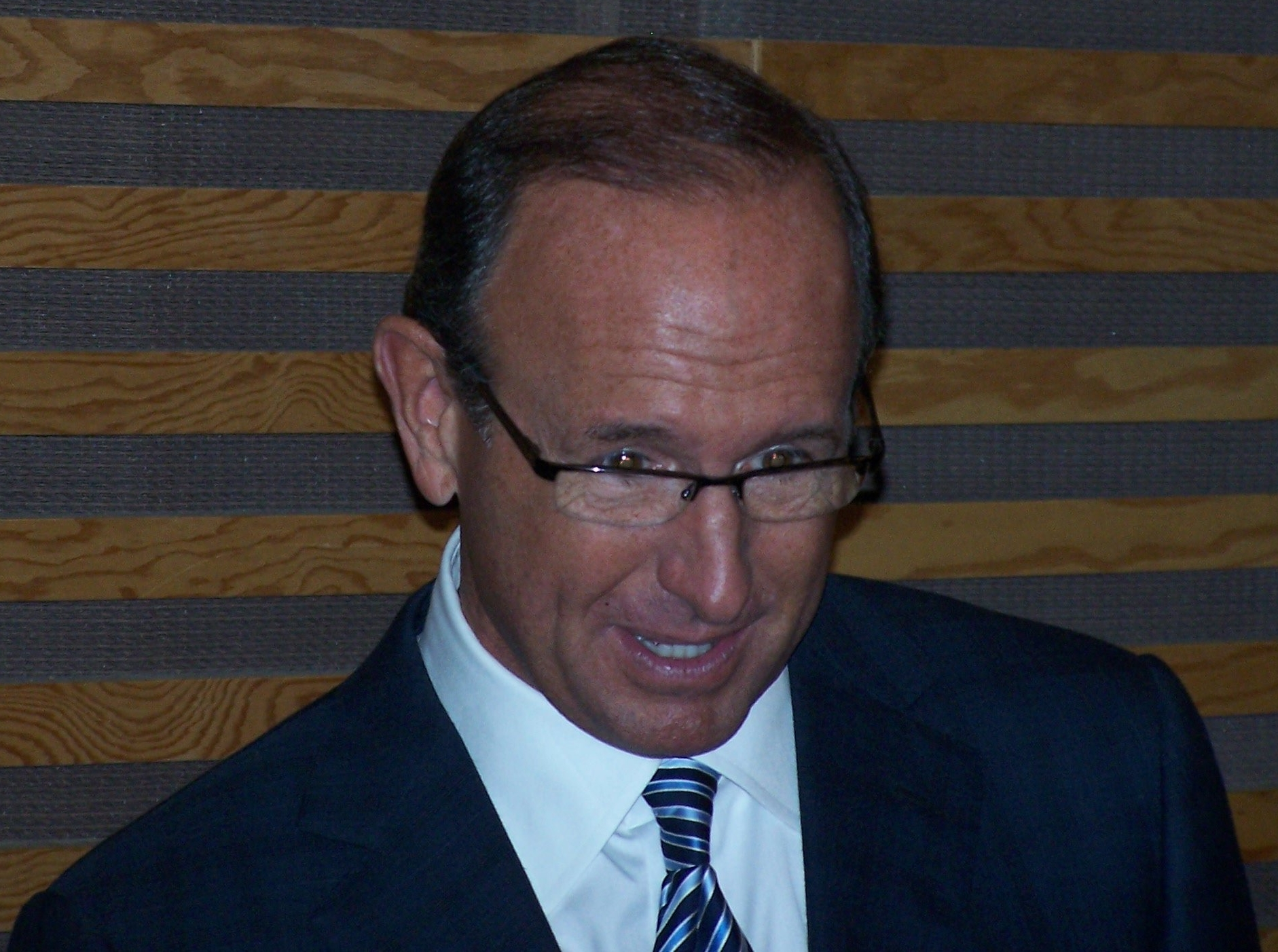
DeVos speaking in 2010

In October 2008, DeVos donated $200,000 to the PAC opposing Michigan State Proposal – 08-2 (2008). He is a major backer of the America First Action PAC.

== Right to work ==
In October 2012, DeVos engaged in a series of public debates with Teamsters president James Hoffa, son of that union's legendary leader Jimmy Hoffa. They argued about the role of unions, with DeVos taking the position that "Workers and job creators, through hard work, ingenuity, sweat and risk-taking, literally made the strongest economy in the world and the greatest standard of living in history...The greatest generation...did not just win a World War, they labored shoulder-to-shoulder with fellow workers to create and sustain value-added enterprises." By contrast, "big union bosses have engaged in cozy deals and political backroom dealings in order to advance their personal agendas, not those of their members," They focused especially on Michigan's Proposition 2, which would protect collective bargaining. "The unintended consequences of Proposal 2 will result in a $1.6-billion annual tax hike," said DeVos. "Since collective bargaining is a federally protected right, Proposal 2 is really about special interests."

In a December 2012 article in The New York Times, Nicholas Confessore and Monica Davey reported that after President Obama's re-election, DeVos "began dialing up state lawmakers in Lansing," telling them that it was time to pass a right-to-work law. "If the lawmakers later found themselves facing recalls or tough re-election fights, Mr. DeVos told them, he would be there to help."

The legislators and Republican governor Rick Snyder "rapidly approved the legislation and delivered a body blow to the labor movement." The Times article noted that the Devos family had given over $1 million to the Michigan GOP in 2012 and at least $2 million to a successful effort to defeat a proposal for a pro-union constitutional amendment. After that defeat, the DeVos family helped form the Michigan Freedom Fund to promote a right-to-work law.

A Reuters article published in December 2012 noted that the Michigan right-to-work campaign had "gathered momentum" thanks to the involvement of DeVos and "Ronald Weiser, former chairman of the Michigan Republican Party and ambassador to Slovakia under President George W. Bush...The wealthy businessman and the political guru both worked to persuade wavering Republican lawmakers by assuring them they would have financial support if they faced recall elections over right-to-work, as happened in Wisconsin."

In a talk given in Washington, D.C., in January 2013, under the auspices of The Heritage Foundation, DeVos discussed the passage of so-called "Right to Work" legislation in Michigan. "Freedom to Work was simply the right thing to do," he said. "By casting off the practice of forced unionization; Michigan now publicly declares to other states and in fact the world, that we embrace freedom for our workers, true equality in the workplace and that we are ready to compete with anyone, anywhere to create economic opportunity for our Michigan families." In his talk, he explained how the legislation was passed, praising Michigan's business community, certain legislators, and Mackinac Center for Public Policy for their role in its passage, and noting that it was important to propose the legislation at the right time, to give it the right name, to be prepared for backlash, and to bring it to a vote quickly.

MSNBC reported in December 2012 that the Mackinac Public Policy Center, which had played a major role in the passage of right-to-work in Michigan, was funded mainly by the Charles G. Koch Foundation and the Dick and Betsy DeVos Foundation. Despite the national fame of the Koch brothers, noted MSNBC, "among Michigan power brokers, DeVos might well be the bigger name." Since losing his 2006 run for governor, he had "worked to exert influence from the outside."

== Philanthropy ==
=== Foundation activity ===
Dick DeVos is President of the Dick and Betsy DeVos Foundation, a Grand Rapids-area foundation that has donated millions of dollars to civic, artistic, religious, educational, community and free-market economic organizations since 1990. Among its grantees are Kids Hope USA; the Helen DeVos Children's Hospital; the West Michigan Aviation Academy; Mars Hill Bible Church; Potter's House; Grand Rapids Christian Schools; the Thunderbird School of Global Management; ArtPrize Grand Rapids; Rehoboth Christian School; Calvin College; Princeton University; Davenport University; Grove City College; and Hope College.

In the fall of 2010, DeVos opened the West Michigan Aviation Academy, the nation's first aviation public charter high school.

A March 2010 article reported that the idea for the school had been Betsy DeVos's. "DeVos said she was thinking about the couple's interest in education and her husband Dick's love of flying. 'I said, "Why don't you combine both of these passions—a passion for education, for kids and a passion for flying—in a school."'" The academy is located on the grounds of the Gerald R. Ford International Airport. "There are aviators all over this community," Dick DeVos told a reporter. "It's fascinating how many aviators there are who have already expressed a desire to be involved with this program and to bring the aviation component to it. That is going to be a big job to weave aviation throughout the entire basic curriculum. We've made a commitment to do that."

In answer to the question of why it was a charter school, DeVos explained that "Charter schools are available to everyone.... A charter school is a public school and therefore there's no tuition. So every student would have the possibility of going to this school at no cost and we think that's very, very important—to reach across the entire West Michigan community to be sure that every child has an opportunity to attend this school." He added that "This is the kind of school that I would have loved to have had if I was a kid." He told a reporter for the Grand Rapids Press: "If you're the kind of person who can't help but look up when you hear a plane overhead, then you're exactly the kind of person who will love this school....I have just a joy of flying....The world is such a different place when you can see it from 5,000 feet. I want young people to experience something that might broaden their world."

=== Arts funding ===
The Dick and Betsy DeVos Foundation has supported ArtPrize, an art competition in Grand Rapids, since 2009.

In 2010 Betsy and Dick DeVos committed $22.5 million to the Kennedy Center Institute of Arts Management, which was thereupon renamed the DeVos Institute of Arts Management at the Kennedy Center. It offers "practical training to arts managers and board members on stages of professional development in the United States and around the world"; its centerpiece is the "Capacity Building programs, which offer technical assistance to arts managers and their boards through seminars, web chats, and on-site consultations." The gift was the largest private donation in the Kennedy Center's history and part was to be spent on arts groups in Michigan hit hard by the recession.

=== Free-market economics ===
The foundation has also given money to organizations that promote free-market economics, such as the Grand Rapids-based Acton Institute, The Heritage Foundation, and the Hudson Institute. The DeVos family also has contributed to Northwood University in Midland, Michigan, including donations for scholarships, buildings, and other financial donations.

=== Scholarships ===
The Dick & Betsy DeVos Scholarship was established in 2008 by DeVos and his wife to support entering MA, MS, or MBA students at the Thunderbird School of Global Management, particularly those from developing nations.

The DeVoses have also established an annual scholarship, called the Betsy and Dick DeVos Scholars for Free Enterprise and Entrepreneurship Scholarship, which is awarded to students who wish to earn a BBA or combined BBA/MBA at Northwood University.

=== Grand action ===
An account of the Grand Action project explains that while authorities in Detroit kept initiating "one master project after another" that was supposed to solve that city's problems, and that never did, Grand Rapids was different, because its "business leaders painstakingly set goals, aligned with government officials, generated support, and empowered key players." DeVos was at the center of this effort. In 1991, he "convened a group of more than 50 community and civic leaders to begin the process of revitalizing downtown" under the name of Grand Vision, later Grand Action.

Plans were made "for an entertainment and sports arena and the expansion of local convention facilities." After conducting "a feasibility and economic-impact analysis," DeVos worked with two local bankers to set the plan in motion. Among the fruits of this effort were a new sports arena, a new convention center, a new J.W. Marriott Hotel, the renovation of the Civic Theater (renamed the Meijer Majestic Theater), a new art museum, and a new civic gardens and sculpture park, two new satellite campuses for Grand Valley State University, and a new institute for biomedical research. "It's this kind of planning, a continual reinvention with clear goals," wrote a CNN journalist, "that has been lacking in Detroit."

=== Pollution study ===
DeVos and his wife contributed money to help fund a $500,000, 18-month private study of Lake Macatawa pollution sources, according to a June 2011 article. The study would "use DNA fingerprinting technology pioneered recently at Michigan State University to identify specific sources of E. coli in different areas of the lake. A second part of the study will look at sources of sediment and the contaminants it carries." "We are fortunate to have skilled scientists, committed conservationists and highly qualified academicians in West Michigan addressing this problem," DeVos told the Sentinel. "Threats to water quality are threats to public health and safety, and the people of Holland cannot afford to wait until 2017 for action."

== Rediscovering American Values ==
DeVos is the author of the 1998 book Rediscovering American Values. Published by E.P. Dutton, it contains a foreword by former President Gerald R. Ford. Publishers Weekly described it as follows: "Drawing on inspirational anecdotes taken from a cross section of the population, he describes how people have bettered themselves both morally and in their careers by practicing such values as honesty, compassion, self-discipline, initiative, hard work, charity and forgiveness. An unrelenting optimist, DeVos is convinced that people can solve most of their problems by taking personal responsibility." The book was a New York Times best seller.

== Honors and awards ==
In September 2010, the Spectrum Health Foundation presented DeVos with its Art of Giving Award at its annual celebration of philanthropy.

== Current posts and board memberships ==
- President, the Windquest Group
- Chairman, Board of Directors, Spectrum Health System, 2010 – present
- Member, Board of Trustees, Health Care Foundation; 1990–2010 (Chairman, 1994–2010)
- Member, Board of Directors, Michigan State Chamber of Commerce, 2010 – present
- Member, Board of Directors, The Stow Company of Michigan
- Founder and Chairman, West Michigan Aviation Academy (a charter high school), 2010 – present
- Chairman, Board of Directors, RDV Corporation
- Governing Board, Orlando Magic, 1994–present
- Member, Board of Trustees, Thunderbird School of Global Management, 2003–present
- Member, Board of Directors, Willow Creek Association, 1997–present
- Co-Chairman, Grand Action Committee, 1992–present (Chairman, Grand Vision Committee, 1991–1992)
- Founder and Chairman, Regional Air Alliance of West Michigan, 2010–present
- Member, FAA Management Advisory Council, September 2017–present.

== Personal life ==
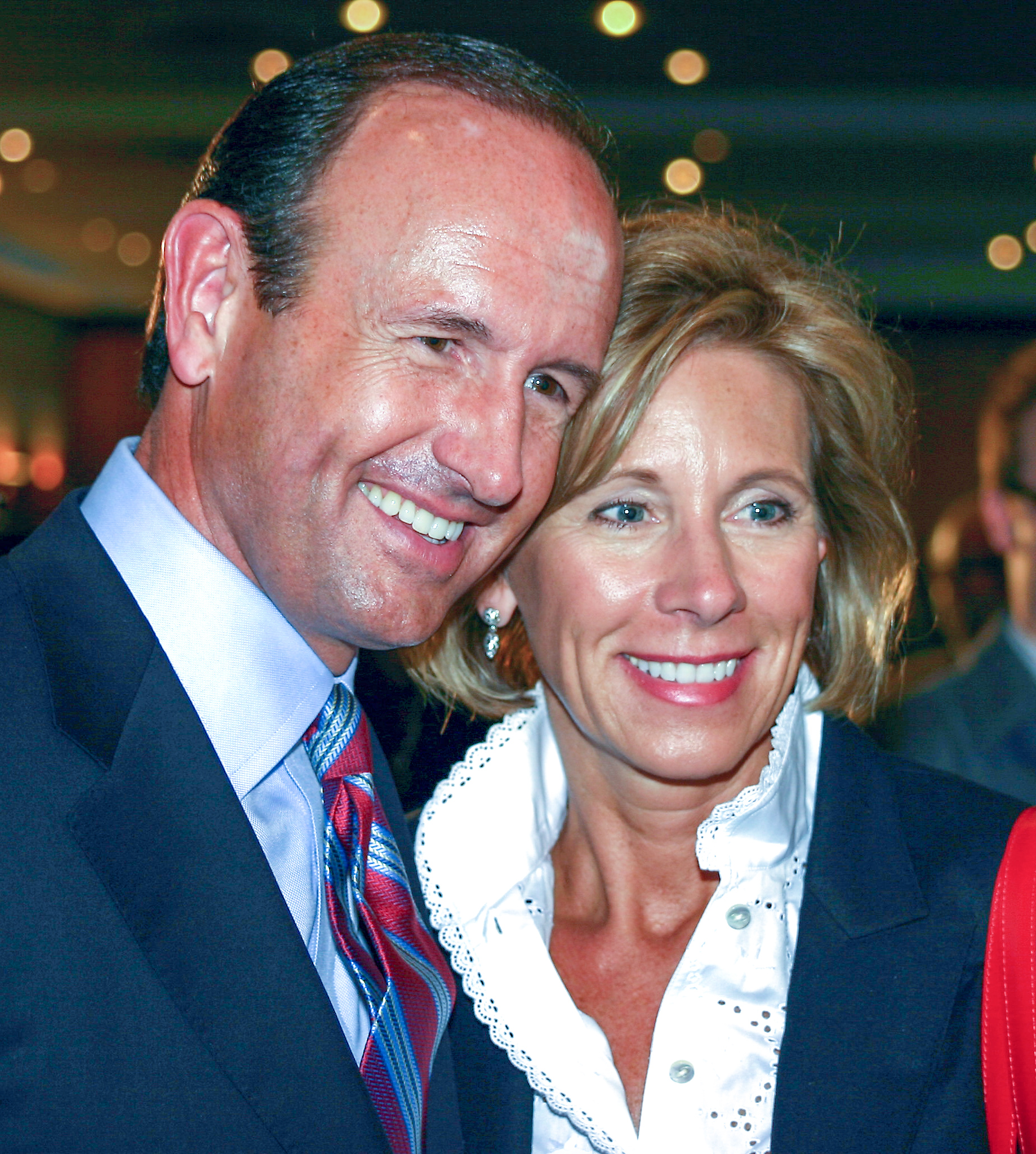
DeVos and his wife, Betsy, in 2006

DeVos and his wife have four children: Richard Marvin (Rick) III, Elisabeth (Elissa), Andrea, and Ryan, and eight grandchildren. Their son, Rick, is the founder and chairman of ArtPrize, a world-renowned art competition in Grand Rapids, Michigan.

DeVos and his wife have homes in Grand Rapids and Ada, Michigan. They also own three houses in Windsor, Florida, a development at the northern end of Vero Beach, 80 miles north of Palm Beach. They bought a lot there in 1997 and bought another one later. They now have a compound consisting of two houses, plus another house elsewhere in Windsor, where they spend several weeks a year. In addition, they have a vacation home in Holland, Michigan, on the shore of Lake Macatawa. DeVos bought the property from his father in 2009.

Party political offices
Preceded by Dick Posthumus	Republican nominee for Governor of Michigan; 2006	Succeeded by Rick Snyder
