= ReFrame Ministries =

Electronic media ministry of the Christian Reformed Church

- Founded: December 17, 1939
- Founder: Revs. Dick Walters, Edward Pekelder, Benjamin Essenburg, and Henry Baker; Messrs. Jacob De Jager and Mark Fakkema, under the direction of the Christian Reformed Church
- Type: Electronic Media Ministry
- Tax ID no.: 362284261
- Purpose: Electronic Media
- Location: Grand Rapids, Michigan
- Coordinates: 41.672408°N 87.782206°W
- Origins: The Back to God Hour
- Region served: Worldwide
- Method: Radio, Television, Internet
- Owner: Christian Reformed Church in North America
- Key people: Executive Director Rev. Kurt Selles
- Revenue: $9,506,199
- Employees: 29
- Website: reframeministries.org
- Formerly called: The Back to God Hour

ReFrame Ministries (formerly Back to God Ministries International) is the electronic media ministry of the Christian Reformed Church. Founded in 1939 as the weekly radio ministry program The Back to God Hour, in 2015 the organization produces radio programs, TV broadcasts, and Internet websites in 10 languages, including children's dramas, daily devotionals, Bible resources, family resources, and cultural reflections. It operates from the Christian Reformed Church Headquarters in Grand Rapids, Michigan, and in Burlington, Ontario.

== History ==
=== Planning ===
At the Christian Reformed Synod of 1928, a committee was appointed to investigate the possibilities for radio missions. The committee presented a report for Synod of 1930 detailing plans for broadcasting sermons, but because of financial difficulties created by the stock market crash of 1929 the plan was shelved.

In 1938, Synod received a request from Classis Pella (a regional assembly in Iowa) to develop a denominational broadcast modeled after The Lutheran Hour. Synod then appointed the first permanent Radio Committee.

=== The Back to God Hour ===
On Sunday, December 17, 1939, the first broadcast was aired over WJJD, a 20,000-watt station in Chicago. Calvin College Professor Henry Schultze served as the first speaker. During the first three seasons, the program was not produced during the summer; beginning in the 1943-44 season, the program was aired every Sunday, year-round.

At this time Dr. Peter Eldersveld joined the organization, first as an introductory announcer and later as a regular host. In 1946 the Church appointed him as a full-time radio minister. In 1950 he launched The Family Altar (later renamed the Today daily devotional), a booklet with daily devotional messages which was promoted through the radio program.

In 1956 the Back to God Hour was syndicated on HCJB, a short-wave broadcasting station in Ecuador, its first continuous international broadcast. In 1958, 13 episodes of the Back to God Hour were filmed for television.

In 1958, the Back to God Hour began broadcasting in the Middle East, with Rev. Bassam Madany as Arabic minister. The Back to God Hour expanded in 1959 to Australia and New Zealand. In 1961, Rev. Juan Boonstra began translating programming into Spanish, and in 1965 he moved to Chicago to record programs for Latin American audiences as the Spanish language minister,

=== Expansion ===
After Eldersveld's death in 1965, Dr. Joel Nederhood was appointed as his replacement. Over the next few years, the organization expanded its broadcasts into more languages, including Indonesian, French, and Portuguese. Many of the broadcasts were sent out through Trans World Radio (TWR), a Christian radio broadcasting organization with transmitting stations around the world.

In 1974, Chinese and Japanese ministries were set up. In 1976, Back to God built a new International Communications Center in Palos Heights, Illinois, with office space as well as radio and television production facilities. In 1977, Back to God began producing television programs: documentaries, holiday specials, and Faith 20, a 30-minute video version of The Back to God Hour radio program which aired daily across the United States.

In 1980, Russian language broadcasts began under the leadership of Mikhail Morgulis. In 1981, WGN America offered a daily morning time slot for Faith 20. Telephone counseling centers were set up in Chicago, Los Angeles, New York City, and Toronto. In Brazil, Rev. Ferreira created Disquepaz, a short Portuguese language devotional program delivered by telephone. In 1982, the French language ministry was moved from Paris to Chicago.

By 1990, Dr. Nederhood's duties as Director had expanded, and a separate minister, Rev. David Feddes, took over as host of the English language version of The Back to God Hour. Rev. Feddes left Back to God Ministries in 2008 and became the provost of Christian Leaders Institute.

In January 1996, Nederhood retired and Dr. Calvin Bremer was appointed to replace him as Director of Ministries. Over the next few years, Several other ministers retired and were replaced by younger preachers. Back to God also opened new offices in Moscow in 1995 (relocated to St. Petersburg in 2004,) and in Hong Kong in 2005.

In 1997, Faith 20 was discontinued. Bremer began a new program, entitled Primary Focus in 1999. In 2000, Back to God debuted a children's radio program called Kids Corner. Primary Focus ran for 6 years, and was nominated for two local Chicago Emmy Awards. In 2005, Back to God ended Primary Focus as part of its move toward a more Internet-based ministry.

In 2005 Bremer resigned as Director of Ministries after admitting to behaving with poor judgement in a conflict of interest situation, and Rev. Robert Heerspink replaced him as the organization's leader. In 2006, Back to God reorganized the English language ministry, bringing the Today devotional, Back to God Hour, and Kids Corner under the leadership of Rev. Steven Koster. Back to God also entered a partnership with Words of Hope and FEBA to produce a Specialized English broadcast called Spotlight.

=== Back to God Ministries International ===
In 2008, the organization changed its name from "The Back to God Hour" to "Back to God Ministries International" because its activities had extended beyond overseeing the radio program of the same name. Also in 2008, A new daily radio program called Walk the Way, with an associated videoblog, began to air, a new radio program called Under the Radar was launched, and the blog Think Christian was acquired from Gospel Communications International.

In 2009, the English ministry was reorganized as ReFrame Media, unifying all domestic programming into a single ministry. In 2010, the long-running Back to God Hour celebrated its 75th anniversary and was replaced by a new program called Groundwork, which was produced in partnership with Words of Hope. 2010 also saw the launch of Family Fire a family encouragement ministry.

After Heerspink's death in 2011, Rev. Kurt Selles, formerly a missionary in China and Taiwan, became the organization's Director in 2012.

In 2015, the Christian Reformed Church Synod announced plans to combine the governing boards of Back to God Ministries International with two other missionary organizations within the church, Christian Reformed World Missions and Christian Reformed Home Missions.

In December 2017, the property at 6555 West College Drive in Palos Heights, Illinois, where Back to God Ministries International was based for more than 40 years, was sold to adjacent Trinity Christian College. The sale marked the relocation of Back to God Ministries International to Grand Rapids, Michigan.

In 2021, the ministry changed names to ReFrame Ministries, building on the recognition of the English Ministry's name and unifying the branding between the English and non-English programs.

=== English ministries ===
The English language ministry of ReFrame Ministries is under the co-directorship of Robin Basselin and Justin Sterenberg after Rev. Steven Koster stepped down in July 2019. Some of its current projects are:

- Today daily devotional - A daily devotional in print and email. Today booklets are published bi-monthly, and is written by pastors in the Christian Reformed Church.
- Think Christian - A faith and culture blog (acquired from Gospel Communications International in 2008).
- Family Fire - A marriage and family ministry providing encouragement to Christian households.
- Kid's Corner - A 25-minute weekly children's radio drama starring lizard characters.
- Groundwork - A 25-minute weekly radio conversational Bible study broadcast.
- Church Juice - A service for congregations on church communications, public relations, marketing, and website development.

Some of its former projects include

- Under the Radar - A 60-minute weekly radio program that plays "undiscovered" and "under-appreciated" music. Was spun off as an independent ministry in 2014, then relaunched again in 2017 as UTR Media.
- Walk the Way - A weekly 5-minute videoblog hosted by Rev. Jeff Klein. Was transferred to QPlace in 2014.
- Spotlight - A weekly 15-minute radio program recorded in Specialized English, produced in association with Words of Hope and HCJB Global. ReFrame withdrew from the project in 2014.
- Primary Focus - a 30-minute TV broadcast of encouraging and inspirational faith stories. Was spun off as the independent "Life Focus" in 2005.
- Faith20 - A TV devotional program, discontinued in 1997.
- The Family Altar - the original name of the Today devotional, beginning in 1950.
- The Back to God Hour - The original preaching program ran from 1939-2010, and was renamed Groundwork.

=== French ===
Led by Rev. Paul Mpindi from 1999-2014. Its projects include:

- Perspective Réformées - ("Reformed Perspective") Daily 15-minute radio program designed to reach those who wish to become Christians.
- Perspective Réformées pour la femme Chretienne - ("Reformed Perspective for the Christian Woman") - Weekly 15-minute radio program aimed at women.
- Pain de Vie - ("Bread of Life") The French version of the daily devotional booklet Today
- Cours Bibliques Par Correspondances - ("Bible Correspondence Courses'")

=== Spanish ===
Rev. Huascar de la Cruz has been the director of the Spanish language Ministry since 2019. His group provides free technical training for radio station personnel in Latin America in exchange for airtime. Back to God's Spanish projects include:

- La Hora de la Reforma - ("The Hour of Reformation") A 15-minute weekly radio introduction to biblical teachings.
- El Club del Arca - ("'The Ark Clubhouse") A 52 episodes bible-oriented children's television show with puppet characters.
- Reflexión - ("Reflections") a 5-minute daily radio commentary with a Christian perspective.
- Comunicadores Online - ("Online Communications") a website which offers follow-up resources and communication for station managers and media technicians who attend Back to God Ministries International training workshops.
- La Vida Ahora ("Life Today") a weekly news magazine video broadcast, DVD and podcast concerned with applying biblical principles to daily life situations.

=== Other languages ===
ReFrame Ministries has supported broadcasts in Chinese since 1990, Russian since 1996, Japanese since 1998, Portuguese since 2006, Hindi since 2014, and Arabic and Indonesia both since 2019.
