= Grand Rapids Christian High School =

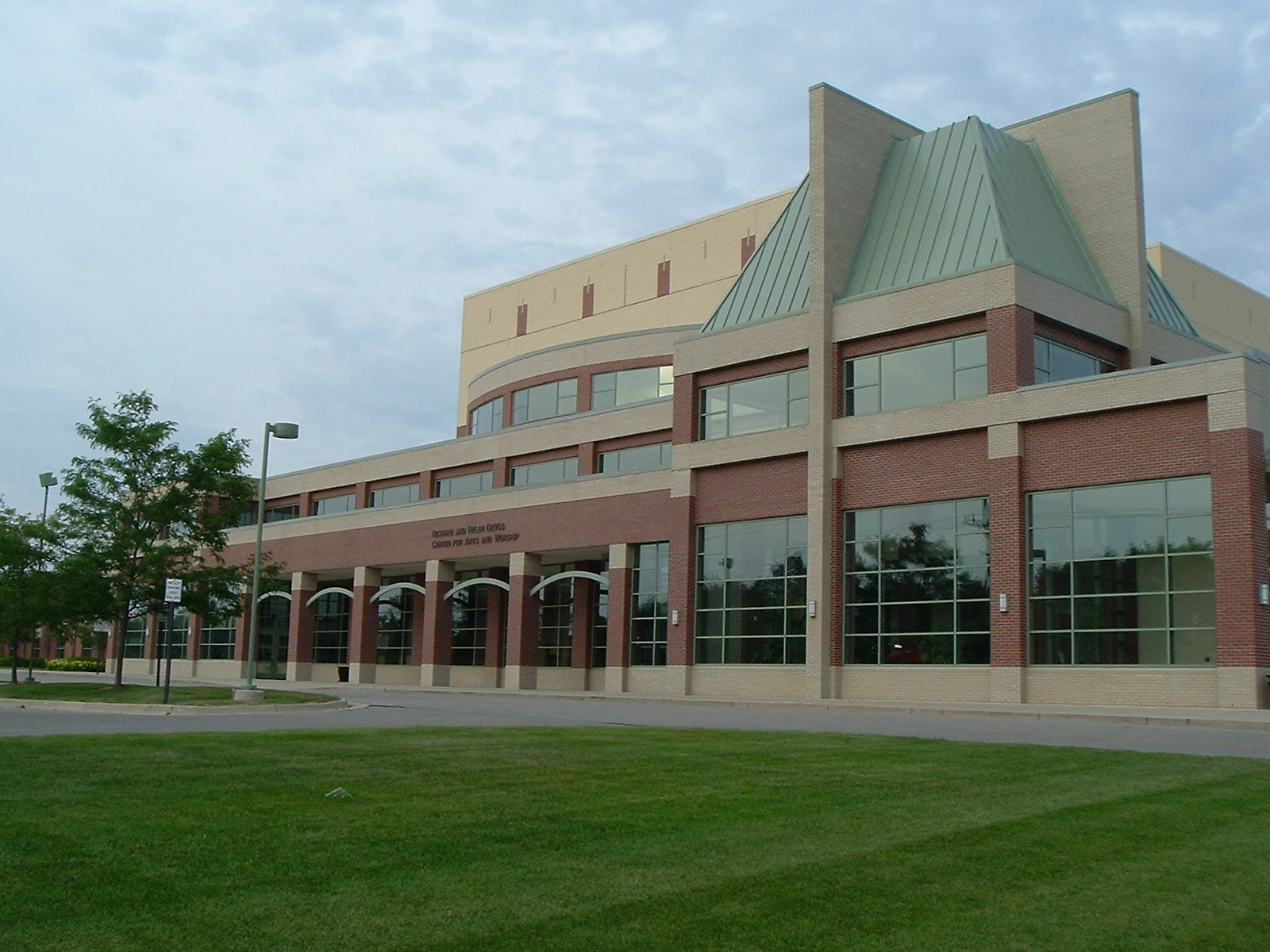

Location
- 2300 Plymouth Avenue, S.E. Grand Rapids, Kent County, Michigan 49506; United States; 42°55′16″N 85°37′19″W

Information
- School type: Private Christian
- Motto: Preparing students to be effective servants of Christ in contemporary society.
- Founded: 1920
- Superintendent: Aaron Winkle
- Principal: Brad Mockabee
- Teaching staff: 52.0 (on an FTE basis)
- Grades: 9–12
- Enrollment: 752 (2023–2024)
- Student to teacher ratio: 14.5
- Language: English
- Colors: Columbia blue (Pantone 292) and black
- Team name: Eagles
- Website: www.grcs.org/academics/schools/grchs

Grand Rapids Christian High School (GRCHS) is a private Christian secondary school in Grand Rapids, Michigan. Founded in 1920, "Christian High" is a member of Grand Rapids Christian Schools and Christian Schools International. The school was first accredited by the North Central Association of Colleges and Schools in 1925, one of the first six high schools in Kent County to receive that honor. GRCHS is also a member of the Michigan Association of Non-public Schools.

== Notable alumni ==
- Justin Amash, former United States Representative of Michigan's 3rd congressional district
- Kobe Bufkin, first-round pick in 2023 NBA draft
- Richard DeVos and Jay Van Andel, co-founders of Amway
- Kavon Frazier, former NFL American football player
- William Post, co-creator of Pop-Tarts
- Paul Schrader, director and screenwriter
- Xavier Tillman, NBA basketball player
- Duane Washington Jr, NBA basketball player
