= West Michigan Aviation Academy =

Public aviation charter high school in Grand Rapids, Michigan, US

Location
- 5363 44th Street Southeast; Grand Rapids, Michigan 49512; United States
- Coordinates: 42°53′06″N 85°32′04″W

Information
- Type: Public, Charter
- Motto: Where attitude meets altitude
- Established: 2010; 16 years ago
- Founders: Dick DeVos, Betsy DeVos
- CEEB code: 231687
- CEO: Nicole Gasper
- Teaching staff: 37.36 (FTE) (2022–23)
- Grades: 9–12
- Gender: Coeducational
- Enrollment: 605 (2022–23)
- Student to teacher ratio: 16.19 (2022–23)
- Campus size: 67,500 sq. ft.
- Campus type: Airport
- Colors: Blue and Orange
- Team name: Aviators Athletics
- Website: westmichiganaviation.org

Student assessments
- 2021–2022 school year Change vs. prior year

M-STEP 11th grade proficiency rates (Science / Social Studies)
- Advanced %: 34.3 / 29.3
- Proficient %: 25.7 / 37.1
- PR. Proficient %: 15.0 / 26.4
- Not Proficient %: 25.0 / 7.1

Average test scores
- SAT Total: 1129.6 (▲ +48.2)

West Michigan Aviation Academy (WMAA) is a charter high school in Grand Rapids, Michigan (U.S.). Students have the option of completing flight training and obtaining a private pilot certificate. US News and World Report ranks the school the 26th best in Michigan.

The school is well-renounced and is ranked in the top 5% of all public high schools worldwide. Students tend to outperform the state average on standardized tests.

== History ==
In 2010, pilot and billionaire Dick DeVos established WMAA on the suggestion of his wife, Betsy DeVos. The academy is a tuition-free public charter high school. The initial enrollment of 80 students assembled for the Fall term of 2010 in a 25,000 square feet (2,300 m^{2}) renovated office facility located on the grounds of the Gerald R. Ford International Airport.

They quickly realized that more space would be needed and it wasn't long before expansion plans were on the drafting board. On the first day of the 2012–13 school year, more than 240 Freshmen, Sophomores, and Juniors found their high school home had expanded with a new 42,500 sq. ft. addition. This new addition enabled not only expansion in space, but also in curriculum, student life, and aviation programs. The new building gave the academy the capacity to educate 500 students.

In 2014, the school administration expected to have a population of 500 for the upcoming fall semester.

Due to high demand for attendance, the school operates on a lottery system to admit students.

The school, like many others, went fully-remote during the COVID-19 pandemic.

In the fall of 2022, the school opened a new facility named the Flight Training Center that houses many of their aviation courses and serves as a hangar for the school's airplanes.

== See also ==
- List of public school academy districts in Michigan
