= Doug DeVos =

American businessman

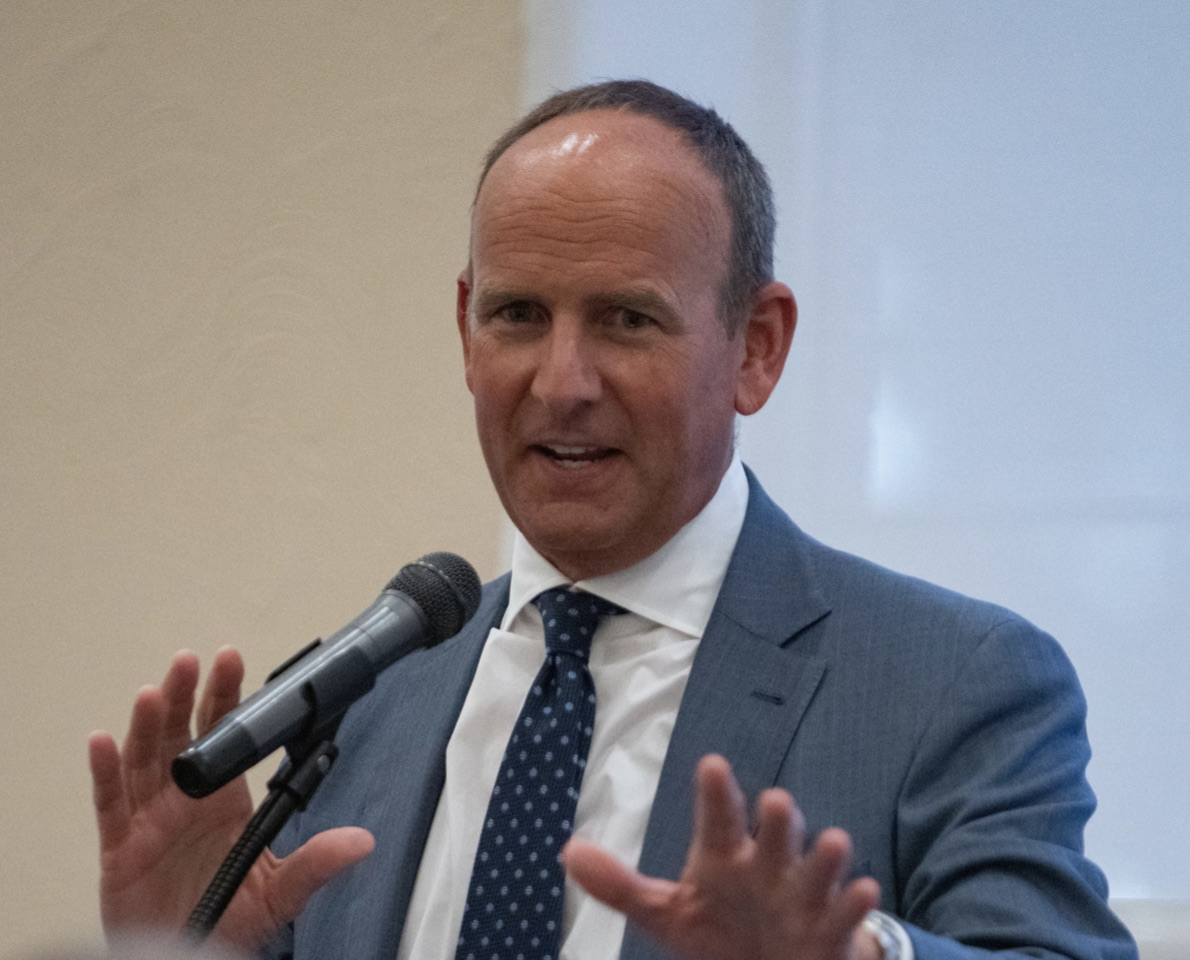
- DeVos in 2019
- Born: October 6, 1964 (age 62); Grand Rapids, Michigan, US
- Known for: Co-Chairman, Amway
- Spouse: Maria DeVos
- Children: 4
- Parent(s): Richard DeVos; Helen Van Wesep
- Relatives: Dick DeVos (brother); Dan DeVos (brother); Betsy DeVos (sister-in-law)

Doug DeVos (born October 6, 1964) is an American businessman and sailor. He and Steve Van Andel are co-chairmen of Amway, which was co-founded by their fathers. DeVos is the chairman of the executive committee of the National Constitutional Center.

== Early life ==
DeVos is the youngest son of Helen June (Van Wesep) and Amway co-founder Rich DeVos, who, with Steve Van Andel's father Jay Van Andel, started Amway in Ada, Michigan, in 1959.

DeVos earned a degree from Purdue University and played quarterback there.

DeVos started at Amway early in his working career and took on various responsibilities and roles before being named president in 2002.

Doug DeVos is the brother of Dick DeVos and brother-in-law to Betsy DeVos, who was the Secretary of Education in the Trump Administration, from 2017 to 2021.

== Amway ==
DeVos was president of Amway from 2002 to 2018 and co-CEO with Steve Van Andel in what was called the office of the chief executive until the end of 2018. The current CEO is Milind Pant^{[2]}.

In 2018, US Commerce Secretary Wilbur Ross appointed DeVos as a member of the US-India CEO Forum.

== Direct selling industry ==
From 2014 to 2017, DeVos was chairman of the World Federation of Direct Selling Associations, a global trade organization representing more than 60 national direct selling associations.

In 2012, he was inducted into the United States Direct Selling Association Hall of Fame along with his brother, Dick DeVos.

== Doug & Maria DeVos Foundation ==
DeVos and his wife Maria established their foundation in 1992. The stated mission of the Foundation: "The Doug & Maria DeVos Foundation is committed to helping youth, families, and the community in greater Grand Rapids obtain the resources and tools to achieve their full potential".

=== Notable Areas of Significant Foundation Support ===
==== Capitalism, Conservative Politics and Christianity ====
- Mackinac Center
- American Enterprise Institute
- National Constitution Center
- Purdue Research Foundation
- Wake Forest University
- Various Christian Causes

==== Grand Rapids Community Causes ====
- Grand Rapids Public Schools
- Amplify GR
- ICCF
- Grand Rapids Student Advancement Foundation
- Believe 2 Become
- First Steps Kent
- K-Connect
- Kent Services Network
- Leading Educators Inc.

(Assessed by the Grand Rapids Institute for Information Democracy in 2019 based on 2015 – 2017 990 documents)

== Sailing ==
DeVos is a member of the New York Yacht Club (NYYC). He teamed with John J. "Hap" Fauth and Roger Penske to lead the club's 2021 entry into the America's Cup with a team named "American Magic" . "American Magic" refers to the first Cup winner, the yacht America of 1851, and the first defender, NYYC's yacht Magic, who successfully defended in 1870. The America's Cup trophy was held by the NYYC for 132 years until 1983. The NYYC successfully defended the trophy twenty-four times in a row before being defeated by the Royal Perth Yacht Club, represented by the yacht Australia II. The NYYC's reign was the longest winning streak - as measured by years - in the history of all sports.

Along with Terry Hutchinson and the Quantum Racing team, DeVos won the 52 Super Series Championship in 2018, the world's leading grand prix monohull yacht racing circuit. DeVos and Quantum also won the championship in 2013, 2014 and 2016. In 2019, DeVos and Quantum finished in third place.

He is also a majority owner of Quantum Sails, a sail manufacturer based in Traverse City, Michigan.

== Awards ==
In 2016, DeVos was honored by the "He Played Football" award from the Joe Tiller Chapter of the National Football Foundation. The award is intended to provide recognition to a former football player from the Northeast Indiana region who went on to become highly successful in life after football.

== Advocate for criminal justice reform ==
In 2019, DeVos supported an effort in Michigan to bring about criminal justice reforms. New measures have been under consideration such as making it easier for ex-offenders and residents to have their criminal histories expunged from the public record. DeVos mentioned the loss to the community when people are not welcomed back after they completed their sentences. He was quoted as saying, “You lose the people who’ve made these mistakes, and you lose the opportunity for them to become productive members of society,” DeVos said. “Not just an employee, but a husband, a wife, a mother, a father, a sister, a brother, a neighbor. These are people in our communities.”

== Christian ministries involvement ==
DeVos has been involved with speaking at and supporting various Christian ministry leadership causes. For instance, he spoke at the Christian Leaders Institute banquet on September 4, 2019.

DeVos was also the former co-chair (along with Christian film and media producer Billy Zeoli) of Gospel Communications International. Gospel Communications International developed the BibleGateway.com website and also trained and hosted hundreds of evangelical ministries on the internet beginning in 1995. Gospel Communications International both sold the BibleGateway.com website and ceased operations on December 15, 2008.

== Personal life ==
Doug is married to Maria and they have four children.
