= Kids Hope USA =

- Founded: October 1994
- Type: Educational organization
- Tax ID no.: 38-3624308
- Purpose: Education, mentorship, students, youth
- Location(s): 201 W. Washington Ave Suite 20; Zeeland, MI 49464
- Coordinates: 42.809129°N 86.0231209°W
- Region served: United States
- Key people: Karen Pearson (President)
- Revenue: $2.08 Million
- Employees: 23
- Volunteers: 11,652
- Website: www.kidshopeusa.org

Kids Hope USA is a national, non-profit organization that facilitates mentoring relationships through a church-school partnership. The nonprofit aims to equip churches to make a lasting community impact. Kids Hope USA connects the local church with a local elementary school and helps operate a school-based mentoring program. In a Kids Hope USA mentor program, students meet once a week for one hour with a mentor—someone who is there just for them. This one-on-one adult attention in a student’s life makes a difference.

== History ==
Kids Hope USA was founded in 1994. After asking experts in law enforcement, education, religion, and health and human services how churches could address the needs of a growing number of children, a unanimous answer was given: Churches that mobilize and train their members to form one-to-one relationships with children can make a profound difference in their lives. Responding to this, in February 1995, Kids Hope USA initiated three partnership sites in Michigan. These programs sparked interest in many other communities, where church and school representatives soon requested program information.

== The Kids Hope USA Way ==
The Kids Hope USA model was designed to teach churches how to create meaningful mentoring relationships with public elementary schoolchildren and provide hope and encouragement during their time together.

One Student: A public elementary or middle school child who benefits from a relationship with a caring and consistent adult.

One Mentor: For an hour each week, a screened and trained mentor spends time with their student and provides friendship, engages in game play, and even helps with some basic academic skills.

How it works: A committed congregation takes ownership of the program and provides a screened and trained mentor and a behind-the-scenes prayer partner. If successful the intervention can increase the social, emotional, and academic skills of children, at no cost to the school.

30 years later, Kids Hope USA exists in 33 states with 11,652 lives impacted during the 2023–2024 school year. Located in urban, suburban and rural communities, these churches range in size from 40 to 5,000 members and represent over 30 different denominations.
