= Richard and Helen DeVos Foundation =

American conservative non-profit organization

The Richard and Helen DeVos Foundation is an American conservative non-profit organization and grant-making body formed in 1970. Based in Grand Rapids, Michigan, the organization was founded by Richard DeVos Sr., co-founder of the multi-level marketing company Amway and former finance chair of the Republican National Committee, and his wife Helen. As of 2014, the foundation had $54.9 million in assets. It is one of five non-profit organizations established and operated by the DeVos family; the others, all founded by siblings of Richard DeVos Jr., include the Dick and Betsy DeVos Foundation; the Daniel and Pamella DeVos Foundation; Cheri DeVos’ CDV5 Foundation; and the Douglas and Maria DeVos Foundation.

== Donations ==
In 2013, the DeVos family donated a total of $90.9 million, with 48 percent going to education, 27 percent to health and community services, 13 percent to churches or faith-based organizations, and 12 percent to arts and culture. Two-thirds of the family's donations were made to organizations based in Michigan. In 2014, the family donated $94 million across education (45 percent); health and community services (35 percent); arts and culture (15 percent); and churches or faith-based organizations (5 percent). A total of 58 percent of the foundation's 2014 giving was to Michigan-based organizations.

In 2011, the foundation provided $3 million to Americans for Prosperity, a conservative political advocacy group. From 2009 to 2010, the foundation donated $2.5 million to the donor-advised fund DonorsTrust.

Other recipients of funding from the DeVos Foundation have included The Heritage Foundation, the American Enterprise Institute, State Policy Network, FreedomWorks, Federalist Society, Mackinac Center for Public Policy, Media Research Center, Free Congress Research and Education Foundation, and Young America's Foundation.

The foundation is a major patron of churches, ministries, Christian schools, and Christian advocacy groups. The foundation has provided substantial funding to various conservative, evangelical Christian organizations including Alliance for Children Everywhere ($1.2 million); Prison Fellowship Ministries, founded by Charles Colson; the Haggai Institute ($1 million) and the Luis Palau Evangelistic Association ($6 million); Coral Ridge Presbyterian Church (more than $1 million); Focus on the Family ($1.3 million), founded by James Dobson; Foundation for Traditional Values; Family Research Council; and the Grand Rapids, Michigan-based Acton Institute.

The DeVos Foundation has donated to Bethany Christian Services and, in 2006, the foundation donated $540,000 to Focus on the Family. The foundation has also provided $5 million in support to the ministry of D. James Kennedy.

The foundation also provides funding to various local social service agencies in West Michigan, including ICCF, the Literacy Center of West Michigan, and Home Repair Services. Other organizations that have received donations from the foundation include the Scripps Research Institute, the OneOrlando Fund and the National Constitution Center.
