= 2006 Michigan gubernatorial election =

- November 7, 2006
- Turnout: 50.7% ▲7.2
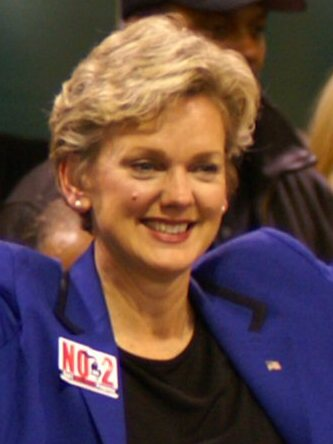

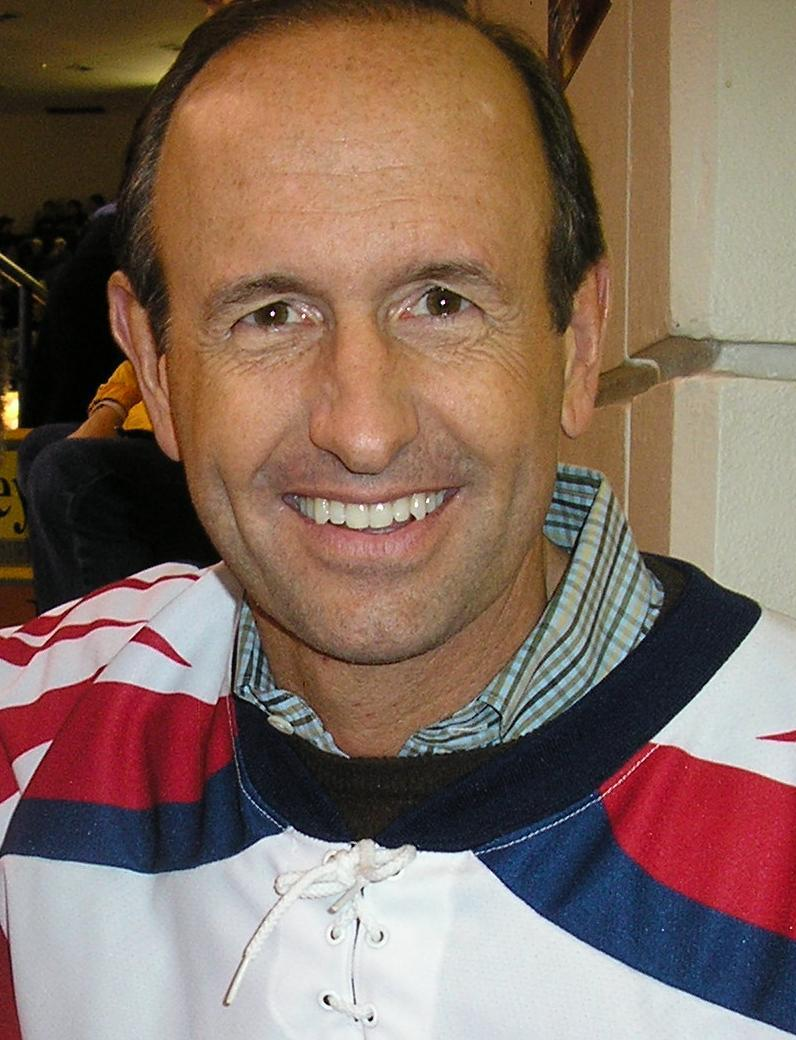
Nominee	Jennifer Granholm	Dick DeVos
Party	Democratic	Republican
Running mate	John Cherry	Ruth Johnson
Popular vote	2,142,513	1,608,086
Percentage	56.36%	42.30%
- Granholm: 40–50% 50–60% 60–70% 70–80% DeVos: 40–50% 50–60% 60–70%
Governor before election
Jennifer Granholm
Democratic
Elected Governor
Jennifer Granholm
Democratic

The 2006 Michigan gubernatorial election was one of the 36 U.S. gubernatorial elections held on November 7, 2006. Incumbent Democratic Governor of Michigan Jennifer Granholm was re-elected with 56% over Republican businessman Dick DeVos and three minor party candidates.

As of 2022, this is the last time the Democratic candidate for governor carried the counties of Keweenaw, Houghton, Ontonagon, Iron, Dickinson, Menominee, Delta, Schoolcraft, Mackinac, Luce, Chippewa, Mason, Lake, Oceana, Van Buren, Cass, Calhoun, Monroe, Jackson, Tuscola, Shiawassee, Montcalm, Ionia, Gratiot, Midland, Clare, Gladwin, Roscommon, Ogemaw, Iosco, Arenac, Crawford, Alcona, Alpena, and Presque Isle.

== Democratic primary ==
=== Candidates ===
- Jennifer Granholm, incumbent governor

=== Results ===
Granholm had no opposition in the primary election, which was held on August 8. She retained incumbent Lieutenant Governor John D. Cherry as her running mate.

Democratic primary results
Party	Candidate	Votes	%
Democratic	Jennifer Granholm (incumbent)	531,322	100.00
Total votes		531,322	100.00

== Republican primary ==
=== Candidates ===
- Dick DeVos, former CEO of Amway

==== Disqualified from ballot ====
- Louis Boven (ran write-in campaign)

==== Withdrawn ====
- Nancy Cassis, state senator from Novi
- Jack Hoogendyk, state representative from Portage

DeVos was originally facing two other Republicans: state Representative Jack Hoogendyk of Portage, and state Senator Nancy Cassis of Novi, both dropped out by the summer of 2005. A political unknown, Louis Boven, tried to challenge him in the primary, but failed to meet Michigan election requirements to get on the ballot. Boven later ran an unsuccessful write-in campaign.

DeVos selected former state representative and Oakland County Clerk Ruth Johnson as his running mate on August 14.

== General election ==
=== Candidates ===
- Douglas Campbell, registered engineer from Ferndale and nominee for governor in 2002 (Green)
  - Running mate: David Skrbina, University of Michigan–Dearborn philosophy professor
- Gregory Creswell (Libertarian)
  - Running mate: Scott Boman, chair of the Libertarian Party of Michigan and perennial candidate
- Bhagwan Dashairya (US Taxpayers')
  - Running mate: Carl Oehling
- Dick DeVos, former CEO of Amway (Republican)
  - Running mate: Ruth Johnson, Oakland County Clerk and former state representative
- Jennifer Granholm, incumbent governor (Democratic)
  - Running mate: John D. Cherry, incumbent lieutenant governor

=== Campaign ===
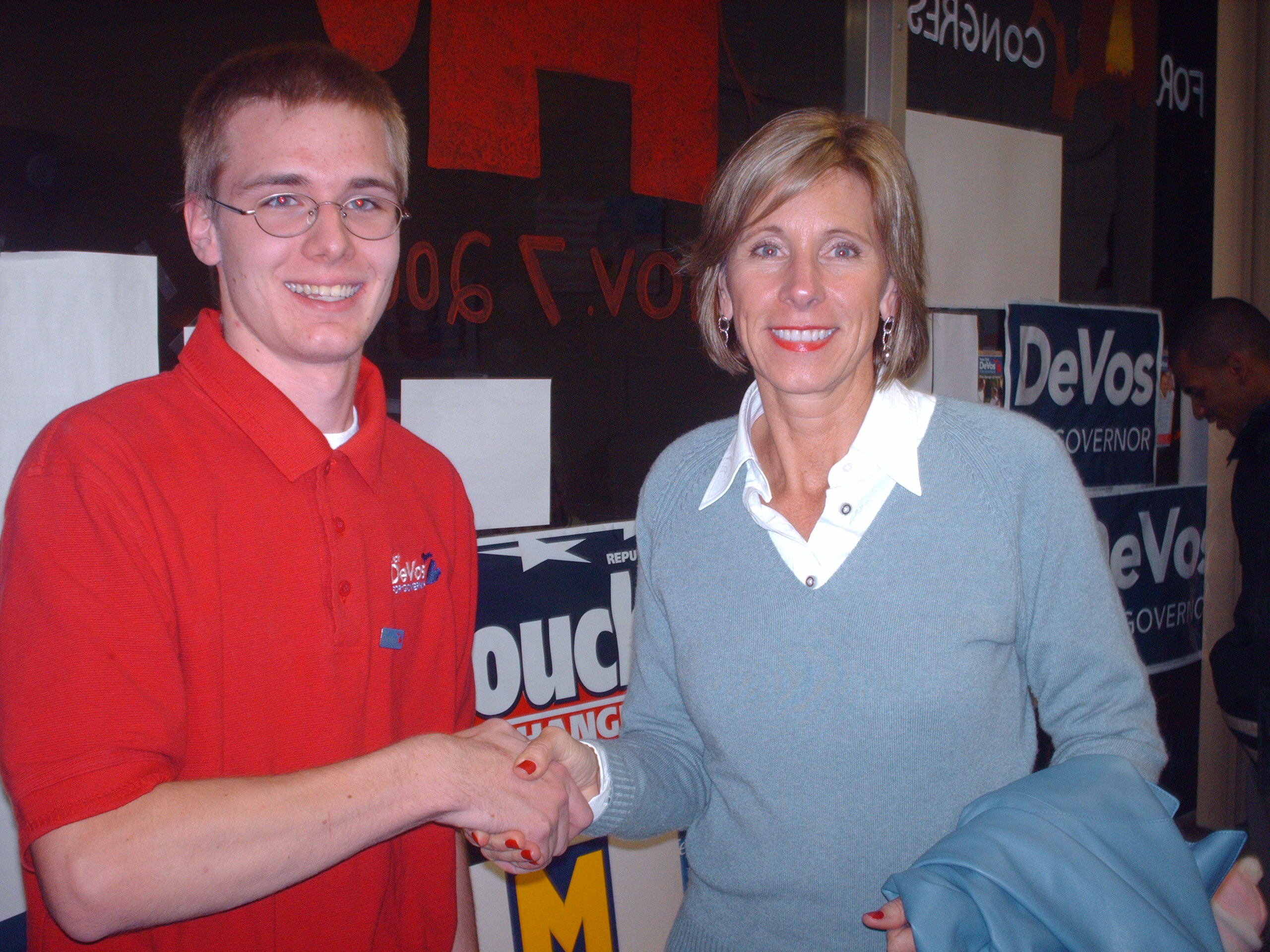
Dick DeVos' wife, Betsy, with a supporter at a campaign event in Houghton County

After her first election as governor in 2002, Granholm was widely seen as a rising star in the Democratic Party. Her popularity dropped after she took office in 2003, largely due to a weak economy and high unemployment. In August 2006, her approval rating was 47 percent.

DeVos, a multimillionaire, had developed substantial political contacts with the full participation of his wife, former Michigan Republican Party chair Betsy DeVos, despite which, fully 85% of the DeVos campaign's contributions were from DeVos' inheritance. As the 2006 election approached, the DeVos family was listed among the biggest Republican campaign contributors in Michigan. The DeVos campaign spent $42.5 million, at that time the most spent on a gubernatorial campaign in Michigan history. $35.5 million of that total came from DeVos' personal fortune, and was at that time the most spent personally by a Republican candidate running for governor. The Granholm campaign spent $15.7 million. The combined money spent by both campaigns made this the most expensive gubernatorial election in Michigan history. As DeVos funded his campaign himself, he was not eligible for public funds.

The DeVos and Campbell campaigns each made the state's economy their major issue. DeVos criticized the Single Business Tax, high unemployment, and job outsourcing which occurred during Granholm's first term; Campbell assailed the $12 billion taken from Michigan's taxpayers and appropriated to the military siege of Iraq (which he calls "Duh-bya's Folly") and advocated for a local currency, independent of the U.S. dollar which he and running mate David Skrbina say is in imminent jeopardy of collapse. Granholm countered that her policies saved thousands of jobs. She also attacked DeVos's partisanship, wealth, and tenure at Alticor. One of Granholm's most prominent lines of attack was the accusation that Alticor, under DeVos's tenure, outsourced thousands of jobs to China while cutting 1,400 jobs in Michigan, a charge that the DeVos campaign and numerous media factcheckers denied. DeVos, Campbell and Granholm criticized the Michigan Civil Rights Initiative which was exclusively supported by Creswell, and passed by a wide margin.

On August 25, 2006, Detroit Mayor Kwame Kilpatrick pledged to actively campaign for Granholm and utilize the campaign team which got him re-elected as mayor.

The Michigan Democratic Party held their state convention in city of Detroit at Cobo Hall, while the Michigan Republican Party held their convention in the City of Novi in Oakland County at the new Rock Financial Showplace.

In October 2006, the Creswell campaign spent over $10,000 on radio advertising, which while small, was the most spent on a such advertising by any Michigan gubernatorial campaign outside the Democratic or Republican parties. The largest investment was made in advertisements on Detroit AM Radio stations WJR and WXYT. These commercials specifically targeted Devos and Granholm by referring to them as candidates of "The two old parties," and berating them for supporting state-supported preferences based on race and sex: A clear reference to MCRI. Campbell spent less than $1,000, as was the case with the Dashairya campaign.

=== Debates ===
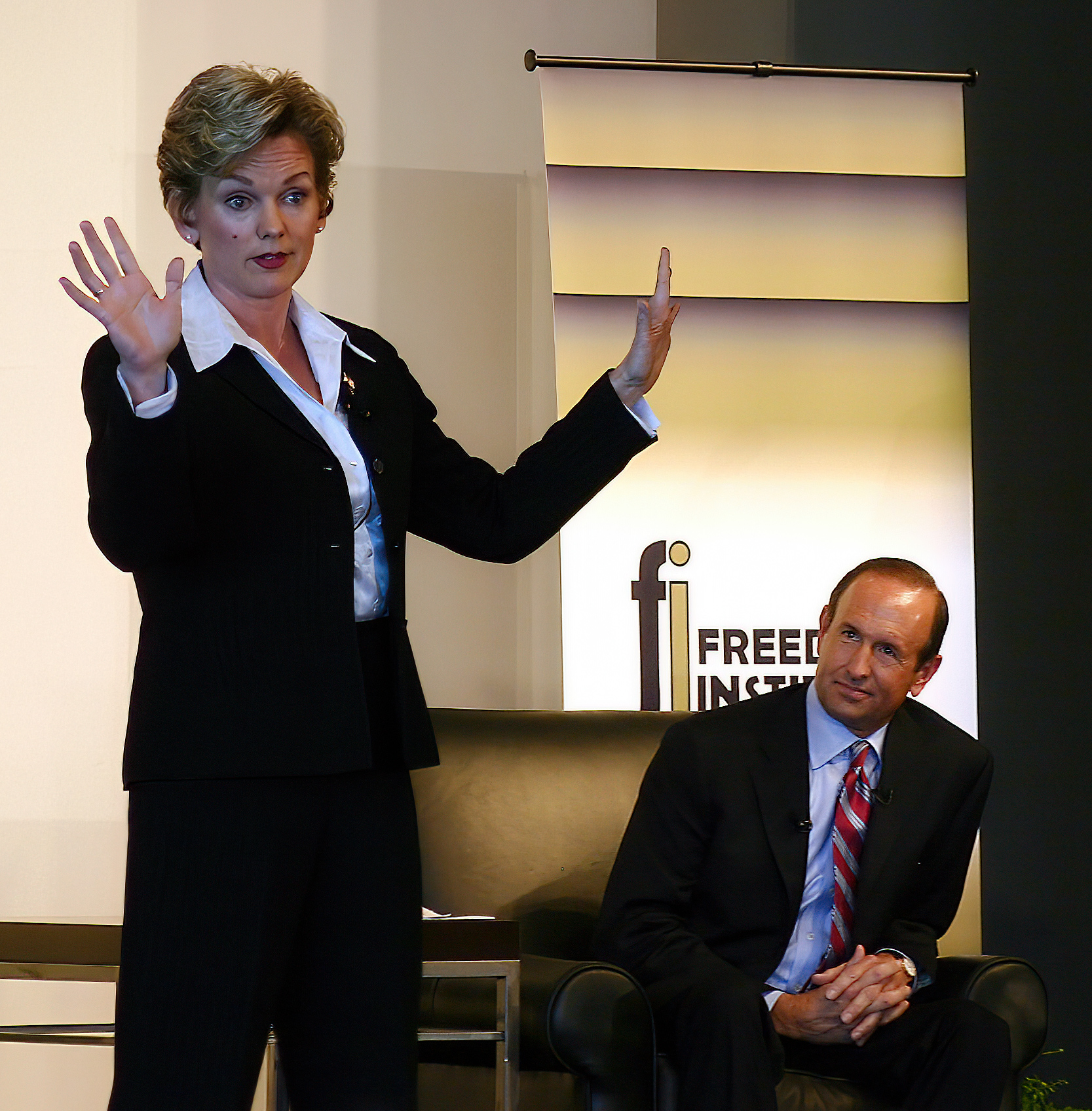
Granholm and Devos at an October 12 informal debate at the Detroit Economic Club

The DeVos and Granholm campaigns agreed to three televised debates and a single joint appearance. This agreement did not include any provision for participation by third-party candidates. Granholm and DeVos appeared together October 12 at the Detroit Economic Club in which each candidate delivered their job plans, which was described as a debate at the event itself, even if it wasn't officially designated as such.

==== WKAR-TV debate ====
The first debate occurred on October 2 at WKAR-TV in East Lansing. Both candidates spent the hour trading charges and countercharges. Detroit News pollster Ed Sarpolus indicated that there was no clear winner in the debate, but Bill Rustem, senior vice president of the nonpartisan policy firm Public Sector Consultants in Lansing, favored Granholm. The consensus of pundits Bill Ballenger, George Bullard, Kathy Barks Hoffman and Rick Albin and capital correspondent Tim Skubick, speaking on the October 6 WKAR-television program Off the Record, was that both DeVos and Granholm emerged losers, losing 2 and 4 percentage points' support after the event. No major gaffes or zingers came out in the debate. Some of the positions were made clear on embryonic stem cell research and abortion. No major gaffes came out in the debate, but one minor zinger was made by Granholm about DeVos' investment in Alterra, a chain of nursing homes which sexually abused and neglected its patients.

==== WOOD-TV debate ====
The second was October 10 at WOOD-TV in Grand Rapids. DeVos was more aggressive than before, declaring that Granholm had lied about him having a controlling stake in Alterra Health Care, an elder-care company that suppressed information about the abuse of residents by its employees. According to SEC filings, DeVos and his investment partners jointly owned 40% of Alterra stock totalling $173 million. The chairman of Alterra's board, while a close associate of DeVos, nevertheless maintains that DeVos had no part of running the company himself.

DeVos also asserted that he had convinced President Bush to set a date to meet with the three major Michigan auto companies. Granholm responded that she did not believe that was true. DeVos admitted after the debate that he misspoke; the president agreed to have a meeting at some point after the election, but did not confirm a date. On October 24, two weeks after this debate was held, a mid-November date was set for the meeting.

==== WXYZ-TV debate ====
The third televised debate was October 16 at WXYZ-TV in Southfield. Unlike the previous debates, this one had an invited studio audience of 30 undecided voters, some of whom asked questions to the participating candidates. Like the two previous debates, only two of the five candidates were admitted. Granholm and DeVos sparred on various issues including college tuition, Canadian trash, business taxes, President Bush and negative ads, while Creswell supporters picketed outside.

During the opening statements of the third debate, Gov. Granholm attacked DeVos for using pictures of dead children as a campaign tool against her. However, it was later revealed that DeVos was not the person using the pictures, but supporters of him, who were cheering for him outside of the debate studio.

==== CMN-TV (of Troy) debate ====
On October 18 CMN-TV in Troy broadcast an additional debate. This debate was not covered by the agreement between the DeVos and Granholm campaigns. It was the only televised debate to which all gubernatorial candidates were invited. It also was only the only televised debate in which the majority of gubernatorial candidates participated. This debate included Libertarian Gregory Creswell, Green Douglas Campbell, and U.S. Taxpayer candidate Bhagwan Dashairya.

=== Predictions ===
Source	Ranking	As of
The Cook Political Report	Tossup	November 6, 2006
Sabato's Crystal Ball	Lean D	November 6, 2006
Rothenberg Political Report	Likely D	November 2, 2006
Real Clear Politics	Lean D	November 6, 2006

=== Polling ===
DeVos, buoyed by the political ads he ran, led in the polls for most of the late spring and early summer. DeVos' lead eroded when Granholm started running ads; meanwhile, Granholm built up a lead as voters found out more about the candidates culminating in the three debates, and as political fortunes soured for Republicans across the country due to a massive backlash against then president George W. Bush and fatigue over the continuing War in Iraq.

Source	Date	Granholm (D)	DeVos (R)	Creswell (L)	Campbell (G)	Dashairya (T)
EPIC-MRA	Nov 6, 2006	49%	42%			
Strategic Vision	Nov 6, 2006	52%	42%			
Mason-Dixon	Nov 5, 2006	52%	38%	0–2%	0–2%	0–2%
Survey USA	Nov 5, 2006	51%	45%	2%	1%	1%
Free Press-Local 4 Michigan Poll	Nov 5, 2006	54%	41%			
EPIC-MRA	Nov 3, 2006	49%	42%			
EPIC-MRA	Nov 2, 2006	52%	43%			
Strategic Vision	Nov 2, 2006	50%	42%			
EPIC-MRA	Oct 31, 2006	52%	42%			
Zogby/WSJ	Oct 31, 2006	51.6%	42.7%	0–5.7%	0–5.7%	0–5.7%
EPIC-MRA	Oct 27, 2006	48%	43%	1%	1%	
Research 2000	Oct 25, 2006	50%	40%			
Survey USA	Oct 25, 2006	52%	45%	1%	1%	
Rasmussen	Oct 25, 2006	53%	42%			
Strategic Vision	Oct 24, 2006	47%	43%			
Zogby/WSJ	Oct 19, 2006	50.6%	44.1%			
Free Press-Local 4 Michigan Poll	Oct 15, 2006	49%	41%			
EPIC-MRA(raw data)	Oct 13, 2006	51%	42%	2%		
Survey USA	Oct 9, 2006	50%	45%	1%	1%	1%
Rasmussen	Oct 8, 2006	49%	42%			
EPIC-MRA	Oct 5, 2006	46%	40%	1%	1%	
Zogby/WSJ	Sept 28, 2006	49.9%	40.8%			
Strategic Vision	Sept 20, 2006	47%	46%			
Survey USA	Sept 18, 2006	47%	47%	1%	2%	1%
EPIC-MRA	September 14, 2006	50%	42%			
Zogby/WSJ	September 11, 2006	49.4%	44.0%			
Rasmussen	September 7, 2006	46%	48%			
Free Press-Local 4 Michigan Poll	September 3, 2006	46%	44%			
Strategic Vision	August 29, 2006	48%	43%			
Zogby/WSJ	August 28, 2006	50.8%	43.6%			
EPIC-MRA	August 23, 2006	49%	42%	3%		
Survey USA	August 22, 2006	47%	47%			
Rasmussen	August 16, 2006	47%	46%			
EPIC-MRA	August 16, 2006	50%	47%			
Survey USA	August 8, 2006	42%	50%	6%		
Rasmussen	August 1, 2006	42%	48%			
Strategic Vision	July 27, 2006	44%	48%			
EPIC-MRA	July 26, 2006	47%	44%			
Zogby/WSJ	July 24, 2006	50.5%	44.4%			
Free Press-Local 4 Michigan Poll	July 15, 2006	42%	47%			
Zogby/WSJ	June 21, 2006	48.1%	46.2%			
EPIC-MRA	June 21, 2006	44%	46%			
Strategic Vision	June 21, 2006	41%	48%			
Rasmussen	June 14, 2006	44%	42%			
EPIC-MRA	June 12, 2006	40%	48%			
Strategic Vision	May 24, 2006	42%	45%			
EPIC-MRA	May 11, 2006	45%	46%			
MRG of Lansing	May 1–9, 2006	43%	44%			
Rasmussen	May 5, 2006	44%	43%			
Strategic Vision	April 21, 2006	43%	42%			
EPIC-MRA	April 11, 2006	43%	43%			
Rasmussen	March 27, 2006	44%	44%			
MRG of Lansing	March 22, 2006	43%	41%			
Strategic Vision	March 15, 2006	50%	33%			
EPIC-MRA	March 9, 2006	51%	41%			
Rasmussen	Feb 14, 2006	44%	43%			
EPIC-MRA	Feb 12, 2006	53%	36%			
Strategic Vision	Feb 3, 2006	48%	34%			
Rasmussen	Jan 20, 2006	49%	38%			
Strategic Vision	Dec 22, 2005	46%	35%			
Rasmussen	Dec 2, 2005	48%	36%			
EPIC-MRA	Nov 29, 2005	58%	35%			
Strategic Vision	Nov 21, 2005	44%	33%			
EPIC-MRA	Oct 25, 2005	53%	30%			
Strategic Vision	Oct 25, 2005	46%	35%			
Strategic Vision	Sept 29, 2005	47%	33%			

=== Results ===
2006 Michigan gubernatorial election
Party	Candidate	Votes	%	±%
Democratic	Jennifer Granholm (incumbent)	2,142,513	56.36%	+4.95%
Republican	Dick DeVos	1,608,086	42.30%	−5.09%
Libertarian	Greg Creswell	23,524	0.62%	
Green	Douglas Campbell	20,009	0.53%	−0.27%
Constitution	Bhagwan Dashairya	7,087	0.19%	−0.20%
Write-in		37	0.00%	0.00%
Majority		534,427	14.06%	+10.04%
Turnout		3,801,256		
Democratic hold		Swing		

==== By county ====
County	Jennifer Granholm Democratic		Dick DeVos Republican		Various candidates Other parties		Margin		Total votes cast
County	#	%	#	%	#	%	#	%	Total votes cast
Alcona	2,793	51.1%	2,583	47.3%	88	1.6%	210	3.8%	5,464
Alger	2,285	60.7%	1,422	37.8%	59	1.6%	863	22.9%	3,766
Allegan	19,586	43.8%	24,571	55.0%	558	1.3%	-4,985	-11.2%	44,715
Alpena	7,187	59.7%	4,689	39.0%	154	1.3%	2,498	20.7%	12,030
Antrim	5,103	44.8%	6,115	53.7%	170	1.5%	-1,012	-8.9%	11,388
Arenac	3,737	56.2%	2,805	42.2%	102	1.6%	932	14.0%	6,644
Baraga	1,952	60.4%	1,220	37.8%	59	1.8%	732	22.6%	3,231
Barry	12,086	47.8%	12,826	50.7%	391	1.6%	-740	-2.9%	25,306
Bay	28,286	60.9%	17,502	37.7%	678	1.4%	10,784	23.2%	46,466
Benzie	4,352	52.8%	3,764	45.6%	131	1.6%	588	7.2%	8,247
Berrien	24,606	46.5%	27,588	52.2%	703	1.3%	-2,982	-5.7%	52,897
Branch	6,901	48.0%	7,248	50.4%	234	1.7%	-347	-2.4%	14,383
Calhoun	26,674	56.6%	19,725	41.9%	692	1.5%	6,949	14.7%	47,094
Cass	8,302	50.3%	8,994	48.4%	221	1.3%	308	1.9%	16,520
Charlevoix	5,237	47.1%	5,621	50.5%	268	2.5%	-384	-3.4%	11,126
Cheboygan	5,457	47.2%	5,891	51.0%	212	1.8%	-434	-3.8%	11,560
Chippewa	7,463	56.5%	5,564	42.1%	184	1.4%	1,899	14.4%	13,211
Clare	6,068	51.7%	5,456	46.5%	219	1.9%	612	5.2%	11,743
Clinton	17,528	54.2%	14,459	44.7%	375	1.2%	3,069	9.5%	32,362
Crawford	2,932	50.5%	2,765	47.6%	106	1.8%	167	2.9%	5,802
Delta	8,792	58.8%	5,973	40.0%	182	1.2%	2,819	18.8%	14,947
Dickinson	5,251	53.8%	4,372	44.8%	145	1.5%	879	9.0%	9,768
Eaton	26,611	57.6%	18,977	41.1%	573	1.2%	7,634	16.5%	46,161
Emmet	6,401	45.5%	7,442	52.9%	225	1.7%	-1,041	-7.4%	14,071
Genesee	107,848	65.8%	54,089	33.0%	2,041	1.2%	53,759	32.8%	163,978
Gladwin	5,588	51.9%	4,962	46.1%	211	2.0%	626	5.8%	10,761
Gogebic	3,821	62.0%	2,216	36.0%	124	2.1%	1,605	26.0%	6,161
Grand Traverse	17,416	47.5%	18,711	51.0%	558	1.5%	-1,295	-3.5%	36,685
Gratiot	7,548	54.4%	6,156	44.4%	173	1.2%	1,392	10.0%	13,877
Hillsdale	6,408	40.8%	9,005	57.4%	281	1.8%	-2,597	-16.6%	15,694
Houghton	6,497	54.3%	5,275	44.1%	200	1.6%	1,222	10.2%	11,972
Huron	7,002	49.2%	7,037	49.5%	182	1.3%	-35	-0.3%	14,221
Ingham	69,820	66.4%	34,037	32.4%	1,228	1.2%	35,783	34.0%	105,085
Ionia	11,700	52.1%	10,470	46.6%	286	1.2%	1,230	5.5%	22,456
Iosco	6,043	53.9%	5,006	44.6%	172	1.5%	1,037	9.3%	11,221
Iron	2,843	58.8%	1,914	39.6%	81	1.7%	929	19.2%	4,838
Isabella	10,676	56.5%	7,916	41.9%	295	1.6%	2,760	14.6%	18,887
Jackson	28,450	50.1%	27,536	48.5%	842	1.4%	914	1.6%	56,828
Kalamazoo	56,044	59.5%	36,942	39.2%	1,218	1.3%	19,102	20.3%	94,204
Kalkaska	2,945	44.0%	3,614	54.1%	127	1.9%	-669	-10.1%	6,686
Kent	109,940	45.7%	128,471	53.4%	2,371	1.0%	-18,531	-7.7%	240,782
Keweenaw	632	54.4%	507	43.7%	22	1.9%	125	10.7%	1,161
Lake	2,228	49.3%	2,203	48.7%	89	2.0%	25	0.6%	4,520
Lapeer	16,580	45.8%	18,951	52.3%	686	1.9%	-2,371	-6.5%	36,271
Leelanau	6,212	51.4%	5,708	47.2%	161	1.2%	504	4.2%	12,081
Lenawee	16,295	47.1%	17,665	51.1%	633	1.8%	-1,367	-4.0%	34,590
Livingston	32,406	41.6%	44,495	57.1%	1,087	1.4%	-12,089	-15.5%	77,988
Luce	1,495	64.7%	789	34.1%	28	1.2%	706	30.6%	2,312
Mackinac	2,879	52.5%	2,540	46.3%	64	1.2%	339	6.2%	5,483
Macomb	164,515	52.2%	145,968	46.3%	4,950	1.5%	18,547	5.9%	315,433
Manistee	5,765	54.4%	4,672	44.1%	162	1.5%	1,093	10.3%	10,599
Marquette	16,341	67.0%	7,773	31.9%	291	1.2%	8,568	35.1%	24,405
Mason	6,173	50.5%	5,913	48.4%	141	1.2%	260	2.1%	12,227
Mecosta	7,045	47.7%	7,547	51.1%	187	1.3%	-502	-3.4%	14,779
Menominee	4,114	53.7%	3,397	44.3%	157	2.1%	717	9.4%	7,668
Midland	17,218	49.5%	17,007	48.9%	526	1.5%	211	0.6%	34,751
Missaukee	2,211	35.6%	3,902	62.9%	89	1.5%	-1,691	-27.3%	6,202
Monroe	29,975	53.9%	24,828	44.6%	824	1.5%	5,147	9.3%	55,627
Montcalm	11,967	53.3%	10,178	45.4%	297	1.3%	1,789	7.9%	22,442
Montmorency	2,128	46.2%	2,394	51.9%	89	2.0%	-266	-5.7%	4,611
Muskegon	40,142	63.5%	22,403	35.5%	622	1.0%	17,739	28.0%	63,167
Newaygo	8,932	47.0%	9,847	51.8%	227	1.2%	-915	-4.8%	19,006
Oakland	275,757	54.0%	227,708	44.6%	6,863	1.3%	48,049	9.4%	510,328
Oceana	5,413	52.2%	4,835	46.6%	125	1.2%	578	5.6%	10,373
Ogemaw	4,561	51.8%	4,109	46.6%	143	1.6%	452	5.2%	8,813
Ontonagon	1,782	56.6%	1,318	41.9%	45	1.4%	464	14.7%	3,148
Osceola	3,884	41.7%	5,274	56.7%	146	1.5%	-1,390	-15.0%	9,304
Oscoda	1,638	46.1%	1,850	52.1%	65	1.8%	-212	-6.0%	3,553
Otsego	4,465	43.4%	5,644	54.9%	168	1.6%	-1,179	-11.5%	10,277
Ottawa	37,055	33.9%	71,220	65.1%	1,076	1.0%	-34,165	-31.2%	109,351
Presque Isle	3,515	55.1%	2,775	43.5%	91	1.4%	740	11.6%	6,381
Roscommon	6,139	52.7%	5,294	45.4%	223	1.9%	845	7.3%	11,656
Saginaw	49,567	61.0%	30,702	37.8%	981	1.3%	18,865	23.2%	81,250
St. Clair	30,369	48.5%	31,170	49.8%	1,096	1.8%	-801	-1.3%	62,635
St. Joseph	8,818	46.2%	9,972	52.3%	285	1.5%	-1,154	-6.1%	19,075
Sanilac	6,897	42.0%	9,290	56.5%	243	1.6%	-2,393	-14.5%	16,430
Schoolcraft	1,973	57.6%	1,395	40.7%	58	1.8%	578	16.9%	3,426
Shiawassee	16,682	56.6%	12,357	41.9%	445	1.5%	4,325	14.7%	29,484
Tuscola	11,634	51.5%	10,592	46.9%	351	1.6%	1,042	4.6%	22,577
Van Buren	14,582	55.3%	11,403	43.2%	384	1.5%	3,179	12.1%	26,369
Washtenaw	91,219	68.0%	41,080	30.6%	1,841	1.3%	50,139	37.4%	134,140
Wayne	459,558	71.6%	175,037	27.3%	7,370	1.1%	284,521	44.3%	641,965
Wexford	5,573	45.6%	6,448	52.8%	192	1.6%	-875	-7.2%	12,213
Totals	2,142,513	56.4%	1,608,086	42.3%	50,567	1.3%	534,427	14.1%	3,801,256

Counties that flipped from Republican to Democratic

- Cass (largest city: Dowagiac)
- Jackson (largest city: Jackson)
- Monroe (largest city: Monroe)
- Van Buren (largest city: South Haven)
- Clinton (largest city: St. Johns)
- Shiawassee (largest city: Owosso)
- Macomb (largest city: Warren)
- Gratiot (largest city: Alma)
- Tuscola (largest city: Caro)
- Montcalm (largest city: Greenville)
- Midland (largest city: Midland)
- Oceana (largest city: Hart)
- Gladwin (largest city: Gladwin)
- Mason (largest city: Ludington)
- Manistee (largest city: Manistee)
- Benzie (largest city: Frankfort)
- Roscommon (largest settlement: Houghton Lake)
- Crawford (largest city: Grayling)
- Mackinac (largest city: St. Ignace)
- Dickinson (largest city: Iron Mountain)
- Houghton (largest city: Houghton)
- Keweenaw (largest city: Ahmeek)
- Ontonagon (largest village: Ontonagon)
- Menominee (largest city: Menominee)
- Leelanau (largest settlement: Greilickville)
- Presque Isle (largest city: Rogers City)
- Alcona (largest city: Harrisville)
- Ionia (largest city: Ionia)

== See also ==
- 2006 United States gubernatorial elections
