= Mikhail Morgulis =

Russian writer (1941–2021)

Mikhail Z. Morgulis (Russian: Михаил Моргулис) (October 1, 1941 – November 16, 2021) was a Russian-language writer, editor and theologian. He was among the first Americans to broadcast sermons in Russian to millions of people living behind the Iron Curtain in Russia, Ukraine, Belarus and other former republics of the Soviet Union and to Russian-speaking audiences in the United States and Canada.

== Personal life and education ==
Mikhail Morgulis was born in Kyiv, Ukraine. His father, Zinovii Morgulis (Russian: Зиновий Моргулис), was a journalist who published in Russian and Ukrainian newspapers and journals. His mother, Lubov Sadanovska was a medical doctor.

Morgulis studied at the Naval College.He studied and graduated Kyiv University. He studied and graduated with MA from Norwich University (Vermont, USA) where he was a teaching in their Russian School during summers. Also a DMin from Seminary.

In 1971 Mikhail Morgulis married Tatiana Titov (Russian: Татьяна Николаевна Титова). They have three children, Val, Z, and Nikola.

== Career ==
In 1972 Morgulis won a coveted award sponsored by the Ukrainian Union of Soviet Writers and the Soviet Ministry of Culture for his collection of stories entitled It's Hope's Turn (Очередь за надеждой). In 1977 he emigrated from the Soviet Union, going first to Vienna and then Rome before settling in New York City. There he wrote for The New Russian Word (Новое Русское Слово) and Russian Thought (Русская Мысль) in Paris. At the same time he worked in a relief organization for Soviet immigrants. His articles and stories also appeared in the journals Continent (Континент), Time and Us (Время и Мы), The World (Мир), The New Journal (Новый журнал) and Panorama (Панорама), as well as in the literary almanacs Three Anniversaries for Andrei Sedykh (Три юбилея Андрея Седых) and Kaleidoscope (Калейдоскоп).

In the 1980s he edited two literary journals, Literary Abroad (Литературное зарубежье) and Literary Courier (Литературный курьер), both intended to offer an opportunity for Russian-language writers and readers in exile, primarily in the United States.

In 1982, by an invitation from Slavic Gospel Association, he moved to Chicago where he helped establish the Slavic Gospel Press which published over 100 works in Russian and Ukrainian, including copies of the Bible and translations of text by C.S. Lewis, G.K. Chesterton, Dietrich Bonhoeffer and others. Mikhail also began a series of spiritual radio broadcasts to the Soviet Union, beginning with his own literary novellas, Farewell, Cranes (До свиданья, журавли), and The Fate of the Clown (Судьба клоуна) that later appeared as audio-albums.

In 1990, he was one of the first Americans to broadcast Christian programming on Soviet television. In 1991 he visited Russia with a delegation of American spiritual leaders and they met with president of USSR Mikhail Gorbachev and other political figures. He prayed in the Kremlin and in the KGB headquarters.

Mikhail Morgulis continued his work through Christian Bridges International (Международный Христианский Мост) and founder of Spiritual Diplomacy Foundation (Духовная Дипломатия) located in North Port, Florida. He wrote and participated in an active ministry. He served as the Honorary Consul of Belarus in North Port, Florida.

== Published books ==
- 1989 Return to the Red Planet: 22 Days in Gorbachev's Backyard (Scripture Pr Pubns) ISBN 0-89693-764-X.
- 1991 Dreams of My Life (Сны моей жизни) (Zoloti vorota) ISBN 5-88490-003-1.
- 1993 The Sermon of the Good Samaratin (Притча о добром самаритянине) (Moscow).
- 1994 What is the Most Terrifying Thing? (Что самое страшное?) (Moscow).
- 1995 The Cross and Love (Крест и Любовь) (Sacramento).
- 1996 Russia, between Sword and Cross. With Melissa Rose Marshall.
- 2001 Spiritual Diplomacy: real-life stories (Духовная Дипломатия: невыдуманные истории).
- 2005 Yearning for Paradise (Тоска по раю). (Moscow).
- 2006 "Country of Mum flowers, mountains and blessings" ("Cтрана хризантем гор и благословений") (New York)
- 2012 It Was a Dream (Это был сон) (Moscow). ("Unost")
