= Dan DeVos =

American ice hockey executive

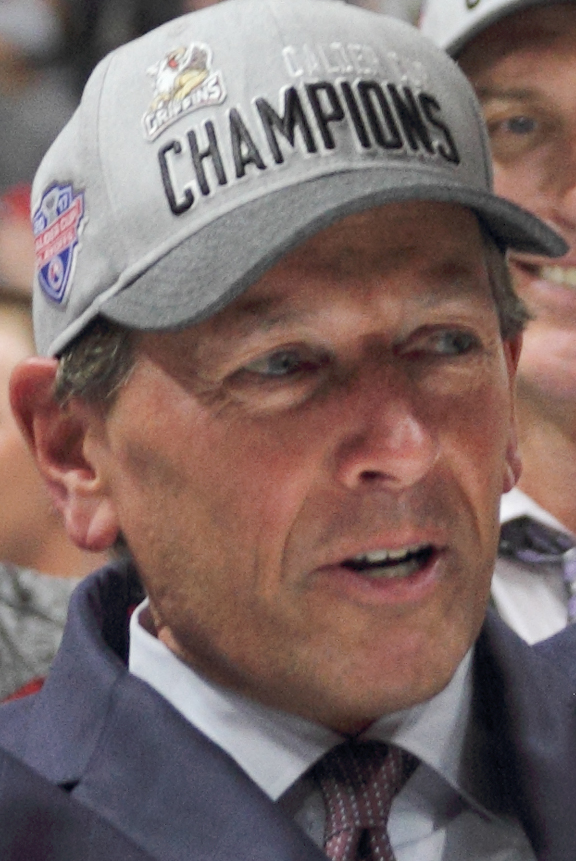
- DeVos in 2017
- Born: c. 1959; Grand Rapids, Michigan, U.S.
- Citizenship: American
- Education: Northwood University
- Occupation: Businessman
- Years active: 1993–present
- Employer: DP Fox Ventures
- Spouse: Pamella Roland
- Children: 3
- Parent(s): Richard DeVos; Helen Van Wesep
- Relatives: Dick DeVos (brother); Doug DeVos (brother); Betsy DeVos (sister-in-law)

Daniel G. DeVos (born c. 1959) is an American businessman and sports executive. He is the son of Helen June (Van Wesep) and Amway co-founder Richard DeVos.

== Business ==
Since 1993, DeVos has served as president and chief executive officer (CEO) of DP Fox Ventures based in Grand Rapids, Michigan. DP Fox owns and operates Fox Motors, Fox Harley-Davidson, and Fox Powersports dealerships in Michigan and the Chicago area. The Fox companies collectively represent 41 brands at 28 locations. DeVos was a finalist for the National Automobile Dealer Association's Dealer of the Year award in 2017.

DeVos is a partner in CWD Real Estate Investment in Grand Rapids, Michigan. The company manages 3.2 million square feet of real estate in the western Michigan area, including several prominent downtown properties. The firm is downtown Grand Rapids' largest property owner.

DeVos previously served in several leadership roles at Amway, including vice president of corporate affairs, vice president of the Pacific region, vice president of North America distributor relations, and director of U.S. special events. He currently serves on Amway's board of directors.

== Sports ==
DeVos is chairman of the Orlando Magic of the National Basketball Association (NBA), a position he's held since 2011 and chairman of the Orlando Magic Youth Foundation. Addressing reporters at the team's 2018 media day, DeVos spoke about the strong support from the Orlando community for the team since the DeVos family purchased it in 1991. DeVos: "We're just fortunate that Orlando's been a great place to have a team, with the community support here from the fans and from the sponsorship side. It's outstanding. They've been with us through our ups-and-downs, and we've always appreciated that about Orlando."

He is the majority owner, president, and CEO of the Grand Rapids Griffins of the American Hockey League (AHL). The team won the league championship, the Calder Cup, in 2013 and 2017. After the series clinching game on the team's home ice at Van Andel Arena in 2017, DeVos spoke with the Grand Rapids Press, saying, "What a great way to finish it. In front of a packed house celebrating a title after a great game. Grand Rapids showed again what a great hockey town it is."

DeVos also is former owner of the Arena Football League's Grand Rapids Rampage. Under his ownership, the Rampage won Arena Bowl XV in 2001, defeat the Nashville Kats, 64–42.

He currently serves on the board of directors for the West Michigan Sports Commission.

== Personal ==
DeVos is a member of the board of trustees at Northwood University (Midland, MI), vice chairman of the executive committee for the Grand Valley State University Foundation (Allendale, MI), and a member of the board of trustees for the Hope Network Foundation.

== Awards and honors ==
Award	Year
IHL Executive of the Year	1996–97

Sporting positions
Preceded by Richard DeVos	Orlando Magic principal owner 2018–present	Incumbent
Business positions
Preceded by Richard DeVos	RDV Sports, Inc. Chairman; 2018–present	Incumbent
