= Christian Leaders Institute =

Religious educational institution

- Abbreviation: CLI
- Established: 2006; 20 years ago
- Founders: Rev. Henry Reyenga Jr. Richard DeVos; Ron Parr
- Type: Nonprofit
- Headquarters: West Spring Lake Rd, Spring Lake, Michigan 49456
- Affiliations: Association for Biblical Higher Education (ABHE), International Association of Bible Colleges and Seminaries (IABCS)
- Website: [christianleadersinstitute.org christianleadersinstitute.org]

Christian Leaders Institute (CLI) is a 501(c)(3) non-profit and educational ministry, founded in 2006, that offers free online correspondence religious classes. Christian Leaders Institute is one of the religious organization of Christian Leaders Ministries, which was founded in 2001. Other ministries at Christian Leaders Ministries are Christian Leaders Alliance and Christian Leaders College.

== History ==
Christian Leaders, NFP (now Christian Leaders Ministries) was founded by Rev. Henry Reyenga Jr., Richard DeVos and Ron Parr on September 20 of 2001, prompted by the attack on the World Trade Center on September 11, 2001. Reyenga contacted DeVos and Parr to support a freemium model of ministry training.

Rev. Reyenga had planted churches and worked with the Bible League before co-founding Christian Leaders Institute. He has spoken at various conferences throughout the world, in places like Winebrenner Theological Seminary.

Dr. David Feddes, previously the English broadcast minister for the Back to God Ministries, became the Provost in 2008. Feddes is a PhD graduate from Trinity Evangelical Divinity School.

The president of the CLI Board of Trustees is Brian DeCook.

== Academics ==
While Christian Leaders Institute does not explicitly promote any individual Christian tradition and multiple theological ideas may be presented in any individual course, materials are primarily presented from an Evangelical and Reformed perspective, as a significant portion of the staff, instructors, and administration are tied to the Christian Reformed Church or attended the church's seminary, Calvin College.

Christian Leaders Institute uses Moodle as its digital campus and wordpress as its marketing platform. Their world headquarters are located in Spring Lake, Michigan. CLI uses moodle in such a way as to include the tracking of quizzes and assignments for the establishment of quality accountability, transcripts, and feedback. Christian Leaders Institute offers over 180 credits of religious training. One CLI graduate, John Ntui-Abung was published in 2017. In his "acknowledgement" of "The Chaos of the Prosperity Gospel: A Case Study of Two Prominent Nigerian Pastors with Churches over 150 Countries Revealed to Be Spreading Fraudulent Gospels", Ntui-Abung credited CLI's education as correcting his prosperity gospel views in Nigeria.

== Funding ==
Christian Leaders Institute is funded by donations. Some donations are for the non-profit mission, while other donations are for services. CLI characterizes themselves as a “generosity-driven” model of ministry training. They offer religious education certificates, diplomas, and degrees. They are incorporated in the states of Illinois, Florida, and Michigan.

== Denominational affiliation ==
Christian Leaders Institute is non-denominational, but Reyenga and Feddes are graduates of Calvin Seminary with ties to the Christian Reformed Church. CLI began a program of minister ordination with its sister organization, Christian Leaders Alliance CLA in 2014. These ordinations require ministry training at Christian Leaders Institute. They must gather three local endorsements. In the CLA system of ordination, Christian leaders are ordained locally and then are included in the global directory of the Christian Leaders Alliance. The Christian Leaders Alliance ordains both men and women to the office of deacon minister.

== Graduates ==
The school's educational methodology is to decentralize the distance learning into local mentoring relationships. Some local leaders start mentor centers, which form accountability for local learning and practice.

== Accreditation ==
In November 2019, the Association for Biblical Higher Education (ABHE) accepted Christian Leaders College into Applicant Status for accreditation. In February 2024, Christian Leaders College was granted Candidate status, which is recognized by the United States Department of Education and has been listed in ABHE directory since then. As of March 2024, Christian Leaders Institute holds candidate status with the Association for Biblical Higher Education Commission on Accreditation, 5850 T. G. Lee Blvd., Ste. 130, Orlando, FL 32822, 407.207.0808. Candidate status is a pre-accreditation status granted to those institutions that meet the ABHE Conditions of Eligibility and that possess such qualities as may provide a basis for achieving accreditation status within five years.

CHEA seminaries such as Calvin Seminary, Western Theological Seminary and Northern Seminary will accept merited students with the CLI Bachelor of Divinity Degree within their individual acceptance guidelines.
