= Amway North America =

American multi-level marketing company

- Type: Private
- Industry: Multi-level marketing
- Founded: 1959; 67 years ago
- Headquarters: Ada, Michigan, U.S.
- Area served: Worldwide
- Key people: Jay Van Andel; Doug DeVos; Jim Payne; Bill and Peggy Britt; Ron and Georgia Lee Puryear; Brad and Julie Duncan
- Parent: Alticor
- Website: amway.com/en

Amway North America (formerly known as Quixtar North America) is an American worldwide multi-level marketing (MLM) company, founded 1959 in Ada, Michigan, United States. It is privately owned by the families of Richard DeVos and Jay Van Andel through Alticor which is the holding company for businesses including Amway, Amway Global, Fulton Innovation, Amway Hotel Corporation, Hatteras Yachts, and manufacturing and logistics company Access Business Group. After the launch of Amway Global (originally operating under the name Quixtar), it replaced the Amway business in the United States, Canada and the Caribbean, with the Amway business continuing to operate in other countries around the world. On May 1, 2009, Quixtar made the name change to Amway Global and fused the various different entities of the parent company.

Amway Global is a member of the Direct Selling Association and the Better Business Bureau.

== History ==
Rich DeVos and Jay Van Andel initially founded the Ja-Ri Corporation, a multi-level marketing distributorship for Nutrilite products, in 1949. Ja-Ri was incorporated in 1959 and changed its name to "Amway" (American Way) in 1963. As of 2012, Amway operates in more than 100 countries around the world. In 1999, the founders of the Amway corporation launched a sister Internet-based company named Quixtar. The Alticor corporation owns both Amway and Quixtar, plus several other concerns. Quixtar replaced the North American business of Amway in 2001 after the majority of the distributors moved to Quixtar, with Amway operating in the rest of the world.

The move unified the various Amway companies worldwide. "We're now reintroducing our brands in North America, moving away from Quixtar and going back to the Amway name," said Steve Lieberman, managing director of Amway Global. "We decided there were a number of roads we had to go down in order to recreate awareness for a brand that, quite frankly, a lot of people felt had gone away."

== Products ==
Quixtar is the exclusive distributor of Alticor products in the United States and Canada, including Nutrilite dietary supplements, XS Energy Drinks, personal care, home care, air and water purifiers and Artistry cosmetics.

== Business model ==
Quixtar relies primarily on person-to-person referral rather than advertisements for the sale of products; however, Quixtar announced the launch of a multimillion-dollar ad campaign in 2012. A large part of the marketing budget is spent on paying bonuses to distributors. Independent Business Owners (IBOs) were paid more than $370.1 million in bonuses and incentives in the fiscal year 2006. Bonuses are paid for individual sales and sales generated by people one sponsor but not for sponsoring itself.

In 2001, after the majority of Amway IBOs had transferred to the new company, Quixtar completely replaced Amway as the marketing venture for Amway/Alticor products in North American regions. The Quixtar business model differs from the earlier Amway business model in many aspects, such as the way distribution is performed as well as the products and services offered through partner stores. Rather than ordering a product from a distributor who delivers them in person, Quixtar customers can place orders online and have the products shipped to them directly. In mid-2007, however, Quixtar announced they were phasing back in the Amway name over two years and discarding the Quixtar name. Along with the re-branding campaign, Amway Global is investing over 580 million dollars into both increased compensation for IBOs and extensive advertising of the new brand name.

Individuals may buy products through Quixtar's web site with a referral number from an IBO. Quixtar also gives IBOs the option to create free personal websites that can be personalized to focus on health, beauty, health and beauty, and/or gift and incentive products. The referring IBO then receives the retail/wholesale profit (usually 30%), and a percentage ("bonus") of the cost of the sold goods (from 3% up to 31% depending on total PV generated), with Quixtar-exclusive products yielding a higher bonus per dollar in Point Value and Business Value (PV/BV). Quixtar offers a wide range of products for its IBOs to purchase for personal use and/or to sell to customers through Quixtar.com and IBO personal e-commerce sites.

IBOs pay a registration fee and build their businesses through retail sales to customers, referring business to Quixtar.com, and by helping other IBOs build similar businesses. Their earnings are based on their business's sales and the volume of sales and purchases of IBOs registered by them.

=== Income of Quixtar IBOs ===
Quixtar IBOs earn income in different forms in various categories, including IGP (Immediate Gross Profit), Performance Bonus, Leadership Bonus, and other Growth incentives. IGP is the profit made when customers of an IBO buy products and services from Quixtar at retail price. Performance bonus on a scale of 3% to 25% of the group volume (total BV of the sale made by the group) is paid if the PV level of the IBO is more than 100 PV in a month. The leadership bonus is paid at 4% of BV of each qualifying leg, which is at 25% or 7500 PV. Growth incentives are announced by Quixtar every year in the form of bonuses and paid trips at various levels. These bonuses are awarded to IBOs who are at Platinum or higher achievement levels.

Quixtar reports that the average income for an "active" Quixtar IBO in 2005 was $115 a month ($1,380 annually), as documented in The Quixtar IBO Compensation Plan and on a Quixtar website. The average annual Quixtar income for an IBO that qualified at the Platinum level in 2005 (0.1683% of IBOs) was $47,472 and for a Diamond (.0120% of IBOs) it was $146,995. The largest single annual bonus (in addition to monthly incomes) for a Diamond was $1,083,421.

This said, according to Inter@ctive Week, "The commissions aren't all that great, even though they can add up to greater than 50 percent of the cost of the goods sold. If privately held Amway generated $6 billion in sales in 1998 as estimated, then each of its 1 million distributors would have pulled in, on average, only $6,000. It's nice extra income, but a livelihood only for the most talented, hardworking or aggressive. Or, for those with a large personal family tree.

That's because this form of marketing relies on what Ken McDonald, regional vice president at Amway North America, calls "high touch." This is what amounts to the need for agents or distributors to reach out and touch people they personally know, in order to make a sale. Almost all Amway sales start with face-to-face contact between people familiar with each other" (Inter@ctive Week).

An "active" IBO is qualified on the IBO Registration form: Based on an independent survey during 2001, “Active” means an IBO attempted to make a retail sale, or presented the Independent Business Ownership Plan, or received bonus money, or attended a company or IBO meeting in the year 2000. Approximately 66% of all IBOs of record were found to be "Active."

=== IBO Association International ===
The IBO Association International (IBOAI) was founded in 1959 as the American Way Association with the goal of "serving the common interests of Independent Business Owners throughout North America." Members are served by an 18-member Board of Directors who are supported by seven full-time staff. The Association's board members are "elected by its voting members".

=== Accreditation ===
In 2006, Quixtar, in partnership with the IBOAI (IBO Association International) launched the "Quixtar Accreditation" program in order to address concerns about the companies that provide Business Support Materials to Quixtar IBOs. North American Diamonds (high-level IBOs) and their associated training companies may apply to Quixtar to be accredited by the corporation. Among other things, accreditation specifically states that promotion of particular religious or political viewpoints is unacceptable. Additionally, accredited programs must agree to a range of other guidelines, including "full" transparency in any compensation paid for Business Support Materials. The "full" transparency only applies to the IBO's who are participants in the BSM income, for most groups this means Platinums and above, representing a very small percentage of IBO's. Accreditation lasts two years and is enforced through reviews of materials and surveys of IBOs. The full guidelines are listed in the IBO Communications Platform. In April 2006 "eFinity" became the first Quixtar affiliated support organization to receive accredited status.

== Sales and ranking ==
Forbes ranked Alticor, as America's 27th largest privately owned company with estimated revenue of $7.29 billion. In 2006, Internet Retailer ranked Quixtar.com as the number one site in the "health and beauty" category and 18th largest e-commerce site (for revenue) overall.

Quixtar-powered IBOs generated revenues of $1.118 billion for Quixtar for the fiscal year ended December 31, 2006, the fourth consecutive year in which the company surpassed the billion-dollar mark. IBOs also generated record $84.6 million in revenues for Quixtar’s Partner Stores in 2006.

=== Promotion ===
Athletes who have promoted Quixtar or its products include Jamaican Olympic sprinter Asafa Powell, American pole vaulter Jennifer Stuczynski, American Olympic sprinter Sanya Richards, U.S. Olympian Shaun White, Cinematographer Wes Anderson, Chinese Olympic hurdler Liu Xiang; Brazilian soccer player Ronaldinho, heavyweight boxer Evander Holyfield, and Heisman Trophy winner Ron Dayne. Tim Foley, a member of the undefeated 1972 Miami Dolphins, is a Quixtar Founders Crown Ambassador.

Author John C. Maxwell, who writes leadership books including The 21 Irrefutable Laws of Leadership, co-authored Becoming a Person of Influence with Jim Dornan, Quixtar Founders Crown Ambassador and founder of Quixtar support organization Network TwentyOne. Orrin Woodward and Chris Brady, both former IBOAI board members for Quixtar, co-authored the #1 bestseller, Launching a Leadership Revolution. Both Woodward and Brady were terminated by Quixtar and participated in a class action lawsuit against Quixtar alleging that Quixtar operated as an illegal recruitment scheme.

As a guest speaker at the Quixtar LIVE! conference in 2003, Phil McGraw ("Dr. Phil") reportedly described Quixtar as "one of the greatest success stories in American business history." In a 2006 settlement involving a class-action lawsuit brought against McGraw and his Shape-Up diet products, plaintiffs received a share of $6.0 million in Quixtar-brand Nutrilite vitamins and $4.5 million in cash.

=== Sports Interests ===
==== Orlando Arena naming rights ====
In December 2006, Amway secured the naming rights for the Orlando Arena, home to the NBA's Orlando Magic, which was formerly known as the TD Waterhouse Centre. In the deal, the arena became known as Amway Arena. As part of the contract, Amway also had the exclusive right to first negotiations for the naming rights of the arena's successor, and secured in early August 2009 a 10-year deal to name the new facility Amway Center.

On December 20, 2023, Amway Center was formally renamed the Kia Center in partnership with Kia America.

==== San Jose Earthquakes ====
Prior to the 2009 Major League Soccer season, Amway Global signed a three-year deal with the San Jose Earthquakes to become the team's official jersey sponsor.

A major part of the partnership is focused on community initiatives in the Bay Area. As a result, Amway Global is now also the official sponsor of the team's Kicks for Kids program that focuses on fitness and healthy lifestyles, as well as bringing underprivileged children to Earthquakes games.

The partnership also saw the creation of the Amway Global Street Team, which appears at all Earthquakes home games and at a number of soccer and non-soccer events throughout the Bay Area. The members of the Amway Global Street Team give away Earthquakes-branded merchandise and provide soccer skills demonstrations at each event.

As of 2012, Amway officially ended their 3-year contract with the Earthquakes to be their official sponsor.

==== Los Angeles Sol ====
In March 2009, Amway Global signed a multi-year deal to become the official presenting partner of the Los Angeles Sol of Women's Professional Soccer. That deal would last only one year, as the Sol folded after the 2009 season.

== Controversies ==
=== Litigation ===
For several years Quixtar was involved in litigation with the tools businesses of former Crown Distributor Kenny Stewart and Double Diamond Brig Hart. In February 2008 a federal judge dismissed the case.

A class action lawsuit was filed in 2007 against Quixtar and some of its top-level distributors in California, alleging fraud, racketeering, and that the products business and the tools business are pyramid schemes. A similar case filed in California in August 2007 by TEAM affiliated IBOs whose contracts had been terminated was dismissed. On November 3, 2010, Amway announced that it had agreed to pay $56 million to settle the class action, $34 million in cash and $22 million in products, and while denying any wrongdoing or liability, acknowledged that it had made changes to its business operations as a result of the lawsuit. The settlement is subject to approval by the court, which is expected in early 2011. The total economic value of the settlement, including the changes to the business model, is $100 million.

In his online book "Merchants of Deception", former Quixtar IBO Eric Scheibeler stated that he and his family received death threats from his uplines during a business meeting and from an anonymous phone call. In 2006, a Swedish newspaper published statements attributed to Scheibeler which implied that Amway/Quixtar employees were responsible for these threats. Amway and Quixtar sued Scheibeler on February 27, 2007 for defamation. In July 2007, Scheibeler wrote a letter to an attorney for Amway and Quixtar clarifying among other things that, to his knowledge, Doug DeVos or Amway/Quixtar employees never made any death threats to him.

=== FTC investigations ===
The Federal Trade Commission offers advice for potential MLM members to help them identify those which are likely to be pyramid schemes.

In the 1979 ruling In re. Amway Corp., the Federal Trade Commission determined that Quixtar predecessor Amway was not an illegal pyramid scheme because no payments were made for recruitment. In addition, Amway (and later Quixtar) rules required distributors to sell to at least 10 retail customers per month, or have $100 in product sales, or a total of 50 PV from customer purchases in order to qualify for bonuses on downline volume. Quixtar IBOs are required to report this customer volume on Quixtar.com or they do not receive bonuses on downline volume. Furthermore, an IBO must also personally sell or use at least 70% of the products personally purchased each month. The FTC established that these rules help prevent inventory loading and other potential abuses of the marketing model.

In 1986 Amway Corp. agreed, under a consent decree filed in federal court, to pay a $100,000 civil penalty to settle Commission charges it violated a 1979 Commission order that prohibits Amway from misrepresenting the amount of profit, earnings or sales its distributors are likely to achieve. According to a complaint filed with the consent decree, Amway violated the 1979 order by advertising earnings claims without including in it clear and conspicuous disclosures of the average earnings or sales of all distributors in any recent year or the percent of distributors who actually achieved the results claimed.

The FTC has required the information on average income to be provided to all prospective Quixtar business owners since the above 1979 FTC ruling clearing the Amway business model as legal.

=== Income from tools and business support materials ===
In 1983, Rich DeVos, one of Amway's founders, made recordings which, among other things, communicated his displeasure with several issues regarding some of the high ranking distributors/IBOs. These recordings are entitled "Directly Speaking" and were addressed to Direct Distributors (now called Platinums), who are considered leaders with various responsibilities for their downline group. In January 1983 Rich DeVos announced that Amway would pay Business Volume (BV) on Amway produced tapes. He expressed concern about the level of income from the sale of Business Support Materials (BSM; tapes, CDs, books, and business conferences/functions) compared to the income the high level distributors were making from Amway products. He stated his legal team was concerned if the tool income exceeded 10% of their Amway income, and stated that BV payouts on tapes can never exceed 20% of the distributor's total Business Volume.

A 1985 Forbes magazine article quoted Dexter Yager, an IBO, as stating that about 2/3 of his income is from BSMs.

In 2004, Dateline NBC aired a report, alleging that some high-level Quixtar IBOs make most of their money from selling motivational materials rather than Quixtar products. Quixtar published an official Quixtar Response website where it showed '"Interviews Dateline Didn't Do"'. Quixtar also states on its response site that Dateline declined their request to link to the site.

During the registration process for a new IBO, Quixtar contracts clearly inform prospective IBOs that BSM are optional and that the producers and sellers of the BSM may make profit or loss from their sale (like any other business). This is also publicized on Quixtar websites. Quixtar's Business Support Materials Arbitration Agreement (SMAA) requires the immediate seller of BSMs to buy-back materials, which were purchased only for personal consumption within a 180-day time frame, on commercially reasonable terms, upon request of the purchaser. BSMs purchased for inventory or to be sold to others downline are not covered by the buy back policy.

=== Disputes with TEAM ===
On August 9, 2007, a group of Quixtar distributors, including founders of the TEAM training organization, filed a lawsuit seeking to enjoin Quixtar from enforcing its distributor contracts, including the non-competition and non-solicitation provisions. The plaintiffs alleged that the company knowingly operates as a pyramid scheme, and prevents its distributors from leaving the organization through the aforementioned provisions.

On August 10, 2007, Quixtar announced that it had terminated the businesses of fifteen of the plaintiffs involved in the lawsuit, and sought and received a temporary restraining order and preliminary order of injunction in a Michigan court preventing them from interfering with the LOS, soliciting IBOs for their new company, or disparaging Quixtar or the business in any way. In mid October 2007, Quixtar argued that the former distributors were in violation of the court order since TEAM continued to have meetings and sell motivational materials. In Grand Rapids, Michigan, Quixtar argued that TEAM was using Quixtar's proprietary information to promote its meetings and sell materials. The court held in favor of Woodward and Brady and allowed TEAM to continue to operate.

To enforce the injunction, Quixtar filed an action against 30 anonymous bloggers. Specifically, Quixtar was seeking to discover if Woodward and Brady were involved in a blogging campaign to disparage the company. The California lawsuit was dismissed on October 5, 2007.

In 2009, Woodward and his wife Laurie were found liable in an arbitration case for soliciting other distributors to resign from Quixtar and join its competitor MonaVie, The Woodwards were ordered to pay a settlement of $12,736,659. TEAM Co-defendants Chris and Terri Brady ordered to pay $9,578,756 and Tim and Amy Marks, $3,533,230.

=== Google bombing ===
In the summer of 2004, some Quixtar leaders and IBOs allegedly launched a Web initiative designed to make their web pages more prominent in search results, aka Google Bombing.

== See also ==
- Amway
- Amway Australia
