= Amway Australia =

- Type: Private
- Industry: Multi-level marketing
- Founded: 1971; 55 years ago
- Headquarters: Chatswood, New South Wales, Australia
- Parent: Amway
- Website: amway.com.au

Amway Australia is the affiliate of the United States company Amway that serves Australia and New Zealand. The company began in 1971. Amway Australia is a multi-level marketing firm.

== History ==
Amway Australia opened in April 1971 and was Amway's first market outside of North America. The company launched quickly, registering more than 400 distributors in its first month of operation, however sales soon stagnated. Investigations revealed problems with quality control at local manufacturers and the decision was made to manufacture and ship products from Amway headquarters in the US. By 1993, wholesale sales had reached A$148 million. In that year Amway Australia became part of the publicly listed company, Amway Asia Pacific, and by 1998 sales had reached A$198 million, with more than 100,000 distributors marketing over 2,500 products. In 2000 Amway Asia Pacific returned to private ownership by New AAP Limited, a Bermuda corporation.

In March 1998, Amway Australia launched its first internet based ordering system (ELVIS - Electronic Link Via Internet Services), and processed $15.9 million in sales in July 1998. In April 2000 ELVIS was replaced by a2k and Amway Australia became one of the first Amway affiliates to introduce a new business model, dubbed IMC (where the "I" stands for Independent Business Owner [IBO], the "M" stands for a new Member classification, and "C" stands for Client). Along with Amway products, the new portal provided access to various partner company products, including IBM, Petals, R. M. Williams, Blue Star Office Supplies, and AFS Financial services. In 2000 it was reported that Amway was the largest direct selling company in the Australian region with annual turnover of more than $170 million and a network of 100,000 home-based distributors. Thirty percent of products sold by Amway Australia come from Australian suppliers, with the rest from Amway factories in the US, Europe, and Asia.

By 2010, 40% of people joining Amway Australia were under the age of 30 and the company had embraced social media such as Facebook and Twitter as part of their sales and communications processes, as well as increasing brand marketing efforts through the signing of endorsement deals with swimmer Libby Trickett and Australian cricketer Adam Gilchrist as "Ambassadors".

== Local operations ==
Amway Australia has one business centre in Castle Hill, New South Wales.

== Controversy ==
The "direct selling" company has been dogged by allegations of being an illegal pyramid scheme for decades. The president of Amway has stated to Australian media that "this is old news".

In 1994, NSW state parliamentarian Mr Scully questioned the Consumer Affairs minister whether Amway Australia's distribution practices used dishonest, unethical and inappropriate behaviour. The Minister for Consumer Affairs replied that "Complaints against Amway or Amway distributors are very few and indicate little cause for concern". Following a complaint from Amway, the department had prosecuted one Amway distributor for misleading conduct involving the potential recruitment of Amway distributors into another work-at-home scheme.

In 2003, the Australian Taxation Office challenged deductions made by Amway Australia over an 8-year period for seminar expenses in resort locations, offered as incentives to successful distributors. Amway had a partial win with the Federal Court ruling Amway was largely entitled to the deductions, however it was ruled that substantial food and drink bills associated with the seminars were not deductible. In 2004, this ruling was overturned and the deductions were allowed in full because it was a serious business occasion.
