= ECoupled =

eCoupled is a proprietary near-field wireless energy transfer technology developed by Fulton Innovation, a division of Alticor. It provides wireless power transfer via inductive coupling between a primary transmission coil and a secondary receiving coil. A single primary coil can provide power to multiple secondary coils at the same time.

eCoupled technology uses its wireless data transfer and authentication capabilities to automatically identify compatible products that need to be charged, the products' charge states, and the most efficient level at which to power the device(s) in question. It also stops power transmission when the device with the receiving electricity is turned off or fully charged. Power can be transferred at up to 98 percent efficiency. eCoupled is designed to provide wireless power transfer for products ranging from low-power devices such as cell phones and media players to laptop computers and power tools. Fulton Innovation has over 220 patents filed and pending on the eCoupled system.

== History ==
eCoupled technology is not the first system developed to transmit energy wirelessly. Transformers use inductively coupled circuits to transmit electrical energy. Energy transmission without wires was pioneered by researchers such as Nikola Tesla, Heinrich Rudolf Hertz, and Guglielmo Marconi.

eCoupled was developed by researchers at sister company Amway roughly ten years ago, and first sold as part of Amway's eSpring water purification system in 2001. Previously, the design team had experienced issues with the durability and corrosion of electrical connections inside the device. By replacing the wired power supply with an inductively coupled one, the eSpring design team was able to hermetically seal the electrical components, improve reliability, and simplify the overall product design.

In 2008, it was announced that Fulton Innovation was forming the world's first Wireless Power Consortium with other companies such as Texas Instruments, Philips, and Sanyo to establish a global standard for wireless power delivery.

== See also ==
- Inductive charging
- Inductive coupling
- Near field
- Splashpower
- Wireless energy transfer
- Alticor
- Amway
