= Network TwentyOne =

Training and support organisation

Network Twentyone
- Type: Private
- Industry: Education
- Founded: 1989
- Founder: Jim & Nancy Dornan
- Headquarters: Atlanta, Georgia, United States
- Area served: Worldwide
- Website: n21corp.com

Network Twentyone, is a training and support organization for distributors working with the Amway business. It was founded in 1990 by Jim and Nancy Dornan, distributors with Amway, originally to support their Amway network in the United States and Australia. Network Twentyone provides complete "turnkey business support solutions" for Amway Independent Business Owners from meetings and function production including education, recognition and motivation to web applications and multi-media products designed to aid you in building a profitable Amway business. These materials are often referred to as Business Support Material (or "BSM"). BSM are promoted to a captive market represented by fellow IBOs ("Independent Business Owners") as well as potential IBOs, creating an opportunity for an additional and independent source of income to that derived from bonus payments arising from the sales generated within the network. The income of those who have reached significant levels can be substantially more through the sales efforts of BSM, to several or perhaps many IBOs Network TwentyOne operates in more than 40 countries and is considered one of the largest adult education organizations in the world.

== History ==
Jim & Nancy Dornan began an Amway business in 1971. After their son Eric was born with severe birth defects they rapidly built one of the largest Amway businesses in North America. In the late 1980s and early 90s Amway began to expand and the Dornans decided there was an opportunity to develop a support system to work with Amway internationally.,. In 1990 they founded Network 21 with a goal to build a business system "that ignores borders and languages". Initially based in the US and Australia, Network 21 expanded rapidly in Eastern Europe, China, Indonesia, Turkey, Philippines and later India.

In 1997, Network 21's "training material" was depicted in the Polish film Welcome to Life. The director and producer were later acquitted on the charge of disseminating false information.". The film, banned for 12 years, was one of the highly anticipated movies of 2009's Warsaw Film Festival and was described in the press by one of the promoters as a "scary movie about brainwashing" that depicts hard-sell "pep rallies" and distributors stating meetings were operated similar to the Communist Party and methods of recruitment that confusingly resembled those of a sect. A best-seller on the local video black market., the film was later banned and its producers fined for using Network 21's copyrighted material. As of 2009 the film was still banned due to an ongoing case brought by "private individuals" ridiculed in the film.

In May 2007, the UK Government's Department of Trade and Industry (DTI) petitioned to ban Network Twentyone and Amway after a year-long investigation alleging practices revolving around distributors being more focused on selling their motivational books, tapes and seminars to salespeople than peddling Amway merchandise. The complaint also focused on recruitment tactics that inflate income estimates for new salespeople. The petitions were dismissed after certain "defects of the old business model" were changed such as Amway allowing "misrepresentations" of its business by independent sellers in years past and failing to act decisively against the misrepresentations.

== Business Operations ==
Network 21 publishes and distributes books and audio/visual training based programs and coordinates seminars for clients in 35 countries. Members refer to themselves as "network builders" and are taught personal development and methods to expand their business network, including goal setting, prospecting, and "how to invite". Network 21 reportedly has a greater "product focus" than some other Amway training organisations. Apart from Jim & Nancy Dornan, leadership includes Robert Angkasa, Paul & Linda Agus, and S.R. Kristiawan (Indonesia), Hans & Eva Nusshold (Europe), and Mitch & Deidre Sala (Australia).

=== Network of Caring ===
Network of Caring was founded in 1994 as the philanthropic arm of Network TwentyOne, originally to help AIDS orphans in Uganda. Through enlisting the help of other Amway IBOs associated with the organisation, more than a million dollars a year is sent to that country. In partnership with World Vision, Network of Caring and affiliated IBOs have donated millions to the feeding, housing, and education of children throughout the world. World Vision has recognized Network of Caring and Network TwentyOne's members as their largest corporate network of child sponsors. Together with Free Wheelchair Mission, Network of Caring has provided wheelchairs to the disabled in South Africa and Ukraine

== See also ==
- Amway
- Quixtar
- Multi-level marketing
