= N21 =

N21 or N-21 may refer to:

== Buses and trams ==
- N21 (Long Island bus), New York
- London Buses route N21
- N21, a night-operated bus service of the Angel 21

== Roads ==
- N21 road (Belgium), a National Road in Belgium
- Route nationale 21, in France
- N21 road (Ireland)
- N21 (Cape Town), in South Africa
- Nebraska Highway 21, in the United States

== Other uses ==
- HMS Abdiel (N21), a minelayer of the Royal Navy
- Network TwentyOne, an Amway support organization
- Nieuport 21, a French First World War fighter
- Nitrogen-21, an isotope of nitrogen
- Tumbuka language
- N21, a postcode district in the N postcode area
