= Artistry =

Artistry is significant artistic skill.

Artistry may also refer to:

- Artistry (cosmetics), a brand of cosmetics
- Artistry Music, a record label
- Artistry, a 1974 album by Eumir Deodato
- Artistry, a 1992 album by Martin Taylor (guitarist)
