= Morrison v. Amway Corp. =

- Court: United States Court of Appeals for the Fifth Circuit
- Full case name: R. JOE AND DAWN MORRISON, KELLY ROBBINS, RANDY AND JANET COUNCILL, DAN AND HELEN HIGGINS, RON & KAREN GREEN, VICTOR & CATHY BROOK, DR. MARION & JEAN MCMURTREY, DAN & HELEN HIGGINS, DR. T. M. & CYNTHIA HUGHES, RICHMOND EAGLE CORP., DAVE & ROSE ROBERTS, DR. RICHARD & LINDA WERNER, TONY & MARYANN CUTAIA, WARREN & DONNA BIRD, TOM & KYE YEAMAN, and WADE & DEBBIE MCKAY v. AMWAY CORPORATION, RICH DeVOS, JAY VANANDEL, DICK DeVOS, STEVE VAN ANDEL, DOUG DeVOS, BOB KERKSTRA, JA-RI CORPORATION, DEXTER YAGER, INDIVIDUALLY AND D/B/A YAGER ENTERPRISES AND INTERNET SERVICES CORPORATION, JEFF YAGER, DONALD R. WILSON, INDIVIDUALLY AND D/B/A WOW INTERNATIONAL AND WILSON ENTERPRISES, INC., RANDY & VALORIE HAUGEN, INDIVIDUALLY AND D/B/A FREEDOM ASSOCIATES, INC., FREEDOM TOOLS, INC. AND ALL STAR PRODUCTION COMPANY, JOHN SIMS, INDIVIDUALLY AND D/B/A SIMS ENTERPRISES, RANDY & SUSAN WALKER, INDIVIDUALLY AND D/B/A WALKER, INTERNATIONAL, MARK & MARTHA HUGHES, BILL & ALYSSA BERGFELD, INDIVIDUALLY AND D/B/A AS BERGFELD INTERNATIONAL, INC., JODY VICTOR, INDIVIDUALLY AND D/B/A JEVI CORPORATION, MARK CORDNER, BILLY ZEOLI, INDIVIDUALLY AND D/B/A GOSPEL FILMS, DENNIS JAMES
- Decided: February 6, 2008

Court membership
- Judges sitting: William Lockhart Garwood, Jerry Edwin Smith, Harold R. DeMoss Jr.

Morrison v. Amway Corp. 49 F. Supp. 2d 529 was a lawsuit concerning the enforcement of a contractual arbitration provision between the defendant Amway Corp. and the plaintiff their distributors.

== Background ==
Amway distributors earn their income from commissions from their sales of Amway products. To become a distributor of Amway products, one must pay a fee and sign a standard distributorship agreement that is renewed annually. The agreement consist of Code of Ethics and Rules of Conduct, right to distribute Amway products, the right to receive sales commissions any products sold for a year. Business Support Materials (BSM) provide media and functions designed to motivate Amway distributors.

In June 1997, the distributors complained about the determination of profits from the sale of BSM materials. This led to Amway amending an arbitration program into the rules of conduct. On January 8, 1998, a group of distributors (the Morrison group) sued Amway in Texas State Court alleging a number of federal and state law claims. The amended arbitration agreement was included in the standard distribution agreement and mailed out to distributors for contract renewal. The case was moved to district court and was stayed pending arbitration on October 15, 1998. Shortly after the Morrison lawsuit, another group of distributors: the Halmonton group, filed a lawsuit with state law claims only on July 1, 1998. This lawsuit was joined by the Morrison group of distributors.

On May 18, 2001, the distributors requested an arbitration, and counter arguments were exchanged by the parties on June 14, 2001. Arbitrator Anne Gifford was selected from JAMS arbitration services provider for Amway, who completed an arbitration course conducted by Amway. The distributors then filed a motion for "Summary Disposition" contending there was no valid agreement prior to the arbitration program and the current arbitration program did not apply to their disputes because it was unconscionable. They also claimed that the arbitration was unfair because Amway selected and trained the arbitrator, and held exclusive powers to remove them. The motion was rejected by Gifford.

After discovery, on Jan. 13, 2005 Gifford ruled in favor of the distributors on all of Amway's claims, and in Amway's favor on all of the distributors’ claims, resulting in $7 million to Amway offset by an award to distributors of $1 million. On January 27, 2005, the distributors moved in the district court to vacate the award alleging Gifford's partiality and “corruption” as well as the unenforceability of the arbitration agreement. This was followed by Amway and the other defendants confirming the award and entering judgment on it. The court sided with the defendant on September 15, 2005, denying the motion to vacate and confirmed the award. The court found that the arbitration clause was not rendered unconscionable because an automatic distributorship renewal form sent by the Amway compelled consent to the arbitration clause.

The distributors moved for rehearing on Sept. 21, 2005, which the district court denied without a hearing; the distributors appealed

== Judgment ==
The distributors argued that the Amway has superior bargaining power and made this modification in the agreement unilaterally, making it a unconscionable contract of adhesion. The appeals court ruled in favor of the plaintiff and held that the arbitration agreement was illusory, lacking in consideration, and unenforceable. The District court erred by compelling arbitration because there was no written arbitration policy at the time the lawsuit was filed. The clause "to comply with the Amway Sales and Marketing Plan, Code of Ethics, and Rules of Conduct as they are amended and published from time to time in official Amway literature," in Amway's Rules of Conduct was illusory, lacking in consideration, and unenforceable.
