= In re Amway Corp. =

1979 US Federal Trade Commission ruling

In re Amway Corp. (93 F.T.C. 618; full name In the Matter of Amway Corporation, Inc., et al.) is a 1979 ruling by the United States Federal Trade Commission concerning the business practices of Amway, a multi-level marketing (MLM) company. The FTC ruled that Amway was not a pyramid scheme according strictly to the statutory definition of a pyramid scheme, but ordered Amway to cease price fixing and cease misrepresenting to its distributors (participants) the average participant's likelihood of financial security and material success.

== Complaint ==
The FTC filed a complaint on March 25, 1975, alleging five counts of violating Section 5 of the Federal Trade Commission Act:

- Count I of the complaint alleged that Amway engaged in resale price maintenance.
- Count II alleged that Amway allocated customers among distributors and restricted the distributors' source of supply as well as the retail outlets through which they may resell;
- Count III alleged that Amway restricted the distributors' advertising.
- Count IV alleged that Amway misrepresented that substantial income may be obtained from geometrical increases in the number of distributors in the chain recruiting operation of the Amway distribution plan.
- Count V alleged that Amway misrepresented the profitability of a distributorship and the potential for recruiting new distributors and failed to disclose the substantial business expense involved and the high turnover of distributors.

Oral arguments were heard on June 6, 1978.

== Results ==
The FTC stated that Amway was not an illegal pyramid scheme since the Amway system is based on retail sales to consumers. Amway avoided being defined as a pyramid scheme by:

- not requiring an entry ("headhunting") fee;
- making product sales a precondition to receiving the performance bonus;
- requiring the buying back of excessive inventory; and
- requiring that products be sold to retail consumers.

The administrative law judge (ALJ) also found that "Amway is not in business to sell distributorships and is not a pyramid distribution scheme."

In the opinion section of the ruling, Commissioner Robert Pitofsky wrote:

Two other Amway rules serve to prevent inventory loading and encourage the sale of Amway products to consumers. The "70 percent rule" provides that "[every] distributor must sell at wholesale and/or retail at least 70% of the total amount of products he bought during a given month in order to receive the Performance Bonus due on all products bought…." This rule prevents the accumulation of inventory at any level. The "10 customer" rule states that "[i]n order to obtain the right to earn Performance Bonuses on the volume of products sold by him to his sponsored distributors during a given month, a sponsoring distributor must make not less than one sale at retail to each of ten different customers that month and produce proof of such sales to his sponsor and Direct Distributor." This rule makes retail selling an essential part of being a distributor. The ALJ found that the buyback rule, the 70-percent rule, and the ten-customer rule are enforced, and that they serve to prevent inventory loading and encourage retailing.

— — 93 F.T.C. 618: Opinion, page 716

The ALJ found, and the FTC opinion agreed, that Amway engaged in:

- resale price maintenance, through explicit agreements on wholesale prices and through practices "designed to insure adherence" to its suggested retail prices even though former explicit agreements on retail prices had been discontinued; and
- misleading sales and earning claims.

In the Final Order, issued on May 8, 1979, Amway and its representatives were ordered to:

- cease allocating customers among their distributors;
- cease retail price fixing;
- print a specific disclaimer on any suggested retail price list; and
- cease misrepresenting profits, earnings, or sales; and stop implying other than average results, unless the average results or the percentage of distributors actually reaching those figures is also conspicuously disclosed.

== Later actions ==
In 1986, Amway agreed to pay a $100,000 penalty in a consent decree for violating the 1979 ruling, after Amway placed ads that represented higher-than-average distributor earnings without stating the actual average results or percentage of distributors who actually met the represented claims.
