= Artistry (cosmetics) =

Amway cosmetics subsidiary

- Product type: Skin care and cosmetics
- Current owner: Alticor
- Country: United States
- Introduced: 1950s
- Markets: Worldwide
- Website: artistry.com

Artistry is a brand of skin care and cosmetic products, owned by Amway headquartered in Ada, Michigan, and sold through Amway's multilevel marketing network.

== Background ==
Edith Rehnborg, wife of Nutrilite founder Carl Rehnborg, founded Edith Rehnborg Cosmetics in 1958, which later became Artistry. In 1972, Nutrilite merged with Amway thereby giving Amway the controlling interest of the Artistry brand. The brand expanded internationally to Australia, Hong Kong, Malaysia, France, the Netherlands, United Kingdom and West Germany.

=== 1980 ===
Artistry products were manufactured at Nutrilite in California and by 1995 they were also produced at the Amway China facility. Over the years, Artistry expanded their product portfolio. As of 2000, the Artistry range included over 400 products.

=== 2023 ===
Artistry Malaysia launched the brand's first ever campaign targeting Gen Z consumers, #IamGenGlow, as part of the launch of a new skincare range, Artistry Studio Skin.

== Partnerships ==
Artistry and Amway have partnered with Australian actress Teresa Palmer and is backed by Sandra Bullock. https://www.forbes.com/sites/melaniehaiken/2012/03/26/how-celebs-subtract-the-years-5-anti-aging-beauty-secrets/?sh=1761216b7db9
