= Nutrilite =

Dietary supplement brand

- Type: Healthcare
- Inventor: Carl F. Rehnborg
- Inception: 1934; 92 years ago
- Manufacturer: Amway
- Available: Yes
- Website: amway.com

Nutrilite is a brand of mineral, vitamin, and dietary supplements developed in 1934 by Carl F. Rehnborg. Nutrilite products are currently manufactured by Access Business Group, a subsidiary of Alticor whose products are sold via Amway worldwide. The Nutrilite brand is known as Nutriway in Denmark, Finland, Norway, Sweden, Turkey, Australia and New Zealand.

== History ==
Carl F. Rehnborg developed the first vitamin and supplement products in the 1930s. His time in China between the end of 1915 and 1927, when famine and hunger were extreme, exposed him to experiences on how to help the body survive, which led him to realize the impact vitamins and nutrients have on general health. He began selling his vitamins and supplements as the California Vitamin Company. In 1939 the company was renamed Nutrilite. In 1945, Rehnborg invented a multi-level marketing selling system to distribute his vitamins. Also in 1945 Lee S. Mytinger and William S. Casselberry became exclusive national distributors and operated a company to distribute the vitamins.

The founders of Amway, Jay Van Andel and Richard DeVos, began as independent distributors selling Nutrilite products in 1949, at a time when the product's previous distributors (Mytinger and Casselberry, Inc.) were involved in a dispute with the U.S. Food and Drug Administration (FDA), which accused them of false advertising. Van Andel and DeVos rose rapidly, becoming top-selling distributors. Concerned about the FDA dispute, they launched a new company, the American Way, (later known as Amway), to use their newly created multi-level marketing system for other household products. The FDA/Mytinger-Casselberry dispute, which went to the United States Supreme Court, was resolved in favor of the FDA in the 1960s.

In 1972, Amway bought a controlling interest in the company. In 1994 they took over complete ownership.

In 2007, the Simply Nutrilite (later renamed Nutrilite Trim Advantage Body System) line was introduced. The line includes meal replacement bars, anti-oxidants, energy drinks, weight loss programs, and essential vitamins and supplements.

Carl's son Dr. Sam Rehnborg is still with the Nutrilite Company today.

== Distribution and marketing ==
Nutrilite's vitamin and mineral products are distributed through a multilevel marketing structure by Amway affiliates known as Independent Business Owners (IBO) in North America and 108 other countries and territories. Nutrilite also has snacks as part of its product line.(Amway, Quixtar, and Access Group are subsidiaries of Alticor).

== Regulatory and safety issues ==
In 1948, the U.S. Food and Drug Administration seized shipments of Nutrilite, then distributed by a California firm, Mytinger & Casselberry Inc. The FDA claimed that a booklet with the product made false claims that it would cure diseases. The distributor brought suit, claiming the seizures were unconstitutional. In 1950, the U.S. Supreme Court ruled that the seizure was constitutional.

In 2009, Amway voluntarily recalled three kinds of Nutrilite energy bars due to potential contamination with salmonella after the FDA tracked the peanut butter salmonella outbreak to a Peanut Corporation of America plant, a vendor Amway had used on occasion.
