= Free Wheelchair Mission =

US-based non-profit organization

The Free Wheelchair Mission is an international faith-based nonprofit, humanitarian organization providing wheelchairs for people with disabilities in developing nations who do not have the resources to obtain one, of whom the World Health Organization estimates number over 70 million.

== Impact ==
The Free Wheelchair Mission has given away over 1.3 million wheelchairs to people in need in over 94 countries.

Countries Served by Free Wheelchair Mission
Afghanistan	Ghana	Pakistan
Albania	Guatemala	Panama
Angola	Guinea	Papua New Guinea
Argentina	Guyana	Paraguay
Armenia	Haiti	Peru
Bangladesh	Honduras	Philippines
Belarus	India	Romania
Belize	Indonesia	Rwanda
Benin	Iraq	Samoa
Bolivia	Jamaica	Senegal
Botswana	Jordan	Sierra Leone
Brazil	Kazakhstan	Somaliland
Burundi	Kenya	South Africa
Cambodia	Kyrgyzstan	Sri Lanka
Cameroon	Laos	Sudan
Chile	Lebanon	Syria
China	Lesotho	Tanzania
Colombia	Liberia	Thailand
Comoros	Madagascar	Tibet
Costa Rica	Malawi	Togo
Cuba	Malaysia	Tonga
Democratic Republic of the Congo	Mali	Trinidad
Djibouti	Mauritania	Uganda
Dominican Republic	Mexico	Ukraine
Ecuador	Moldova	United Arab Emirates
Egypt	Morocco	Uzbekistan
El Salvador	Mozambique	Vietnam
Eswatini	Nepal	Yemen
Ethiopia	Nicaragua	Zambia
Fiji	Niger	Zimbabwe
Gabon	Nigeria	

Headquartered in Irvine, California, this organization was founded by Dr. Don Schoendorfer, who has a PhD in biomedical engineering from MIT and owns over 60 patents. In 2008, Schoendorfer was awarded the civilian Above and Beyond Medal of Honor by retired General Colin Powell at a ceremony at Arlington National Cemetery.

Other awards received by the organization and/or its founder include the CLASSY Award for Health and Well-being in 2012; the US House of Representatives Certificate of Special Congressional Recognition in 2010; the White House Faith-Based Initiatives "Portraits of Compassion- International Service" in 2008; the White House Call to Service Award in 2007; a Proclamation from Chicago Mayor Richard M. Daley in 2007; the Entrepreneur Dream Award from Loyola Marymount University in 2006; a Certificate of Recognition from the California State Assembly in 2006; and the Top Orange County Nonprofit by OC Coast Magazine Community Awards in 2014.

Working in partnership with other like-minded groups, Free Wheelchair Mission has distributed wheelchairs in over 94 developing countries around the world, delivering its one-millionth wheelchair in mid-2017.

Funding for the wheelchairs are provided by private and public donations including individuals, groups, corporations, churches, universities, and foundations. To save on costs and ensure quality control, the wheelchairs are shipped from the factory by the container and assembled by pre-approved distribution partners in recipient countries, which will then be distributed and given to recipients.

== Miracle Wheels Book ==
On December 6, 2022, Founder Dr. Don Schoendorfer released a book entitled Miracle Wheels: The Story of a Mission to Bring Mobility to the World. In it Schoendorfer shares the story behind the "miracle wheels" that have transformed the lives of more than 1.3 million people living with disabilities across 94 developing countries.

== Wheelchairs ==
Free Wheelchair Mission wheelchairs include the GEN_1 wheelchair, the original design; the GEN_2 wheelchair, a more customized fit that received FDA clearance in 2012; and the GEN_3 wheelchair, a foldable version of the GEN_2 for ease in transportation and storage that received FDA clearance in 2013.

GEN_1 made headlines for its simple yet revolutionary retrofitting of a white plastic chair into a multipurpose mobility tool for the less-abled. The design features a standard white resin lawn chair that is positioned and fastened to a steel frame, with two mountain bike tires serving as the wheels. Schoendorfer described it as a "one-size-fits-all" model.

The GEN_2 and GEN_3 come in four sizes: small, medium, large, and extra-large, and can be appropriately adjusted to fit each recipient.

== Recognition ==
In August 2019, the organization was featured by Harry and Meghan, the Duke and Duchess of Sussex, on their Instagram feed along with other organizations including the Earth Day Network and BlinkNow Foundation.
