= Splashpower =

Splashpower Ltd. was a United Kingdom-based company founded in June 2001. It had been attempting to develop technology for wireless charging of portable devices such as mobile phones, personal digital assistants, mp3 players and cameras. Their system worked through electromagnetic induction, adding a free positioning induction loop (at the "SplashPad") to the conventional fix induction loop at the wallplug (used to shift between AC and DC currents). According to the company's claims, rechargeable devices equipped with a small SplashModule were placed upon a mousepad-sized SplashPad and had their batteries recharged at a normal rate.

A Splashpower system was featured on Tomorrow's World (a popular science/IT programme from the BBC) some years ago, where it was given praise and demonstrated a London cafe setting where be-suited executive types were able to charge their phones and PDAs whilst having a power lunch.

As of October 2006 the company had yet to make an announcement as to when products would be commercially available or at what price.

Some technical details of the Splashpower technology can be found in US patent 6,906,495 (available also from the USPTO). As of October 2006 the company had not publicly disclosed key parameters of its technology—such as the power transfer efficiency, the practical limits on power levels, and how tolerant the technology is to the presence of metallic objects in the magnetic field—which made it difficult to evaluate the product.

Splashpower technology was predicted to become available during 2007, but the company was not able to bring the technology to market. As of April 2008, the company had declared bankruptcy.

In May 2008 Splashpower was acquired by Fulton Innovation, the developers of eCoupled wireless power technology.

== See also ==
- Benchmark Capital
- Wireless energy transfer
