= Direct Selling Association =

U.S.-based national trade association

- Formation: 1910
- Purpose: Trade association for direct selling (multilevel marketing) companies
- Headquarters: Washington DC
- Members: 130 companies (approximate)
- Chairman: Kevin Guest
- President and CEO: Joseph Mariano
- Website: dsa.org

The Direct Selling Association (DSA) is a trade association in the United States that represents direct selling companies, primarily those that use multi-level marketing compensation plans. On behalf of its members' companies, the DSA engages in public relations and lobbying efforts against regulation of the multi-level marketing industry, and it funds political candidates through a political action committee.

== History in the US ==
The American DSA, headquartered in Washington, D.C., is the national trade association of a group of firms that manufacture and distribute goods and services sold directly to consumers typically through social selling that includes a compensation model called multi-level marketing.

Founded in Binghamton, New York in 1910 as a trade group for door-to-door salesmen, the association was originally called the Agents Credit Association. It was renamed the National Association of Agency Companies (NAAC) in 1914, and briefly renamed the National Association of Agency and Mail Order Companies in 1917, before returning to the NAAC in 1920. It became the Direct Selling Association in 1968. As of 1970, less than 5% of the DSA's members were multi-level marketing companies. By 2018, the DSA's membership had grown to include nearly 130 companies, more than 90% of which were multi-level marketing companies.

The DSA belongs to the National Retail Federation and its member companies pledge to abide by the DSA code of ethics.

In 2019, DSA helped launch the BBB National Programs Direct Selling Self Regulatory Council. The Direct Selling Self-Regulatory Council (DSSRC) provides impartial monitoring, enforcement, and dispute resolution regarding product claims or income representations (including lifestyle claims) disseminated by direct selling companies and their sales force members. This program provides a robust challenge process that also includes the opportunity for a company to appeal a decision.

== In other countries ==
As of 2011, the DSA has sister organizations in the UK (with over 40 member companies), Australia (nearly 70 member companies), and Israel (7 member companies),

== Political lobbying ==
The DSA serves as a public relations and lobbying group acting on behalf of its member companies. The DSA played a role in petitioning the Federal Trade Commission (FTC) to exempt multi-level marketing companies from consumer protection regulations outlined in the FTC's 2006 proposed Business Opportunity Rule, encouraging people to write 17,000 form letters complaining about the rule from 2006 to 2008. The law was passed in 2012, with most multi-level marketing companies considered exempt.

The DSA supported and allegedly drafted much of the language of the "Anti-Pyramid Promotional Scheme Act" introduced by US Representative Marsha Blackburn, and an amendment to the US House of Representatives' omnibus Financial Services and General Government Appropriations bill for fiscal year 2018 by US Representative John Moolenaar that would have limited the ability of the FTC and other agencies to classify companies as pyramid schemes and to investigate whether MLMs are pyramid schemes. The amendment would have disbarred the Treasury Department, the Judiciary Department, the Small Business Administration, the Securities and Exchange Commission, the FTC, or any other agencies from using any monies to take enforcement actions against pyramid operations for the fiscal year. The Act would blur the lines between legitimate MLM activity and pyramid schemes established under the original 1979 FTC case by deeming sales made to people inside the company as sales to an “ultimate user,” thus erasing the key distinction made in the ruling between sales to actual consumers of a product and sales made to members of the MLM network that are used for recruitment of additional members or to qualify for commissions. The amendment was opposed by a coalition of consumer interest groups including Consumer Action, the Consumer Federation of America, Consumers Union (the publisher of Consumer Reports magazine), Consumer Watchdog, the National Consumers League, and the United States Public Interest Research Group (US PIRG), as well as Truth in Advertising (TINA.org) in its original incarnation.

== Pyramid schemes ==
The DSA has said that pyramid schemes that disguise themselves as direct selling companies have caused confusion in the industry. In 2013, Tupperware left the DSA, citing industry changes and concerns over pyramid schemes. In 2014, Avon (a founding member) left the DSA, citing that its bylaws were inadequate in protecting consumers from fraud. News reports have connected Avon's quitting to pyramid scheme allegations against DSA member Herbalife, which was under investigation by the FTC at the time, and has now been ordered agreed to pay two hundred million dollars in a settlement. The DSA made a statement that they would look at Avon's concerns.
