= Alticor =

American holding company for multi-level marketing business

Alticor, Inc.
- Formerly: Ja-Ri Corporation (1959–1963); Amway Corporation (1963–2000); Alticor, Inc. (2000–present)
- Company type: Private
- Industry: Holding company
- Founded: 1959
- Founder: Richard DeVos; Jay Van Andel
- Headquarters: Ada, Michigan, U.S.
- Area served: Worldwide
- Key people: Steve Van Andel (chairman); Doug DeVos (president)
- Revenue: ▲US$ 9.2 billion (2010)
- Owner: DeVos & Van Andel families
- Number of employees: 13,000
- Subsidiaries: Access Business Group; Alticor Corporate Enterprises; Amway; Amway Global
- Website: www.alticor.com

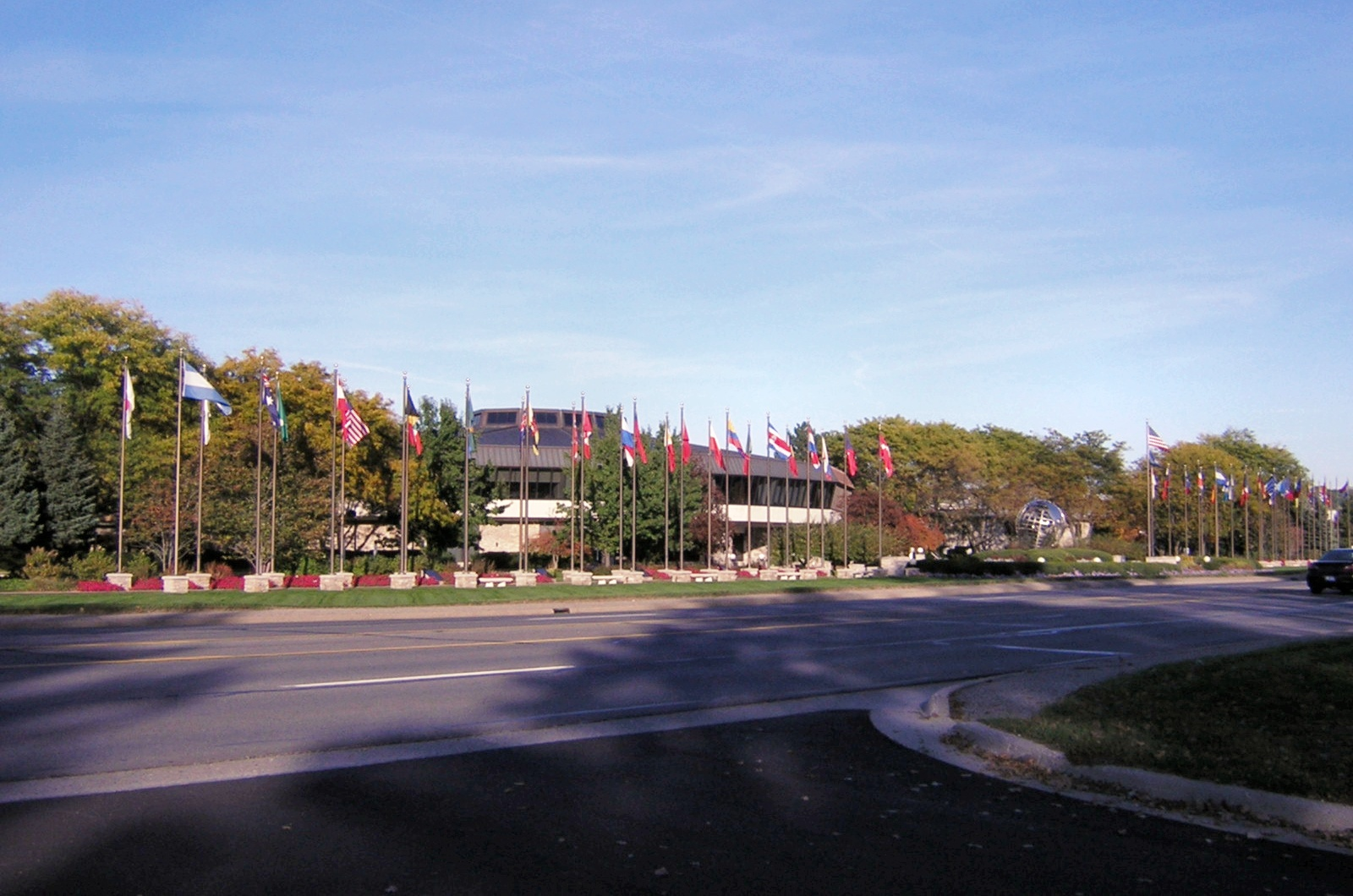
Headquarters in Ada, Michigan

Alticor is a privately owned American corporation run by the DeVos and Van Andel families. It was established in 1999 to serve as the parent company for a handful of business ventures, most notably the multi-level marketing company Amway and Amway Global, and a manufacturing and distribution company, Access Business Group.

In 2006, Alticor purchased cosmetics maker Gurwitch Products from Neiman Marcus Group Inc. and operated it as a wholly owned subsidiary until Gurwitch was acquired by Shiseido in 2016.

== Alticor Corporate Enterprises ==
Founded in 1959, Alticor Corporate Enterprises is a subsidiary holding corporation of Alticor's non-direct selling companies: Amway Hotel Corporation, Gurwitch Products, Interleukin Genetics, Metagenics, and Fulton Innovation. Pyxis Innovations Inc., formed in 2000, purchased ownership in Interleukin Genetics and is a wholly owned subsidiary of Alticor Inc.

=== AHC+Hospitality ===
AHC+Hospitality, formerly Amway Hotel Corporation, is the Alticor hotel subsidiary. AHC owns several hotels in Grand Rapids and the British Virgin Islands.

The Amway Corporation purchased, refurbished, expanded, and renamed the Pantlind Hotel to the Amway Grand Hotel in 1981.

In February 2017, CWD Real Estate Development indicated plans to convert a downtown Grand Rapids building into an AC Hotels by Marriott with 130 rooms to be operated by AHC. By May 2017, Amway Hotel Corporation changed its name to AHC+Hospitality.
