= Jay Van Andel =

American businessman

- Van Andel in 1975
- Born: June 3, 1924; Grand Rapids, Michigan, U.S.
- Died: December 7, 2004 (aged 80); Ada Township, Michigan, U.S.
- Education: Calvin University, Pratt Business School
- Known for: Amway co-founder
- Spouse: Betty Van Andel

Jay Van Andel (June 3, 1924 – December 7, 2004) was an American billionaire businessman, best known as co-founder of the Amway Corporation, along with Richard DeVos.

He also served as chairman of the U.S. Chamber of Commerce from 1979 to 1980.

== Early life ==
Jay Van Andel was born on June 3, 1924, to James and Petronilla (Van der Woude) Van Andel in Grand Rapids, Michigan. His grandparents, Christian and Elizabeth had immigrated to America from the Netherlands in 1909.

Van Andel's parents were devout Christians and members of the Christian Reformed Church. Jay credits his Christian background as being foundational for the rest of his life as a Christian. He once wrote, "Christianity involved the living out of Biblical values of honesty, generosity, and respect for others in our everyday life."

Jay attended Grand Rapids Christian High School. Later, Van Andel attended Calvin College and Pratt Business School in Kansas.

When World War II broke out, Jay served as a United States Army Air Force officer. He was commissioned as a second lieutenant and trained crews for B-17 and B-29 bombers that reached the Japanese mainland.

Jay met his wife Betty Jean Hoekstra while on a direct selling house call in the spring of 1951. They married on August 16, 1952.

== Amway ==
While attending the Grand Rapids Christian High School before World War II, Jay Van Andel met Rich DeVos. In 1949, Van Andel and DeVos became distributors of Nutrilite dietary supplements. They added cleaning products including Liquid Organic Cleaner, to their core line of products in 1958. In 1959, the "American Way Association" began in the basements of the Van Andel and DeVos homes, and later that year "Amway Sales Corporation" was formed. A converted service station became Amway's first outside office building in 1960.

Today, Amway is a direct selling multinational company that sells a variety of health, beauty, and home care products. Amway went on to become the largest direct selling company in the world. Amway corporate reports that in 2019, they have over 3 million independent business owners (IBOs) in over 100 countries.

== Van Andel Institute ==
In 1996, Van Andel founded Van Andel Institute with his wife Betty. The 501(c)(3) nonprofit organization is located in Grand Rapids, Michigan, and focuses on disease research and science education. Researchers look for ways to better diagnose and treat diseases, primarily cancer and neurodegenerative diseases such as Parkinson's. Education programs seek to inspire and prepare students to become the next generation of researchers.

Since 1996, the Van Andel Institute is led by Jay's son, David Van Andel, as chairman and CEO.

== Political activity and philanthropy ==
A strong supporter of the Republican Party, in 2004 Van Andel contributed $2 million to Progress for America, a 527 committee (sometimes referred to as political action committee) established in 2001 to support the re-election campaign of President George W. Bush. In that same year, he donated $475,000 to the Michigan State Republican Party (mostly for state legislature candidates). He was noted for his friendship with former President Gerald R. Ford, a native of Grand Rapids, who lamented his death and called him "a great family man and a worldwide leader in the business arena". Steve Forbes wrote, "Whether in business or philanthropy, Van Andel understood that the primary goal was to serve the needs and wants of other people. He exemplified the best of America".

== Awards ==
In 1981, Van Andel received the Golden Plate Award of the American Academy of Achievement.

In 1993, Jay Van Andel was honored with an Edison Achievement Award for his commitment to innovation throughout his career.

== Death ==
Van Andel and his wife Betty both died in 2004; Betty had Alzheimer's disease, and Jay had Parkinson's. He was 80.
