= Amway =

American multi-level marketing company

Amway Corp.

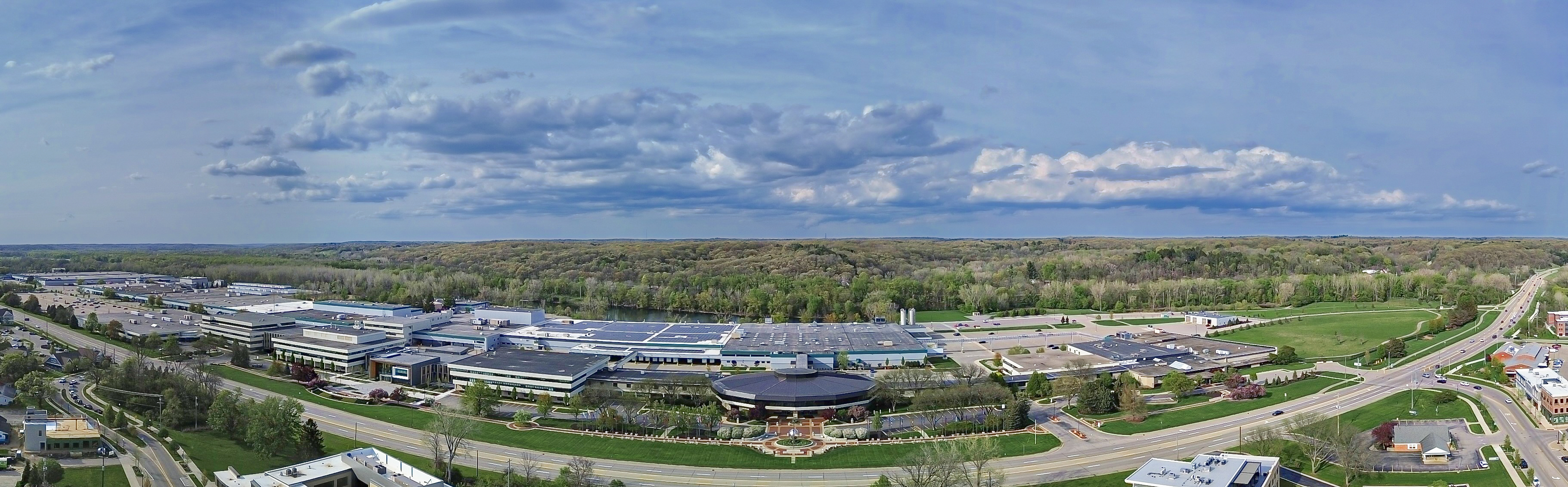
- Headquarters in Ada, Michigan
- Type: Private
- Industry: Multi-level marketing
- Founded: November 9, 1959; 66 years ago
- Founder: Richard DeVos; Jay Van Andel
- Headquarters: Ada, Michigan, United States
- Area served: Worldwide
- Key people: Steve Van Andel (co-chairman); Doug DeVos (co-chairman); Milind Pant (CEO)
- Products: Cleaning agents; skin care; personal care; cosmetics; dietary supplements; protein supplements; beverages; cookware; water purifiers; air purifiers
- Brands: Amway Home, Glister, G&H, Nutrilite, Artistry, AmwayQueen, eSpring, Atmosphere, XS Energy
- Revenue: US$ 8.1 billion (2022)
- Number of employees: 15,000+
- Parent: Alticor
- Website: amwayglobal.com

Amway Corp. (short for "American Way") is an American multi-level marketing (MLM) company that sells health, beauty, and home care products. The company was founded in 1959 by Jay Van Andel and Richard DeVos and is based in Ada, Michigan. Amway and its sister companies under Alticor reported sales of $8.9 billion in 2019. It is the largest multi-level marketing company in the world by revenue. It conducts business through a number of affiliated companies in more than a hundred countries and territories. Products sold by Amway include household cleaners, beauty and skincare products, and health supplements.

Amway has been a major contributor to the Republican Party and GOP candidates, including in 1994 when Amway made the largest corporate contribution to a political party for a single election up to that time. In 1997, it was reported that five Republican Congress members were Amway distributors. The company has reportedly promoted conservative Christian ideology through ownership and co-ownership of non-profit Christian organizations that produced films, books, and media.

The DeVos family owns the NBA team, the Orlando Magic. In 2006, the team’s arena was renamed Amway Arena. A new arena, Amway Center, opened in 2010 and retained the Amway name until Kia obtained the naming rights in 2023.

Amway has been investigated in various countries and by institutions such as the US Federal Trade Commission (FTC) for alleged pyramid scheme practices. The company has paid tens of millions of dollars to settle these suits. In 1983, Amway admitted to defrauding the Canadian government of customs duties and taxes by falsely undervaluing goods it imported into the country over a period of 15 years; it had to pay a fine. Between 2007 and 2008, Amway was found guilty of illegal business practices in India, a ruling upheld by the Supreme Court of India and followed in 2021 by India's Enforcement Directorate attaching company and bank assets, identifying Amway's business model as a pyramid fraud and its product offerings a masquerade.

== History ==
=== Founding ===
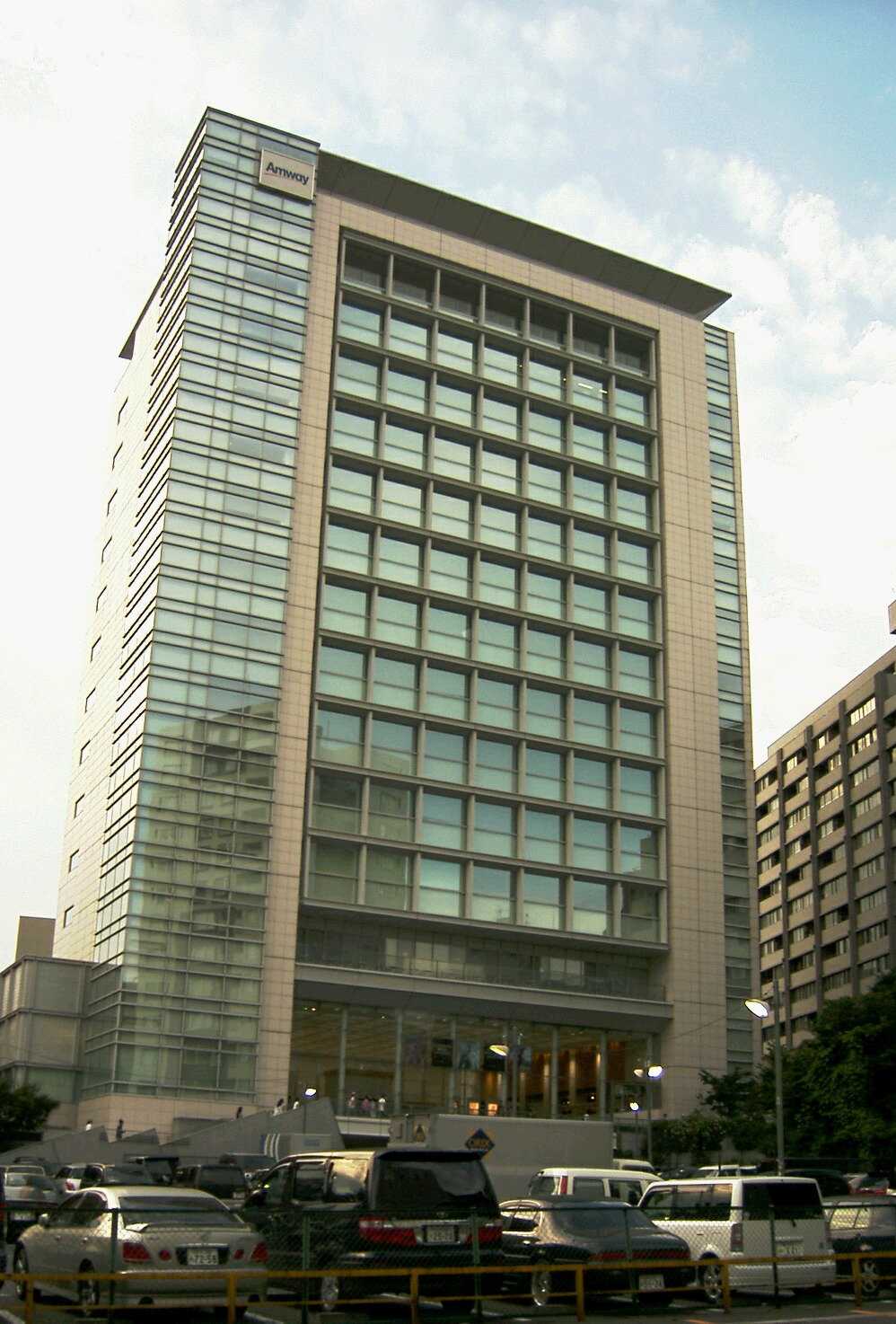
Amway Japan head office

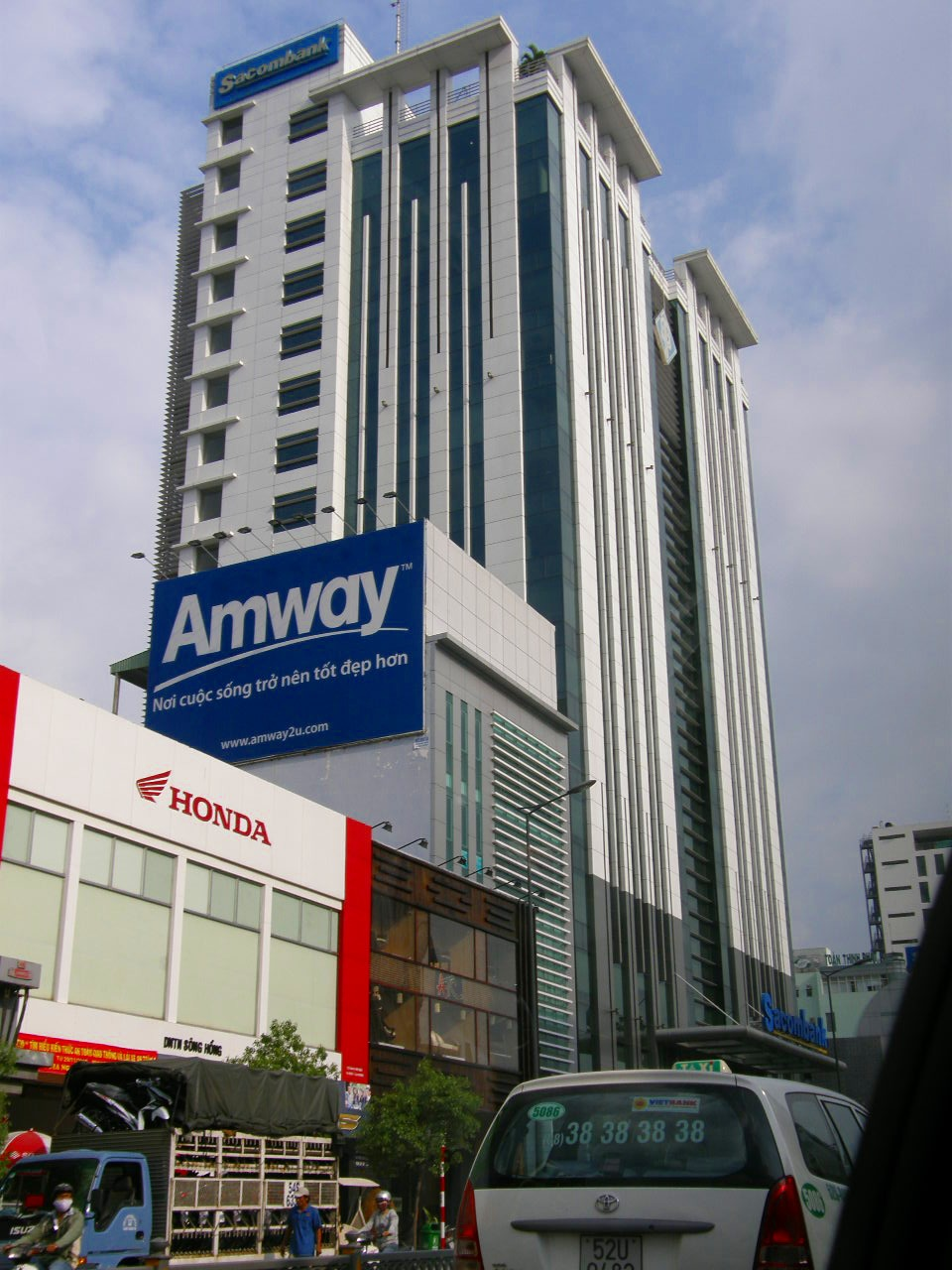
Amway Vietnam (Hồ Chí Minh City)

Jay Van Andel and Richard DeVos had been friends since school days and business partners in various endeavors, including a hamburger stand, an air charter service, and a sailing business. In 1949, they were introduced to the Nutrilite Products Corporation by Van Andel's second cousin Neil Maaskant. DeVos and Van Andel signed up to become distributors for Nutrilite food supplements in August. They sold their first box the next day for $19.50, but lost interest for the next two weeks. They traveled to Chicago to attend a Nutrilite seminar soon afterward, at the urging of Maaskant, who had become their sponsor. They watched promotional filmstrips and listened to talks by company representatives and successful distributors, then they decided to pursue the Nutrilite business. They sold their second box of supplements on their return trip to Michigan, and rapidly proceeded to develop the business further.

Earlier in 1949, DeVos and Van Andel had formed the Ja-Ri Corporation (abbreviated from their respective first names) to import wooden goods from South American countries. After the Chicago seminar, they turned Ja-Ri into a Nutrilite distributorship instead. In addition to profits on each product sold, Nutrilite offered commissions on sales made by new distributors introduced to the company by existing distributors—a system known as multi-level marketing or network marketing. By 1958, DeVos and Van Andel had built an organization of more than 5,000 distributors. However, they and some of their top distributors formed the American Way Association, or Amway, in April 1959 in response to concerns about the stability of Nutrilite and in order to represent the distributors and look for additional products to market.

Their first product was called Frisk, an organic cleaner developed by a scientist in Ohio. DeVos and Van Andel bought the rights to manufacture and distribute Frisk, and later changed the name to LOC (Liquid Organic Cleaner). They subsequently formed the Amway Sales Corporation to procure and inventory products and to handle sales and marketing plans, and the Amway Services Corporation to handle insurance and other benefits for distributors. In 1960, they purchased a 50% share in Atco Manufacturing Company in Detroit, the original manufacturers of LOC, and changed its name to Amway Manufacturing Corporation. In 1964, the Amway Sales Corporation, Amway Services Corporation, and Amway Manufacturing Corporation merged to form the Amway Corporation.

Amway bought a controlling interest in Nutrilite in 1972 and full ownership in 1994.

=== International expansion ===
Amway expanded to Australia in 1971, to parts of Europe in 1973, to parts of Asia in 1974, to Japan in 1979, to Latin America in 1985, to Thailand in 1987, to China in 1995, to Africa in 1997, to India and Scandinavia in 1998, to Ukraine in 2003, to Russia in 2005, and to Vietnam in 2008.

In 2014, a Russian loyalty card program called "Alfa-Amway" was created when Amway joined with Alfa-Bank.

Amway was ranked by Forbes as the 42nd-largest privately held company in the United States in 2018, and as the number one largest company on the Direct Selling News Global 100 list in 2018.

In the United States, the firm has a "much smaller" profile than it once had (according to author Andrea Pitzer), and has posted a web page answering the question “Does Amway still exist?”.

=== Quixtar ===
The founders of the Amway corporation established a new holding company in 1999, named Alticor, and launched three new companies: a sister (and separate) Internet-focused company named Quixtar, Access Business Group, and Pyxis Innovations. Pyxis, later replaced by Fulton Innovation, pursued research and development and Access Business Group handled manufacturing and logistics for Amway, Quixtar, and third-party clients.

The main difference was that each "Independent Business Owner" (IBO) could order directly from Amway on the Internet, rather than from their upline "direct distributor", and have products shipped directly to their home. The Amway name continued being used in the rest of the world. Virtually all Amway distributors in North America switched to Quixtar, prompting Alticor to close Amway North America after 2001. In June 2007, it was announced that the Quixtar brand would be phased out over an eighteen– to twenty-four–month period in favor of a unified Amway brand (Amway Global) worldwide.

== Global markets ==
According to the Amway website, as of 2011 the company operated in over 100 countries and territories, organized into regional markets: the Americas, Europe, greater China, Japan and Korea, and SE Asia/Australia. Amway's top ten markets are China, Korea, the United States, Japan, Thailand, Taiwan, India, Russia, Malaysia and Italy.

In 2008, Alticor announced that two-thirds of the company's 58 markets reported sales increases, including strong growth in the China, Russia, Ukraine and India markets.

=== Amway China ===
Amway China launched in 1995. In 1998, after abuses of illegal pyramid schemes led to riots, the Chinese government enacted a ban on all direct selling companies, including Amway. After the negotiations, some companies like Amway, Avon, and Mary Kay continued to operate through a network of retail stores promoted by an independent sales force. China introduced new direct selling laws in December 2005, and in December 2006, Amway was one of the first companies to receive a license to resume direct sales. However, the law forbids teachers, doctors, and civil servants from becoming direct sales agents for the company and, unlike in the United States, salespeople in China are ineligible to receive commissions from sales made by the distributors they recruit.

In 2006, Amway China had a reported 180,000 sales representatives, 140 stores, and $2 billion in annual sales. In 2007, Amway Greater China and South-east Asia Chief Executive Eva Cheng was ranked no. 88 by Forbes magazine in its list of the World's Most Powerful Women. In 2008, China was Amway's largest market, reporting 28% growth and sales of 17 billion yuan (US$2.5 billion). According to a report in Bloomberg Businessweek in April 2010, Amway had 237 retail shops in China, 160,000 direct sales agents, and $3 billion in revenue. Since then, Amway has been continuing to expand in China, even as the government has been imposing greater restrictions on the company, and launched a WeChat mini-program in 2021.

== Brands ==
Amway's product line grew from LOC, with the laundry detergent SA8 added in 1960, and later the hair care product Satinique (1965) and the cosmetics line Artistry (1968).

In 2018, nutrition and wellness products were 52% of total sales, and beauty and personal care products were 26% of total sales.

=== Household cleaners ===
Amway is best known in North America for its original multi-purpose cleaning product LOC, SA8 laundry detergent, and Dish Drops dishwashing liquid. Consumer Reports conducted blind testing of detergents in 2010 and ranked versions of Amway's Legacy of Clean detergents 9th and 18th of 20 detergents tested. Consumer Reports program manager Pat Slaven recommended against buying the products because consumers can "go to the grocery store and get something that performs a whole lot better for a whole lot less money".

=== Health and beauty ===
Amway's health and beauty brands include Artistry, Satinique, Hymm, Body Series, Glister, Moiskin (South America), Nutrilite, Nutriway (Scandinavia and Australia/New Zealand), Attitude (India), eSpring, Atmosphere and iCook as well as XL and XS Energy drinks. Other Amway brands that were discontinued or replaced include Tolsom, Eddie Funkhouser New York, or beautycycle (Eastern Europe).

==== Artistry ====
Amway's Artistry products include skin care, cosmetics, and anti-aging creams and serums. In 2011, Artistry brand reached sales of $2.8 billion.

==== Nutrilite ====
Amway's largest-selling brand is the Nutrilite range of health supplements (marketed as Nutriway in some countries), and in 2008 Nutrilite sales exceeded $3 billion globally. In 2001, NSF International issued its first five dietary supplement certifications to Nutrilite.

In 2011, Nutrilite brand of vitamins and dietary supplements led Amway's sales, totaling almost $4.7 billion. According to Euromonitor International, in 2014, Nutrilite was the world's No. 1 selling vitamins and dietary supplements brand. In 2015, it was reported that according to Euromonitor International, Amway was the largest vitamin and dietary supplement vendor in China, with 11% of a market that generated 100 billion yuan ($15.6 billion) in annual sales. In 2015, it was reported that according to China Confidential consumer brands survey, Amway Nutrilite was the most popular vitamin and dietary supplement brand in China.

In January 2009, Amway announced a voluntary recall of Nutrilite and XS Energy Bars after learning that they had possibly been manufactured with Salmonella-contaminated ingredients from Peanut Corporation of America. The company indicated that it had not received any reports of illness in connection with the products.

In 2012, the Center for Science in the Public Interest (CSPI), accused Amway of making unsubstantiated and illegal claims about Nutrilite Fruits & Vegetables 2GO Twist Tubes and threatened to launch a class action lawsuit against the company unless it took remedial action. Amway responded that the claims made about the products were properly substantiated and that they did not plan to change the product's labeling but nevertheless would review the statements that CSPI has questioned. CSPI later reported that Amway had agreed to changing product labels by the end of 2014.

=== eSpring ===
Amway's eSpring water filter was introduced in 2000. According to Amway, it was the first system to combine a carbon block filter and ultraviolet light with electronic-monitoring technology in the filter cartridge and it became the first home system to achieve certification for ANSI/NSF Standards 42, 53, and 55. According to Amway, eSpring was the first water treatment system to receive certification for all fifteen NSF/ANSI 401 contaminants which include pharmaceuticals, pesticides and herbicides. The company also claims that, in addition to these 15 contaminants, eSpring is certified for more than 145 potential contaminants, including lead and mercury.

eSpring was the first commercial product which employed Fulton Innovation's eCoupled wireless power induction technology. Companies licensing this technology include Visteon, Herman Miller, Motorola and Mobility Electronics. Fulton was a founding member of the Wireless Power Consortium which developed the Qi (inductive power standard).

In 2007 eSpring was ranked fifth out of 27 brands in a comparison of water filters by Consumer Reports.

=== XS ===
On January 14, 2015, Amway announced that it had acquired XS Energy, a California-based brand of energy drinks and snacks. The XS Energy brand has been sold as an Amway product since 2003. As of January 2015, it has been distributed in 38 countries, generating annual sales of $150 million.

According to Euromonitor International, the XS Energy was the first exclusively sugar-free energy drink brand sold globally.

== Ditto Delivery ==
Ditto Delivery is Alticor's automatic monthly program that delivers more of the same items a customer has previously ordered. As of May 2001, Ditto Delivery accounted for 30% of Quixtar's North American sales.

== Business model ==
Amway combines direct selling with a multi-level marketing strategy. Amway distributors, referred to as "independent business owners" (IBOs), may market products directly to potential customers and may also sponsor and mentor other people to become IBOs. IBOs may earn income both from the retail markup on any products they sell personally, plus a performance bonus based on the sales volume they and their downline (IBOs they have sponsored) have generated. People may also register as IBOs to buy products at discounted prices. Harvard Business School, which described Amway as "one of the most profitable direct selling companies in the world", noted that Amway founders Van Andel and DeVos "accomplished their success through the use of an elaborate pyramid-like distribution system in which independent distributors of Amway products received a percentage of the merchandise they sold and also a percentage of the merchandise sold by recruited distributors".

== Sports sponsorships ==
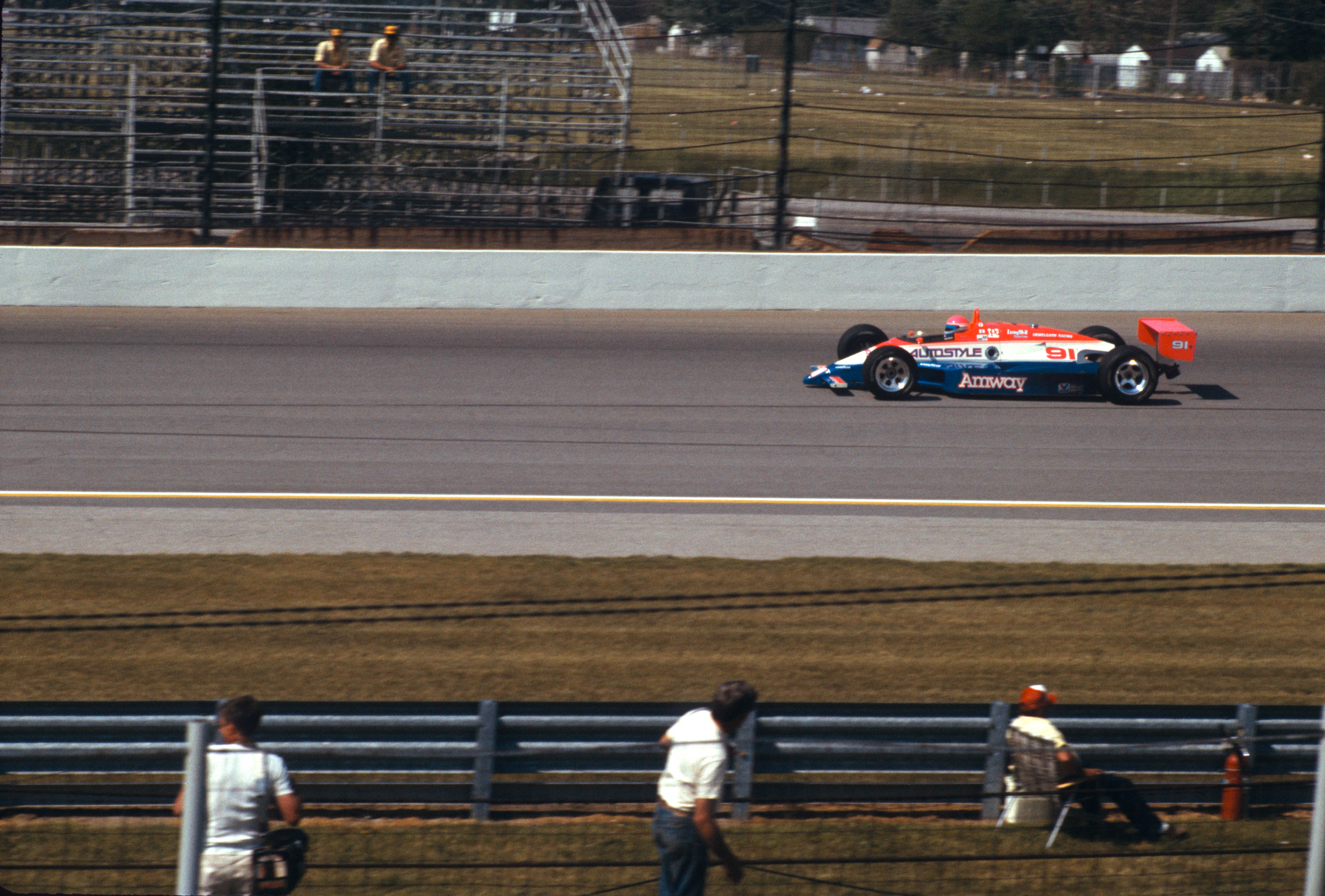
Scott Brayton's Amway sponsored race car at the 1987 Indianapolis 500

In the late 1980s and early 1990s, Amway sponsored racing driver Scott Brayton in the CART IndyCar championship.

In December 2006, Alticor secured the naming rights for the Orlando Magic's home basketball arena in Orlando, Florida. The Orlando Magic is owned by the DeVos family. The arena, formerly known as the TD Waterhouse Centre, was renamed the Amway Arena. Its successor, the Amway Center, was opened in 2010, and the older arena was demolished in 2012 and held the naming rights until December 2023 when Kia bought the rights.

In 2009, Amway Global signed a three-year deal with the San Jose Earthquakes Major League Soccer team to become the jersey sponsor.

In March 2009, Amway Global signed a multi-year deal to become the presenting partner of the Los Angeles Sol of Women's Professional Soccer. The deal, however, would last only one year, as the Sol folded in 2010.

In 2011, Amway signed a three-year deal to be the presenting sponsor of the National Hockey League's Detroit Red Wings.

== Politics and culture ==
=== Political contributions ===
In the 1990s, the Amway organization was a major contributor to the Republican Party (GOP) and to the election campaigns of various GOP candidates. Amway and its sales force contributed a substantial amount (up to half) of the total funds ($669,525) for the 1994 political campaign of Republican congresswoman and Amway distributor Sue Myrick (N.C.). According to two reports by Mother Jones magazine, Amway distributor Dexter Yager "used the company's extensive voice-mail system to rally hundreds of Amway distributors into giving a total of $295,871" to Myrick's campaign. According to a campaign staffer quoted by the magazine, Myrick had appeared regularly on the Amway circuit, speaking at hundreds of rallies and selling $5 and $10 audiotapes. Following the 1994 election, Myrick maintained "close ties to Amway and Yager", and raised $100,000 from Amway sources, "most notably through fundraisers at the homes of big distributors", in the 1997–98 election cycle.

In October 1994, Amway gave the biggest corporate contribution recorded to that date to a political party for a single election, $2.5 million to the Republican National Committee (RNC), and was the number one corporate political donor in the United States. In the 2004 election cycle, the organization contributed a total of $4 million to a conservative 527 group, Progress for America.

In July 1996, Amway co-founder Richard DeVos was honored at a $3 million fundraiser for the Republican Party, and a week later, it was reported that Amway had tried to donate $1.3 million to pay for Republican "infomercials" and televising of the GOP convention on Pat Robertson's Family Channel, but backed off when Democrats criticized the donation as a ploy to avoid campaign-finance restrictions.

In April 1997, Richard DeVos and his wife, Helen, gave $1 million to the RNC, which, at the time, was the second-largest soft-money donation ever, behind Amway's 1994 gift of $2.5 million to the RNC. In July 1997, Senate Majority Leader Trent Lott and House Speaker Newt Gingrich slipped a last-minute provision into a hotly contested compromise tax bill that granted Amway and four other companies a tax break on their Asian branches that totaled $19 million.

In a column published in the Fort Worth Star-Telegram newspaper in August 1997, reporter Molly Ivins wrote that Amway had "its own caucus in Congress...Five Republican House members are also Amway distributors: Reps. Sue Myrick of North Carolina, Jon Christensen of Nebraska, Dick Chrysler of Michigan, Richard Pombo of California, and John Ensign of Nevada. Their informal caucus meets several times a year with Amway bigwigs to discuss policy matters affecting the company, including China's trade status."

A 1998 analysis of campaign contributions conducted by Businessweek found that Amway, along with the founding families and some top distributors, had donated at least $7 million to GOP causes in the preceding decade. Political candidates who received campaign funding from Amway in 1998 included Representatives Bill Redmond (R–N.M.), Heather Wilson (R–N.M.), and Jon Christensen (R–Neb).

According to a report by the Center for Public Integrity, in the 2004 election cycle, members of the Van Andel and DeVos families were the second, third and fifth largest donors to the Republican party.

Dick DeVos, son of Amway founder Richard DeVos and past president of the company, served as Finance Chairman of the Republican National Committee, and his wife Betsy DeVos served as chair of the Michigan Republican Party from 1996 to 2000 and 2003 to 2005.

In May 2005, Dick DeVos ran against incumbent Governor Jennifer Granholm in Michigan's 2006 gubernatorial election. DeVos was defeated by Granholm, who won 56% of the popular vote to his 42%.

In August 2012, gay rights activist Fred Karger began a movement to boycott Amway in protest of the contribution from a private foundation of Amway President Doug DeVos to the National Organization for Marriage, a political organization which opposes legalization of same-sex marriage in the United States.

Betsy DeVos was United States Secretary of Education from 2017 to 2021 under the first Trump administration.

=== Religion ===
Several sources have commented on the promotion of Christian conservative ideology within the Amway organization. Mother Jones magazine described the Amway distributor force as "heavily influenced by the company's dual themes of Christian morality and free enterprise" and operating "like a private political army". In The Cult of Free Enterprise, Stephen Butterfield, who spent time in the Yager group within Amway, wrote "[Amway] sells a marketing and motivational system, a cause, a way of life, in a fervid emotional atmosphere of rallies and political religious revivalism." Philadelphia City Paper correspondent Maryam Henein stated that "The language used in motivational tools for Amway frequently echoes or directly quotes the Bible, with the unstated assumption of a shared Christian perspective."

Businessweek correspondents Bill Vlasic and Beth Regan characterized the founding families of Amway as "fervently conservative, fervently Christian, and hugely influential in the Republican Party", noting that "Rich DeVos charged up the troops with a message of Christian beliefs and rock-ribbed conservatism."

High-ranking Amway leaders such as Richard DeVos and Dexter Yager were owners and members of the board of Gospel Films, a producer of movies and books geared toward conservative Christians, as well as co-owners (along with Salem Communications) of a right-wing, Christian nonprofit called Gospel Communications International. Yager, interviewed on 60 Minutes in 1983, admitted that he promotes Christianity through his Amway group, but stated that this might not be the case in other Amway groups.

Rolling Stone's Bob Moser reported that former Amway CEO and co-founder Richard DeVos is connected with the Dominionist political movement in the United States. Moser states that DeVos was a supporter of the late D. James Kennedy, giving more than $5 million to Kennedy's Coral Ridge Ministries. DeVos was also a founding member and two-time president of the Council for National Policy, a right-wing Christian organization.

Sociologist David G. Bromley calls Amway a "quasi-religious corporation" having sectarian characteristics. Bromley and Anson Shupe view Amway as preaching the gospel of prosperity. Patralekha Bhattacharya and Krishna Kumar Mehta, reasoned that although some critics have referred to organizations such as Amway as "cults" and have speculated that they engage in "mind control", there are other explanations that could account for the behavior of distributors. Namely, continued involvement of distributors despite minimal economic return may result from social satisfaction compensating for diminished economic satisfaction.

=== Chamber of commerce ===
Amway co-founder Jay Van Andel (in 1980), and later his son Steve Van Andel (in 2001), were elected by the board of directors of the United States Chamber of Commerce to be the chairman of the private American lobbying organization.

=== Accreditation program ===
In 2006, Amway (then Quixtar in North America) introduced its Professional Development Accreditation Program in response to concerns surrounding business support materials (BSM), including books, tapes and meetings. In 2010 this was superseded by its Accreditation Plus program to ensure that all BSM content is consistent with Amway's quality assurance standards, which approved providers of BSM must abide by. The quality assurance standards state that

- Promoting political causes or other issues of a personal nature in the Amway Business environment is not permitted
- Spiritual references are not allowed as the message or focus and presenters may not use the stage as a platform to promote religious and/or personal social beliefs
- Endorsement or denouncement of specific candidates, political parties, and/or issues, unless specifically related to the operation of an Amway Business is not allowed.

== Pyramid scheme allegations ==
Robert Carroll, of the Skeptic's Dictionary, has described Amway as a "legal pyramid scheme", and has said that the quasi-religious devotion of its affiliates is used by the company to conceal poor performance rates by distributors.

=== FTC investigation ===
In a 1979 ruling, the Federal Trade Commission found that Amway did not fit the definition of a pyramid scheme because (a) distributors were not paid to recruit people, (b) it did not require distributors to buy a large stock of unmoving inventory, (c) distributors were required to maintain retail sales (at least 10 per month), and (d) the company and all distributors were required to accept returns of excess inventory from down-level distributors.

The FTC did, however, find Amway "guilty of price-fixing and making exaggerated income claims"; the company was ordered to stop retail price fixing and allocating customers among distributors and was prohibited from misrepresenting the amount of profit, earnings or sales its distributors are likely to achieve with the business. Amway was ordered to accompany any such statements with the actual averages per distributor, pointing out that more than half of the distributors do not make any money, with the average distributor making less than $100 per month. The order was violated with a 1986 ad campaign, resulting in a $100,000 fine.

Studies of independent consumer watchdog agencies have shown that between 990 and 999 of 1000 participants in MLMs that use Amway-type pay plans in fact lose money. According to The Skeptic's Dictionary, "In the United States, the Federal Trade Commission requires Amway to label its products with the message that 54% of Amway recruits make nothing and the rest earn on average $65 a month."

=== Amway India ===
In September 2006, following a public complaint, Andhra Pradesh and Telangana state police (CID) initiated raids and seizures against Amway distributors in the state, and submitted a petition against them, claiming the company violated the Prize Chits and Money Circulation Schemes (Banning) Act. They shut down all corporate offices associated with the Amway organization including the offices of some Amway distributors. The enforcement said that the business model of the company is illegal. The Reserve Bank of India (RBI) had notified the police that Amway in India may be violating certain laws regarding a "money circulation scheme" and the IB Times article writes that "some say ... Amway is really more about making money from recruiting people to become distributors, as opposed to selling products". In 2008, the state government of Andhra Pradesh enacted a ban on Amway media advertisements.

On August 6, 2011, Kerala Police sealed the offices of Amway at Kozhikode, Kannur, Kochi, Kottayam, Thrissur, Kollam and Thiruvananthapuram following complaints. In November 2012, the Economic Offences Wing of Kerala Police conducted searches at the offices of Amway at Kozhikode, Thrissur and Kannur as part of its crackdown on money chain activities and closed down the firm's warehouses at these centres. Products valued at 21.4 million rupees (about US$400,000 at the time) were also seized. Later, Area manager of Amway, P. M. Rajkumar, who was arrested following searches was remanded in judicial custody for 14 days.

On May 27, 2013, Crime Branch officials of Kerala Police arrested William S. Pinckney, Managing Director & CEO of Amway India Enterprises along with two other directors of the company from Kozhikode. The three were arrested on charges of running a pyramid scheme. They were granted bail the next day and the business was unaffected. On June 8, 2013, Kozhikode Court lifted the freeze on Amway offices in Kerala. On May 26, 2014, Pinckney was arrested by Andhra Pradesh police on the basis of a consumer complaint that alleged unethical circulation of money by Amway. He was subsequently arrested in other criminal cases registered against him in the state on allegations of financial irregularities by the company. Pinckney was jailed for two months until being released on bail.

In 2017, a Chandigarh court framed charges, under Section 420 of the Indian Penal Code and the Prize Chits and Money Circulation Scheme (Banning) Act, against two directors of Amway India, William Scot Pinckney and Prithvai Raj Bijlani. This was based on a cheating case filed by eight complainants in 2002, following which the Economic Offences Wing had filed chargesheet in 2012. A revision plea moved by the two Amway officials against the framed charges was dismissed in 2018.

In April 2022, the Enforcement Directorate attached both movable and immovable assets of Amway India worth ₹757 crore (US$79 million) including the firm's factory in Dindigul along with bank accounts under the Prevention of Money Laundering Act (PMLA).

=== U.S. class action settlement ===
On November 3, 2010, Amway announced that it had agreed to pay $56 million—$34 million in cash and $22 million in products—to settle a class action that had been filed in Federal District Court in California in 2007. The class action, which had been brought against Quixtar and several of its top-level distributors, alleged fraud, racketeering, and that the defendants operated as an illegal pyramid scheme.

Amway, while noting that the settlement is not an admission of wrongdoing or liability, acknowledged that it had made changes to its business operations as a result of the lawsuit. The settlement is subject to approval by the court, which was expected in early 2011. The economic value of the settlement, including the changes Amway made to its business model, totals $100 million.

=== Lobbying for deregulation ===
The DeVoses supported an amendment to the US House of Representatives' omnibus Financial Services and General Government Appropriations bill for fiscal year 2018 by US Representative John Moolenaar that would have limited the ability of the FTC to investigate whether MLMs are pyramid schemes. The amendment would have barred the Treasury Department, the Justice Department, the Small Business Administration, the Securities and Exchange Commission, the FTC, or any other agencies from using any monies to take enforcement actions against pyramid operations for the fiscal year. It also adopted provisions from H.R. 3409, the so-called "Anti-Pyramid Scheme Promotion Act of 2016", which would blur the lines between legitimate MLM activity and pyramid schemes established under the original 1979 FTC case by deeming sales made to people inside the company as sales to an "ultimate user," thus erasing the key distinction made in the ruling between sales to actual consumers of a product and sales made to members of the MLM network as part of recruitment of members or to qualify for commissions. The amendment was opposed by a coalition of consumer interest groups including Consumer Action, the Consumer Federation of America, Consumers Union (the publisher of Consumer Reports magazine), Consumer Watchdog, the National Consumers League, and the United States Public Interest Research Group (US PIRG), as well as Truth in Advertising (TINA.org) in its original incarnation.

== Other legal actions ==
=== Canadian tax fraud case ===
In 1982, Amway co-founders, Richard M. DeVos and Jay Van Andel, along with Amway's executive vice president for corporate services, William J. Discher Jr., were indicted in Canada on several criminal charges, including allegations that they underreported the value of goods brought into the country and had defrauded the Canadian government of more than $28 million from 1965 to 1980. The charges were dropped in 1983 after Amway and its Canadian subsidiary pleaded guilty to criminal customs fraud charges. The companies paid a fine of $25 million CAD, the largest fine ever imposed in Canada at the time. In 1989, the company settled the outstanding customs duties for $45 million CAD.

=== RIAA lawsuit ===
The Recording Industry Association of America (RIAA), as part of its anti-piracy efforts, sued Amway and several distributors in 1996, alleging that copyrighted music was used on "highly profitable" training videotapes. Amway denied wrongdoing, blaming the case on a misunderstanding by distributors, and settled the case out of court for $9 million.

=== Amway UK ===
In 2007, Amway's operations were halted in the United Kingdom and Ireland following a yearlong investigation by the UK Department of Trade and Industry, which moved to have Amway banned on the basis that the company had employed deceptive marketing, presented inflated earnings estimates, and lured distributors into buying bogus "motivation and training" tools. In 2008, a UK judge dismissed government claims against Amway's operations, saying major reforms in the prior year (which included banning non-Amway-approved motivational events and materials) had fixed company faults that favoured selling training materials over products and misrepresented earnings. However, the judge also expressed his belief that Amway allowed "misrepresentations" of its business by independent sellers in years past and failed to act decisively against the misrepresentations.

=== Welcome to Life (Poland) ===
In 1997, Amway Poland and Network TwentyOne separately sued the makers of a Polish film, Welcome to Life (Polish: Witajcie w życiu), for defamation and copyright violations. Henryk Dederko (the director) and producer were later acquitted on the charge of disseminating false information. The film, banned for 12 years, was one of the highly anticipated movies of 2009's Warsaw Film Festival and was dubbed by the promoters as a "scary movie about brainwashing" It was said to depict hard-sell "pep rallies", and to include statements from distributors that meetings had a similar tone to meetings of the Communist Party before it lost power in Poland. Methods of recruitment that confusingly resembled those of a sect were also described. A bestseller on the local video black market, the film was banned while the suit proceeded.

In 2001 a regional court ruled in favor of Network 21; however, in 2004 the Warsaw Regional Court dismissed Amway's civil lawsuit. On appeal Amway won the case and the producers were ordered to pay a fine to a children's charity and publish a public apology. As of 2009 the film was still banned due to an ongoing case brought by "private individuals" ridiculed in the film.

On December 18, 2012, the court ruled that film can be screened, but the makers have to remove "untrue information", as the screen near the end of the movie stated that 30% of company income is generated by sales of training materials and that the vast majority of its profits are shared only by the tiny fraction of top distributors. This is not the only court case, so the film is still banned on other grounds.

=== Dr. Phil and Shape Up ===
In March 2004, TV personality Phil McGraw (a.k.a. Dr. Phil) pulled his "Shape Up" line of supplements off the market in the face of an investigation by the U.S. Federal Trade Commission (FTC). The supplements were manufactured by CSA Nutraceuticals, a subsidiary of Alticor's Access Business Group. The FTC later dropped the probe, but in October 2005 a class-action lawsuit was filed against McGraw by several people who used the products and claimed that the supplements, which cost $120 per month, did not stimulate weight loss. In September 2006, a $10.5 million settlement was reached, in which Alticor agreed to provide $4.5 million in cash and $6 million in Nutrilite products to disgruntled users of Shape Up.

=== Procter & Gamble ===
Some Amway distributors spread an urban legend that the old Procter & Gamble service mark was a Satanic symbol or that the CEO of Procter & Gamble is a practicing Satanist. (In some variants of the story, it is also claimed that the CEO of Procter & Gamble donated "satanic tithes" to the Church of Satan.) Procter & Gamble alleged that several Amway distributors were behind a resurgence of the story in the 1990s and sued several independent Amway distributors and the company for defamation and slander. The distributors had used Amway's Amvox voice messaging service to send the rumor to their downline distributors in April 1995. By 2003, after more than a decade of lawsuits in multiple states, all allegations against Amway and Amway distributors had been dismissed. In October 2005, a Utah appeals court reversed part of the decision dismissing the case against the four Amway distributors, and remanded it to the lower court for further proceedings. In the lawsuit against the four former Amway distributors, Procter & Gamble was awarded $19.25 million by a U.S. District Court jury in Salt Lake City on March 20, 2007. On November 24, 2008, the case was officially settled. "It's hard to imagine they'd pursue it this long, especially after all the retractions we put out," said distributor Randy Haugen, a 53-year-old Ogden, Utah, businessman who maintained P&G was never able to show how it was harmed by the rumors. "We are stunned. All of us."

=== Regulatory violations in Vietnam ===
In January 2017, the Vietnam Ministry of Industry and Trade determined that Amway Vietnam had violated federal regulations by engaging in unauthorized multi-level marketing.

== Other issues ==
=== Cultism ===
Some Amway distributor groups have been accused of using "cult-like" tactics to attract new distributors and keep them involved and committed. Allegations include resemblance to a Big Brother organization with a paranoid attitude toward insiders critical of the organization, seminars and rallies resembling religious revival meetings, and enormous involvement of distributors despite minimal incomes. An examination of the 1979–1980 tax records in the state of Wisconsin showed that the Direct Distributors reported a net loss of $918 on average.

=== Dateline NBC ===
In 2004, Dateline NBC featured a critical report based on a yearlong undercover investigation of business practices of Quixtar. The report noted that the average distributor makes only about $1,400 per year and that many of the "high level distributors singing the praises of Quixtar" are actually "making most of their money by selling motivational books, tapes and seminars; not Quixtar's cosmetics, soaps, and electronics":

In fact, about twenty high level distributors are part of an exclusive club; one that those hundreds of thousands of other distributors don't get to join. For years only a privileged few, including Bill Britt, have run hugely profitable businesses selling all those books, tapes and seminars; things the rank and file distributors can't sell themselves but, are told over and over again, they need to buy in order to succeed.

The program said that a Quixtar recruiter featured in the report made misleading and inconsistent statements about Quixtar earnings during a recruitment meeting and had an outstanding arrest warrant for cocaine possession from the mid-90s.

== See also ==
- List of multi-level marketing companies
- Morrison v. Amway Corp.

== Books ==
- American Victory: The Real Story of Today's Amway, published April 1997 by Chapel & Croft Publishing; ISBN 0-9645171-6-7
- Amway: The Cult of Free Enterprise, published December 1, 1985, by South End Press; ISBN 0-9648795-1-4
- Amway Forever: The Amazing Story of a Global Business Phenomenon (Archived November 12, 2022, at the Wayback Machine), published August 2011 by John Wiley & Sons; ISBN 978-0-470-48821-8
- Amway: The True Story of the Company That Transformed the Lives of Millions, published September 1, 1999, by Berkley Publishing Group; ISBN 0-425-17040-3
- An Enterprising Life, published 1998 by HarperCollins; ISBN 0-88730-997-6
- An Uncommon Freedom: The Amway Experience and Why It Grows, published 1982 by Revell; ISBN 978-0800713058
- Commitment to excellence: The Remarkable Amway Story, published 1986 by Benjamin; ISBN 0-87502-136-0
- Compassionate Capitalism: People Helping People Help Themselves, published September 1994 by Penguin Books; ISBN 0-452-27051-0
- Empire of Freedom: The Amway Story and What It Means to You, published September 3, 1997, by Prima Lifestyles; ISBN 0-7615-1088-5
- How to Be Like Rich DeVos: Succeeding with Integrity in Business and Life, published 2004 by Health Communications, Inc; ISBN 0-7573-0158-4
- Merchants of Deception: An Insider's Chilling Look at the Worldwide, Multi-Billion Dollar Conspiracy of Lies That Is Amway and Its Motivational Organizations, published 2009 by BookSurge Publishing; ISBN 978-1-4392-4715-0
- The First Eleven: The Growth of Amway in Britain Through the Lives of Its Local Heroes, published 1984 by AM Publishing; ISBN 0-9509593-0-8
- Promises to Keep: The Amway Phenomenon and How It Works, published 1986 by Berkley Books; ISBN 0-425-09856-7
- The Direct Selling Revolution: Understanding the Growth of the Amway Corporation, published 1993 by WileyBlackwell; ISBN 978-0-631-19229-9
- The Possible Dream: A Candid Look At Amway, published 1977 by Revell; ISBN 0-8007-0857-1
- Profiles of the American Dream: Rich DeVos and Jay Van Andel and the Remarkable Beginnings of Amway, 1997 by Premiere Films
