= Multi-level marketing =

Controversial marketing strategy

Multi-level marketing (MLM), also called network marketing or pyramid selling, is a controversial and sometimes illegal marketing strategy for the sale of products or services in which the revenue of the MLM company is derived from a non-salaried workforce selling the company's products or services, while the earnings of the participants are derived from a binary compensation commission system.

In multi-level marketing, the compensation plan usually pays out to participants from two revenue streams. The first is based on a sales commission from directly selling the product or service. The second is paid out from commissions based on other sellers whom the participant has recruited. In the organizational hierarchy of MLM companies, recruited participants (as well as those whom the recruit recruits) are referred to as one's downline distributors. MLM salespeople are, therefore, expected to sell products directly to consumers by means of relationship referrals and word of mouth marketing. More importantly, they also are incentivized to recruit others to join the company's distribution chain as fellow salespeople.

According to a study of 350 MLM companies in the United States, at least 99% of recruits lose money. Nonetheless, MLM companies function because downline participants are encouraged to hold onto the belief that they can achieve large returns, while the statistical improbability of this is de-emphasized. MLM companies have been made illegal or otherwise strictly regulated in some jurisdictions as merely variations of the traditional pyramid scheme.

== Business model ==
=== Setup ===
A typical multi-level marketing tree structure. The blue individual at the top will receive compensation from the sales of the downline red members.

Independent non-salaried participants, referred to as distributors (variously called "associates", "independent business owners", "independent agents", "affiliates", etc.), are authorized to distribute the company's products or services. They are awarded their own immediate retail profit from customers plus commission from the company, not downlines, through a multi-level marketing compensation plan, which is based upon the volume of products sold through their own sales efforts as well as that of their downline organization.

Independent distributors develop their organizations by either building an active consumer network, who buy direct from the company, or by recruiting a downline of independent distributors who also build a consumer network base, thereby expanding the overall organization.

The combined number of recruits from these cycles is the sales force, called the salesperson's "downline". This "downline" is the pyramid in MLM's multiple-level structure of compensation.

=== Participants ===
The overwhelming majority of MLM participants—99.6% of participants, according to one study—lose money. Indeed, the largest proportion of participants must operate at a net loss (after expenses are deducted) so that the few individuals in the uppermost level of the MLM pyramid can derive their significant earnings. Said earnings are then emphasized by the MLM company to all other participants to encourage their continued participation at a continuing financial loss.

=== Companies ===
Many MLM companies generate billions of dollars in annual revenue and hundreds of millions of dollars in annual profit. However, profits accrue to the detriment of most of the company's constituent workforce (the MLM participants). Only some of the profits are then shared with individual participants at the top of the MLM distributorship pyramid. The earnings of those top few participants are emphasized and championed at company seminars and conferences, thus creating the illusion that participants in the MLM can become financially successful. This is then advertised by the MLM company to recruit more distributors in the MLM with an unrealistic anticipation of earning margins which are in reality merely theoretical and statistically improbable.

Although an MLM company holds out those few top individual participants as evidence of how participation in the MLM could lead to success, the MLM business model depends on the failure of the overwhelming majority of all other participants, through the injecting of money from their own pockets, so that it can become the revenue and profit of the MLM company, of which the MLM company shares only a small proportion with a few individuals at the top of the MLM participant pyramid. Other than the few at the top, participants provide nothing more than their own financial loss for the company's own profit and the profit of the top few individual participants.

=== Financial independence ===
The main sales pitch of MLM companies to their participants and prospective participants is not the MLM company's products or services. The products or services are largely peripheral to the MLM model. Rather, the true sales pitch and emphasis is on a confidence given to participants of potential financial independence through participation in the MLM, luring with phrases like "the lifestyle you deserve" or "independent distributor". Erik German's memoir My Father's Dream documents the author's father's failures through "get-rich-quick schemes" such as Amway. The memoir illustrates the multi-level marketing sales principle known as "selling the dream".

Although the emphasis is always made on the potential of success and the positive life change that "might" or "could" (not "will" or "can") result, disclosure statements include disclaimers that they, as participants, should not rely on the earning results of other participants in the highest levels of the MLM participant pyramid as an indication of what they should expect to earn. MLM companies rarely emphasize the extreme likelihood of failure, or the extreme likelihood of financial loss, from participation in MLM.

== Comparisons to pyramid schemes ==
MLM companies have been made illegal in some jurisdictions as a mere variation of the traditional pyramid scheme, including in China. In jurisdictions where MLM companies have not been made illegal, many illegal pyramid schemes attempt to present themselves as MLM businesses. Given that the overwhelming majority of MLM participants cannot realistically make a net profit, let alone a significant net profit, but instead overwhelmingly operate at net losses, some sources have defined all MLM companies as a type of pyramid scheme, even if they have not been made illegal like traditional pyramid schemes through legislative statutes.

MLM companies are designed to make profit for the owners/shareholders of the company and a few individual participants at the top levels of the MLM pyramid of participants. According to the U.S. Federal Trade Commission (FTC), some MLM companies already constitute illegal pyramid schemes even by the narrower existing legislation, exploiting members of the organization.

=== Lawsuits ===
Companies that employ the MLM business model have often faced criticism and lawsuits. Legal claims against MLM companies cover a wide range of issues, including accusations that their operations closely resemble illegal pyramid schemes. Additionally, MLM companies have been accused of engaging in price fixing and participating in collusion and racketeering, often involving secret compensation deals that favor a few participants at the expense of others. Critics also point to the high initial costs for new members, such as purchasing a marketing kit and initial products, as a barrier to entry. Many MLMs emphasize the recruitment of new members over actual sales, particularly sales to individuals outside of the MLM. This focus on recruitment often pressures participants to buy and use the company's products themselves, and exploit their personal relationships for sales and recruiting.

Furthermore, MLMs are often scrutinized for having complex and exaggerated compensation schemes, making it difficult for most participants to earn significant income. False claims about the effectiveness of products are also commonly reported. Major revenue for the company, or its leading distributors, often comes from participant-attended conventions, training sessions, and sales of promotional materials, adding another layer of financial burden on members. Some MLM organizations have also been accused of using cult-like techniques to build enthusiasm and loyalty among their members, which has raised additional ethical concerns.

== Direct selling versus network marketing ==
"Network marketing" and "multi-level marketing" (MLM) have been described by author Dominique Xardel as being synonymous, with it being a type of direct selling. Some sources emphasize that multi-level marketing is merely one form of direct selling, rather than being direct selling. Other terms that are sometimes used to describe multi-level marketing include "word-of-mouth marketing", "interactive distribution", and "relationship marketing". Critics have argued that the use of these and other different terms and "buzzwords" is an effort to draw distinctions between multi-level marketing and illegal Ponzi schemes, chain letters, and consumer fraud scams—where none meaningfully exist.

The Direct Selling Association (DSA), a lobbying group for the MLM industry, reported that in 1990 only 25% of DSA members used the MLM business model. By 1999, this had grown to 77.3%. By 2009, 94.2% of DSA members were using MLM, accounting for 99.6% of sellers, and 97.1% of sales. Companies such as Avon, Aerus (formerly Electrolux USA), Tupperware, and Kirby were all originally single-level marketing companies, using that traditional and uncontroversial direct selling business model (distinct from MLM) to sell their goods. However, they later introduced multi-level compensation plans, becoming MLM companies. The DSA has approximately 200 members while it is estimated there are over 1,000 firms using multi-level marketing in the United States alone.

== History ==
The origin of multi-level marketing is often disputed, but multi-level marketing style businesses existed in the 1920s and the 1930s, such as the California Vitamin Company (later named Nutrilite) and the California Perfume Company (renamed "Avon Products").

== Income levels ==
Several sources have commented on the income level of specific MLM companies or MLM companies in general:

- The Times: "The Government investigation claims to have revealed that just 10% of Amway's agents in Britain make any profit, with less than one in ten selling a single item of the group's products."
- Eric Scheibeler, a high level "Emerald" Amway member: "UK Justice Norris found in 2008 that out of an IBO [Independent Business Owners] population of 33,000, 'only about 90 made sufficient incomes to cover the costs of actively building their business.' That's a 99.7 percent loss rate for investors."
- Newsweek: based on Mona Vie's own 2007 income disclosure statement "fewer than 1 percent qualified for commissions and of those, only 10 percent made more than $100 a week."
- Business Students Focus on Ethics: "In the USA, the average annual income from MLM for 90% MLM members is no more than US $5,000, which is far from being a sufficient means of making a living (San Lian Life Weekly 1998)"
- USA Today has had several articles:
  - "While earning potential varies by company and sales ability, DSA says the median annual income for those in direct sales is $2,400."
  - In an October 15, 2010, article, it was stated that documents of a MLM called Fortune Hi-Tech Marketing reveal that 30 percent of its representatives make no money and that 54 percent of the remaining 70 percent only make $93 a month, before costs. Fortune was under investigation by the Attorneys General of Texas, Kentucky, North Dakota, and North Carolina with Missouri, South Carolina, Illinois, and Florida following up complaints against the company. The FTC eventually stated that Fortune Hi-Tech Marketing was a pyramid scheme and that checks totaling more than $3.7 million were being mailed to the victims.
  - A February 10, 2011, article stated "It can be very difficult, if not impossible, for most individuals to make a lot of money through the direct sale of products to consumers. And big money is what recruiters often allude to in their pitches."
  - "Roland Whitsell, a former business professor who spent 40 years researching and teaching the pitfalls of multilevel marketing": "You'd be hard-pressed to find anyone making over $1.50 an hour, (t)he primary product is opportunity. The strongest, most powerful motivational force today is false hope."
- Based on the results of a 2018 poll conducted with 1,049 MLM sellers, the majority (60%) earned an average of less than $100 in sales over a five-year period, and 20% never made a single sale. The majority of sellers made less than 70 cents per hour. Nearly 32 percent of those polled acquired credit card debt to finance their MLM involvement.

== Legality and legitimacy ==
=== Bangladesh ===
In 2015, the Government of Bangladesh banned all types of domestic and foreign MLM trade in Bangladesh.

=== China ===
Multi-level marketing was first introduced to mainland China by American, Taiwanese, and Japanese companies following the reform and opening up of 1978. This rise in multi-level marketing's popularity coincided with economic uncertainty and a new shift towards individual consumerism. Multi-level marketing was banned on the mainland by the government in 1998, citing social, economic, and taxation issues. Further regulation "Prohibition of Chuanxiao" (where MLM is a type of Chuanxiao was enacted in 2005, clause 3 of Chapter 2 of the regulation states having downlines is illegal). O'Regan wrote 'With this regulation China makes clear that while Direct Sales is permitted in the mainland, Multi-Level Marketing is not'.

MLM companies have been made illegal in China as a mere variation of the traditional pyramid scheme and as disruptive to social and economic order. MLM companies have been trying to find ways around China's prohibitions, or have been developing other methods, such as direct sales, to take their products to China through retail operations. The Direct Sales Regulations limit direct selling to cosmetics, health food, sanitary products, bodybuilding equipment and kitchen utensils, and they require Chinese or foreign companies ("FIEs") who intend to engage into direct sale business in mainland China to apply for and obtain direct selling license from the Ministry of Commerce ("MOFCOM"). In 2016, there are 73 companies, including domestic and foreign companies, that have obtained the direct selling license. Some multi-level marketing sellers have circumvented this ban by establishing addresses and bank accounts in Hong Kong, where the practice is legal, while selling and recruiting on the mainland.

It was not until August 23, 2005, that the State Council promulgated rules that dealt specifically with direct sale operation- Administration of Direct Sales (entered into effect on December 1, 2005) and the Regulations for the Prohibition of Chuanxiao (entered into effect on November 1, 2005). When direct selling is allowed, it will only be permitted under the most stringent requirements, in order to ensure the operations are not pyramid schemes, MLM, or fly-by-night operations.

=== Philippines ===
The Department of Trade and Industry grants "seal of legitimacy" to MLM companies which it deems to be not engaging in a pyramid scheme. The seal however is not mandatory for MLM firms to operate in the Philippines.

=== Saudi Arabia ===
MLM is illegal in Saudi Arabia.

=== United States ===
MLM businesses operate in all 50 U.S. states. Businesses may use terms such as "affiliate marketing" or "home-based business franchising". Some scholars say that all MLM companies are essentially pyramid schemes, even if they are legal.

Utah has been named the "unofficial world capital of multi-level marketing and direct sales companies" and is home to at least 15 major MLMs, more MLMs per capita than any other state. The high population of members of the Church of Jesus Christ of Latter-day Saints, with many members having missionary training, philosophy of self-reliance, and traditional gender roles, have been seen by scholars as contributors to its prevalence in Utah. The initials MLM have often sardonically been referred to as "Mormons Losing Money" as a result.

The U.S. Federal Trade Commission (FTC) states: "Steer clear of multilevel marketing plans that pay commissions for recruiting new distributors. They're actually illegal pyramid schemes. Why is pyramiding dangerous? Because plans that pay commissions for recruiting new distributors inevitably collapse when no new distributors can be recruited. And when a plan collapses, most people—except perhaps those at the very top of the pyramid—end up empty-handed."

In a 2004 Staff Advisory letter to the Direct Selling Association, the FTC states:

Much has been made of the personal, or internal, consumption issue in recent years. In fact, the amount of internal consumption in any multi-level compensation business does not determine whether or not the FTC will consider the plan a pyramid scheme. The critical question for the FTC is whether the revenues that primarily support the commissions paid to all participants are generated from purchases of goods and services that are not simply incidental to the purchase of the right to participate in a money-making venture.

The Federal Trade Commission warns

Not all multilevel marketing plans are legitimate. Some are pyramid schemes. It's best not to get involved in plans where the money you make is based primarily on the number of distributors you recruit and your sales to them, rather than on your sales to people outside the plan who intend to use the products.

In re Amway Corp. (1979), the Federal Trade Commission indicated that multi-level marketing was not illegal per se in the United States. However, Amway was found guilty of price fixing (by effectively requiring "independent" distributors to sell at the same fixed price) and making exaggerated income claims. The FTC advises that multi-level marketing organizations with greater incentives for recruitment than product sales are to be viewed skeptically. The FTC also warns that the practice of getting commissions from recruiting new members is outlawed in most states as "pyramiding". In a settlement with the founders of Vemma, the FTC ordered their future businesses require that a majority of sales be made to the general public, and not oneself or other distributors.

Walter J. Carl stated in a 2004 Western Journal of Communication article that "MLM organizations have been described by some as cults (Butterfield, 1985), pyramid schemes (Fitzpatrick & Reynolds, 1997), or organizations rife with misleading, deceptive, and unethical behavior (Carter, 1999), such as the questionable use of evangelical discourse to promote the business (Höpfl & Maddrell, 1996), and the exploitation of personal relationships for financial gain (Fitzpatrick & Reynolds, 1997)". In China, volunteers working to rescue people from the schemes have been physically attacked.

MLM companies are also criticized for being unable to fulfill their promises for the majority of participants due to basic conflicts with Western cultural norms. There are even claims that the success rate for breaking even or even making money are far worse than other types of businesses: "The vast majority of MLM companies are recruiting MLM companies, in which participants must recruit aggressively to profit. Based on available data from the companies themselves, the loss rate for recruiting MLM companies is approximately 99.9%; i.e., 99.9% of participants lose money after subtracting all expenses, including purchases from the company." (By comparison, skeptic Brian Dunning points out that "only 97.14% of Las Vegas gamblers lose money .... .") In part, this is because encouraging recruits to further "recruit people to compete with [them]" leads to "market saturation." It has also been claimed "(b)y its very nature, MLM is completely devoid of any scientific foundations."

Because of the encouraging of recruits to further recruit their competitors, some people have even gone so far as to say at best modern MLM companies are nothing more than legalized pyramid schemes with one stating "Multi-level marketing companies have become an accepted and legally sanctioned form of pyramid scheme in the United States" while another states "Multi-Level Marketing, a form of Pyramid Scheme, is not necessarily fraudulent." In October 2010 it was reported that multi-level marketing companies were being investigated by a number of state attorneys general amid allegations that salespeople were primarily paid for recruiting and that more recent recruits cannot earn anything near what early entrants do. Industry critic Robert L. FitzPatrick has called multi-level marketing "the Main Street bubble" that will eventually burst.

== Religious views ==
=== Islam ===
Many Islamic jurists and religious bodies, including Permanent Committee for Scholarly Research and Ifta of Saudi Arabia, have considered MLM trade to be prohibited (haram). They argue that MLM trade involves deceiving others into participating, and the transaction bears resemblance to both riba and gharar.

== See also ==
- Binary option
- Destiny Group
- List of multi-level marketing companies
- Saradha Group financial scandal
- Tiens
