= List of schools in the Roman Catholic Archdiocese of Detroit =

There are 25 Catholic high schools in the Detroit area as of 2015. 24 of those schools belong to the Archdiocese of Detroit.

The current Catholic high schools in the Archdiocese of Detroit are from Genesee County, Macomb County, Monroe County, Oakland County, St. Clair County, Washtenaw County, and Wayne County.

The Archdiocese of Detroit comprises six counties of Southeast Michigan: Lapeer, Macomb, Monroe, Oakland, St. Clair and Wayne. There currently are no Catholic high schools in Lapeer County.

A directory of Roman Catholic institutions from the 1960s listed 108 Catholic grade schools in Detroit, Hamtramck, and Highland Park. By 2005 suburban flight contributed to the decline of Catholic schools in the Detroit area. There were no Catholic schools left in Hamtramck by that year, and in the Detroit city limits there were 12. By 2017 there were four Catholic elementary schools in the city of Detroit. There are 103 Detroit-area high schools which have closed as of 2015.

== Department of Catholic Schools in Detroit ==
Under Archbishop Allen Vigneron, the Department of Catholic Schools oversees Catholic schools, guiding their mission to promote faith, academic excellence, and discipleship. The department leads the Unleashing Our Catholic Schools initiative, aimed at strengthening Catholic identity, academic quality, accessibility, and long-term sustainability. Its guidance aligns with Synod 16, Unleash the Gospel, and Unleashing Our Catholic Schools, emphasizing shared responsibility for Catholic schools among clergy, educators, parents, and the laity.

== K-12 schools ==
Oakland County

- Academy of the Sacred Heart (Bloomfield Township)
- Everest Academy and High School (Independence Township)
- Notre Dame Preparatory School and Marist Academy (Pontiac)
- Our Lady of the Lakes Catholic School (Waterford Township)
- Shrine Catholic Schools (Royal Oak)
- St Joseph School (Lake Orion)

== High schools ==
Macomb County

- Austin Catholic High School, Chesterfield (84 enrollment, co-ed)
- De La Salle Collegiate High School, Warren (786 enrollment, all boys)
- Regina High School, Warren (399 enrollment, all girls)

Monroe County

- St. Mary Catholic Central High School, Monroe (389 enrollment, co-ed)

Oakland County

- Bishop Foley Catholic High School, Madison Heights (321 enrollment, co-ed)
- Brother Rice High School, Bloomfield Hills (639 enrollment, all boys)
- Detroit Catholic Central High School, Novi (1,069 enrollment, all boys)
- Marian High School, Bloomfield Hills (481 enrollment, all girls)
- Mercy High School, Farmington Hills (817 enrollment, all girls)
- St. Catherine of Siena Academy, Wixom (178 enrollment, all girls)
- St. Mary's Preparatory, Orchard Lake (516 enrollment, co-ed)
- Shrine Catholic High School, Royal Oak, Michigan (256 enrollment, co-ed)

St. Clair County

- Cardinal Mooney Catholic High School, Marine City (153 enrollment, co-ed)

Wayne County

- Cabrini High School, Allen Park (435 enrollment, co-ed)
- Detroit Cristo Rey High School, Detroit (311 enrollment, co-ed)
- Divine Child High School, Dearborn (827 enrollment, co-ed)
- Gabriel Richard Catholic High School, Riverview (284 enrollment, co-ed)
- Loyola High School, Detroit (138 enrollment, all boys)
- University of Detroit Jesuit High School, Detroit (743 enrollment, all boys)

Note: All enrollment data is as of the 2015–16 school year.

=== Former high schools ===
Macomb County

- Anchor Bay Catholic High School/St. Mary High School, New Baltimore (closed 1970)
- Immaculate Conception High School, Warren (closed 2008)
- Sacred Heart High School, Roseville (closed 1971)
- St. Anne High School, Warren Michigan (closed 1988)
- St. Augustine High School, Richmond (closed 1968)
- St. Clement High School, Center Line (closed 2005)
- St. Gertrude High School, St. Clair Shores (closed 1971)
- St. Lawrence High School, Utica (closed 1971)
- St. Louis High School, Mount Clemens (closed 1970)
- St. Mary High School, Mount Clemens (closed 1970)

Monroe County

- Catholic Central High School, Monroe (closed 1986)
- St. Mary Academy, Monroe (closed 1986)

Oakland County

- St. Frederick High School, Pontiac (closed 1967)
- St. James High School, Ferndale (closed 1971)
- St. Mary High School, Royal Oak (closed 1985)
- St. Michael High School, Pontiac (closed 1967)
- Oakland Catholic High School, Pontiac (closed 1994)
- Our Lady of Sorrows High School, Farmington (closed 1971)
- Pontiac Catholic High School, Pontiac (closed 1988)

St. Clair County

- Holy Cross High School, Marine City (closed 1990)
- Port Huron Catholic High School, Port Huron (closed 1971)
- St. Stephen High School, Port Huron (closed 1964)

Wayne County

- Academy of the Sacred Heart, Grosse Pointe Farms (closed 1969)
- All Saints High School, Detroit (closed 1970)
- Annunciation High School, Detroit (closed 1967)
- Aquinas High School, Southgate (closed 2000)
- Austin Catholic Preparatory School, Detroit (closed 1978)
- Benedictine High School, Detroit (closed 2004)
- Bishop Borgess High School, Redford (closed 2005)
- Bishop Gallagher High School, Harper Woods (closed 2002)
- Blessed Sacrament Cathedral High School, Detroit (closed 1958)
- Cathedral Central High School, Detroit (closed 1970)
- Dominican High School, Detroit (closed 2006)
- East Catholic High School, Detroit (closed 2005)
- Felician Academy, Detroit (closed 1967)
- Girls Catholic Central High School, Detroit (closed 1969)
- Guardian Angels High School, Detroit (closed 1939)
- Holy Redeemer High School, Detroit (closed 2005)
- Immaculata High School, Detroit (closed 1983)
- Ladywood High School, Livonia (closed 2018)
- Nativity High School, Detroit (closed 1971)
- Notre Dame High School (closed 2005)
- Our Lady Help of Christians, Detroit (closed 1925)
- Our Lady of Lourdes High School, River Rouge (closed 1974)
- Our Lady of Mount Carmel High School, Wyandotte (closed 2011)
- Our Lady of the Rosary High School, Detroit (closed 1960)
- Our Lady Star of the Sea High School, Grosse Pointe Woods (closed 1993)
- Patronage of St. Joseph High School, Detroit (closed 1968)
- Rosary High School, Detroit (closed 1974)
- Sacred Heart High School, Dearborn (closed 1975)
- Sacred Heart Seminary High School, Detroit (closed 1957)
- St. Agatha High School, Redford (closed 2003)
- St. Agnes High School, Detroit (closed 1967)
- St. Alphonsus High School, Dearborn (closed 2003)
- St. Ambrose High School, Grosse Pointe Park (closed 1972)
- St. Andrew High School, Detroit (closed 1983)
- St. Anthony High School, Detroit (closed 1969)
- St. Augustine High School, Detroit (closed 1966)
- St. Benedict High School, Highland Park (closed 1967)
- St. Bernard High School, Detroit (closed 1966)
- St. Casimir High School, Detroit (closed 1969)
- St. Catherine High School, Detroit (closed 1967)
- St. Cecilia High School, Detroit (closed 1968)
- St. Charles High School, Detroit (closed 1969)
- SS. Cyril and Methodius High School, Detroit (closed 1971)
- St. David High School, Detroit (closed 1989)
- St. Elizabeth High School, Detroit (closed 1969)
- St. Florian High School, Hamtramck (closed 2002)
- St. Francis de Sales High School, Detroit (closed 1971)
- St. Francis Xavier High School, Ecorse (closed 1969)
- St. Gabriel High School, Detroit (closed 1970)
- St. Gertrude High School, St. Clair Shores (closed 1971)
- St. Gregory High School, Detroit (closed 1969)
- St. Hedwig High School, Detroit (closed 1990)
- St. Henry High School, Lincoln Park (closed 1939)
- St. Josaphat High School, Detroit (closed 1960)
- St. Joseph High School, Detroit (closed 1964)
- St. Katharine Drexel, Redford (closed 2004)
- St. Ladislaus High School, Hamtramck (closed 1981)
- St. Leo High School, Detroit (closed 1970)
- St. Martin de Porres High School, Detroit (closed 2005)
- St. Martin of Tours, Detroit (closed 1970)
- St. Mary High School, Wayne (closed 1971)
- St. Mary of Redford High School, Detroit (closed 1993)
- St. Marys Commercial High School, Detroit (closing not ascertained)
- St. Norbert High School, Inkster (closed 1971)
- St. Patrick High School, Wyandotte (closed 1968)
- St. Paul High School, Grosse Pointe Farms (closed 1971)
- St. Philip Neri High School, Detroit (closed 1970)
- St. Rita High School, Detroit (closed 1972)
- St. Rose of Lima High School, Detroit (closed 1972)
- St. Scholastica, Detroit (closed 2010)
- St. Stanislaus High School, Detroit (closed 1973)
- St. Theresa of Avila High School, Detroit (closed 1967)
- St. Thomas the Apostle High School, Detroit (closed 1969)
- St. Vincent de Paul High School, Detroit (closed 1971)
- Salesian High School, Detroit (closed 1970)
- Servite High School, Detroit (closed 1987)
- Sweetest Heart of Mary High School, Detroit (closed 1964)
- Trinity Catholic High School, Harper Woods (closed 2005)
- Visitation High School, Detroit (closed 1967)

== Elementary and K-8 schools ==
Lapeer County

- Bishop Kelley Catholic School (Lapeer)

Macomb County

- Immaculate Conception Schools (Warren)
- St. Angela School (Roseville)
- St. Anne Catholic School (Warren) - established in 1949
- St. Augustine Catholic School (Richmond)
- St. Germaine Catholic School (St. Clair Shores) - Established in 1964
- St. Isaac Jogues Catholic School (St. Clair Shores) - established in 1956
- St. Joan of Arc School (St. Clair Shores)
- St. Lawrence Catholic School (Utica) - opened in 1931
- St. Mary Catholic School (Mount Clemens) - The school opened in 1870, and the current building was constructed in 1889.
- St. Thecla Catholic School (Clinton Township)

Monroe County

- Monroe Catholic Elementary Schools (Monroe) - The administrative grouping was established in 2012.
  - St. John the Baptist School - Established in 1917
  - St. Mary School - Established in 1846
  - St. Michael the Archangel School - Dedicated on September 7, 1919
- St. Charles Borromeo Catholic Academy (Newport)
- St. Joseph Catholic School (Erie)
- St. Patrick School (Carleton) - The first parish school was established in 1848, with a joint school and convent in 1867, and a dedicated school building in 1909 that was ruined by a May 30, 1926 fire. A replacement building was put there, with a second building established in 1955. The 1955 building houses kindergarten and grades 5–6, while the post-1926 building has grades 1–4.

Oakland County

- Guardian Angels Catholic School (Clawson)
- Holy Family Regional School (HFRS) - Consists of a grade PK-3 North Campus in Rochester and a 4-8 South Campus in Rochester Hills. As of 2020 it has about 110 employees and more than 850 students, giving it the highest enrollment of any grade school in the archdiocese. It opened on September 3, 1980 with an initial enrollment of 128, and unified into a single administration on August 30, 2001. The churches which designate HFRS as the parish school include: St. Andrew (Rochester), St. Irenaeus (Rochester Hills), St. John Fisher Chapel (Auburn Hills), St. Mary of the Hills (Rochester Hills), and Sacred Heart of the Hills (Auburn Hills). The first two sponsored the school from the beginning and the other three joined later, with Sacred Heart being the final one.
- Holy Name Catholic School (Birmingham)
- Our Lady of Refuge School (Orchard Lake) - established in 1953
- Our Lady of Sorrows School (Farmington) - established in 1935
- Our Lady of Victory School (Northville) - The church established the school in 1950. The first facility, which opened in 1952, had four rooms. An addition with four classrooms and an office was installed for $85,000 in 1961. An additional two classrooms and a connecting structure to the worship facility were added in 1985. The current 19 classroom facility opened in 2006. As of 2020 the school has over 450 students.
- Our Lady Queen of Martyrs School (Beverly Hills) - Its campus has 9 acres (3.6 ha) of area.
- St. Fabian School (Farmington Hills)
- St. Hugo of the Hills Parish School (Bloomfield Hills) - established in 1940
- St. Joseph Catholic School (Orion Township) - It opened in September 1952. Initially 175 students were present.
- St. Mary Catholic School (Royal Oak) - As of 2020 it had 117 students in preschool and 220 students in other grades.
- St. Patrick Catholic School (White Lake)
- St. Regis Catholic School (Bloomfield Township)
- St. William Catholic School (Walled Lake) - The operating church's service area includes Walled Lake, Wixom, and sections of Commerce Township, Novi, and West Bloomfield.

St. Clair County

- Holy Cross Catholic School (Marine City)
- Immaculate Conception Elementary School (Fair Haven, Ira Township) - A fire destroyed the school and the rest of the church complex on August 26, 1917; these building were rebuilt, with the school having a four room building. Its current building opened in May 1959. A reduction in funding from the state of Michigan caused the school to close in 1971 but it opened again in fall 1976.
- St. Edward on the Lake School (Lakeport)
- St. Mary/McCormick Catholic Academy (Port Huron) - established in October 2007 by the merger of St. Mary Academy and McCormick Catholic Academy
- St. Mary's School (St. Clair) - scheduled to close in spring 2020

Wayne County
- In Detroit

- Christ the King Elementary School (Northwest Detroit) - Established in 1938
- Gesu Catholic School - "Gesu" is the Italian name for Jesus. Established in 1925, it was initially headed by clergy of the Sisters, Servants of the Immaculate Heart of Mary. it had 1,600 students in the 1960s. By 2001 it began using non-clergy as principals. By 2017 had only 240 students. Patricia Montemurri, an employee of the Detroit Free Press, wrote the book Detroit Gesu Catholic Church and School.
- Holy Redeemer Grade School (Mexicantown) - Established in 1882
- Most Holy Trinity School (Corktown)

- Outside of Detroit

- All Saints Catholic School (Canton) - It is the parish school of these churches: Resurrection, St. John Neumann, Saint Kenneth, and St. Thomas à Becket. The school opened in 1997 and was named after a previous Catholic school in Detroit. It was the archdiocese's first new Catholic school in the post-1964 period.
- Divine Child Elementary School (Dearborn) - The school was established in 1953. Its initial enrollment count was 280.
- Our Lady of Good Counsel School (Plymouth)
- Our Lady Star of the Sea School (Grosse Pointe Woods) - It first opened in 1958. When Our Lady Star of the Sea High School closed, the middle school began using the building.
- Sacred Heart School (Dearborn)
- St. Anselm School (Dearborn Heights) - established in 1955
- St. Clare of Montefalco School (Grosse Pointe Park)
- St. Edith Catholic School (Livonia)
- St. Frances Cabrini Grade School a.k.a. Cabrini Elementary and Middle School (Allen Park)
- St. John Paul II Classical Catholic School (Lincoln Park)
- St. Joseph Catholic School (Trenton) - It opened in February 1948, with the school renovated in 1999.
- St. Linus Catholic School (Dearborn Heights)
- St. Paul Catholic School (Grosse Pointe Farms) - The St. Paul Church opened the school on September 6, 1927 after deciding to open the school one year earlier. The kindergarten and preschool opened in 1975 and 1993, respectively.
- St. Michael the Archangel School (Livonia) - The school began on September 21, 1942, and the building used for the school had a second story installed after the archdiocese granted permission for this on November 9, 1943. The addition was installed from January to May 1944. There were 345 students for the 1944-1945 school year. On September 24, 1997 construction began for a new addition with a cost of $3.4 million. Construction finished before September 8, 1998, with dedication on October 11 of that year. The addition included a cafeteria, a library, a gymnasium, a computer lab, and six classrooms.
- St. Pius X Catholic School (Southgate) - The groundbreaking for the school building, then with eight rooms, occurred on August 13, 1953. The school itself opened in September 1950. The new building was dedicated on September 15, 1954 and officially opened that year. The school was originally known as St. Pius V Catholic School, a name which differed from that of its parish, but the two names were harmonized in 1974 as some people were unaware the two were connected.
- St. Stephen Catholic School (New Boston)
- St. Valentine School (Redford)

=== Former K-8, middle, and elementary schools ===
Macomb County

- St. Clement Catholic School (Center Line) - It was established in 1857. It had 110 students in the 2009-2010 year, and then 12 teachers and 89 students in its final year, 2010-2011. The parish decided to close the school as a parish takes a greater share of the costs if the number of students is under 100.
- St. Veronica School (Eastpointe)

Monroe County

- St. Anthony School (Temperance) - Its service area included Bedford, Ida, Summerfield, and Whiteford. - opened in 1944

Oakland County

- Lady of La Salette School (Berkley) - established in 1943. Initially 100 students attended. Beginning in 1947, the school building opened in three phases, with completion in 1953. In the 1960s it had over 1,000 students, its highest number ever. From the 2008-2009 school year until the 2012-2013 school year the student body numbers declined by 47%, with the final student count at 73. It closed in 2013. There was a proposal to convert the building into apartments, but the Berkley city council rejected it in 2018.
- St. Bede Catholic School (Southfield)
- St. Dennis School (Royal Oak) - Closed in 2011
- St. Vincent Ferrer School (Madison Heights)

St. Clair County

- McCormick Catholic Academy (Port Huron) Established in 1992, it was merged into St. Mary/McCormick Catholic Academy in October 2007.
- St. Mary School (Port Huron) - Started as a grade 1-8 school in 1963, with grades 6-8 moved to McCormick in 1992. Merged into St. Mary/McCormick Catholic Academy in October 2007. Four classrooms were built into the St. Mary campus in preparation for the merger.

Wayne County
- In Detroit

- All Saints Catholic School - closed in 1970
- East Catholic Elementary School
  - Seven Mile Campus
  - The McDougall Campus closed in 2005
- Guardian Angels Elementary - Closed in 1987
- Immaculate Heart of Mary Elementary School
- Martyrs of Uganda Elementary Catholic Academy
- Our Lady of Guadalupe Middle School (girls' school) - It was established in August 2001. The idea was first proposed in 1996. The costs increased and the number of pupils lowered, so the school closed in 2009.
- Our Lady Queen of Angels Elementary School
- Precious Blood Elementary School
- Saints Christine and Gemma School
- St. Alfred Catholic School
- St. Bartholomew School It opened in 1928, with a new school dedicated in 1950.
- St. Casimir Elementary School
- St. Cecilia School
- St. Christopher School
- St. Cunegunda School - opened 1930, closed unknown year
- St. Luke and St. Brigid Elementary School
- SS Peter & Paul Elementary School (Westside)

- Outside Detroit

- Our Lady Queen of Apostles (Hamtramck) - In 1925 Our Lady Queen of Apostles had 1,316 students.
- St. Albert the Great (Dearborn Heights)
- St. Aloysius School (Romulus)
- St. Alphonsus Elementary School (Dearborn) - It closed in 2005.
- St. Benedict Elementary School (Highland Park) - It closed in 2005. Northpointe Academy, a charter school, opened in the former St. Benedict after parents attempted to keep the former St. Benedict open.
- St. Cyril of Jerusalem (Taylor). Merged with St. Paschal School to become Taylor Catholic School but closed in 2006.
- St. Damian Catholic School (Westland) - Closed in 2016
- St. Elizabeth School (Wyandotte) - Merged into Wyandotte Consolidated in 1970.
- St. Florian Elementary School (Hamtramck) - In 1925 2,217 students attended St. Florian, making it the largest Catholic elementary school in Hamtramck. One wing of its building also housed St. Florian High School. One of its buildings was later used by Hanley Charter school. In 2005 the archdiocese announced that St. Florian Elementary would close. After St. Florian Elementary's closing, no Catholic schools are located within the city limits of Hamtramck.
- St. Genevieve Catholic School (Livonia) - closed in 2016
- St. Joseph School (Wyandotte) - merged into Wyandotte Consolidated in 1970
- St. Ladislaus Elementary School (Hamtramck) - In 1925 St. Ladislaus had 1,540 students. In 1992 Dickinson West Elementary School opened in the former St. Ladislaus building.
- St. Mary Magdalen Elementary School (Melvindale) - closed in 2005
- St. Mel Elementary School (Dearborn Heights) - closed in 2005
- St. Patrick School (Wyandotte) - merged into Wyandotte Consolidated in 1970
- St. Raphael Catholic School (Garden City) - closed in 2016
- St. Sebastian Catholic School (Dearborn Heights) - established in the 1950s and closed in 2019
- St.Valentine Catholic School(Redford) - established in the 1950s and closed in 2026
- Wyandotte Consolidated Catholic School (Wyandotte) - Formed in 1970 from the merger of St. Elizabeth, St. Joseph, and St. Patrick Schools. Closed in 2011 after a downturn in the economy.

St. Cyprian Elementary (Riverview, mi) opened in 1958 as 1st-8th grad, it never had Kindergarten. Closed in the 2007 after steady decline of students over the decades. Had 49yrs in school service.

== Diocese of Lansing schools in the Catholic High School League ==
Genesee County, Lenawee County and Washtenaw County are part of the Diocese of Lansing. Some Catholic high schools located in those counties are listed below because they participate, or have participated, in the Detroit Catholic High School League in athletics, which is part of the Archdiocese of Detroit.

Washtenaw County

- Father Gabriel Richard High School, Ann Arbor (555 enrollment, co-ed; belongs to the Diocese of Lansing)

Former schools:

Genesee County

- Holy Rosary High School, Flint (closed 1992; belonged to the Diocese of Lansing)

Lenawee County

- Catholic Central High School, Adrian (closed 1969; belonged to the Diocese of Lansing)
- St. Joseph High School, Adrian (closed 1975; belonged to the Diocese of Lansing)
