= Catholic High School League =

High school sports conference

The Catholic High School League (CHSL) is a school athletic conference based in Detroit, Michigan, led by director Victor Michaels. Most member schools are also members of the Michigan High School Athletic Association (MHSAA), the governing body for Michigan scholastic sports, except for the five schools from Toledo, which are members of the Ohio High School Athletic Association. Unlike many similar leagues, the CHSL governs secondary, middle, and elementary sports for most of the parochial schools in the Detroit area. Most league schools are Catholic, but there are other religious denominations as well. Every school in the CHSL is a private school. In 2019, the CHSL council voted to rename the AB/ Division I/II championship to the Bishop division championship, and the CD/ Division III/IV championship to the Cardinal Division championship.

== Member schools ==
Catholic High School League
School	Location	Enrollment	Class	Nickname	Colors	Gender	Established
Cabrini High School	Allen Park, Wayne County	265	C	Monarchs	Blue & Gold	Coed	1960
Father Gabriel Richard High School	Ann Arbor, Washtenaw County	536	B	Fighting Irish	Green & White	Coed	1868
Greenhills School	Ann Arbor, Washtenaw County	318	C	Gryphons	Navy & Green	Coed	1969
Brother Rice High School	Bloomfield Twp, Oakland County	564	A	Warriors	Black & Orange	All-Boys	1960
Academy of the Sacred Heart	Bloomfield Twp, Oakland County	139	C	Gazelles	Navy & Gold	All-Girls	1851
Cranbrook-Kingswood	Bloomfield Hills, Oakland County	811	B	Cranes/Aardvarks	Blue & Green	Coed	1922
Marian High School	Bloomfield Twp, Oakland County	451	A	Mustangs	Blue & Gold	All-Girls	1959
Everest Collegiate	Clarkston, Oakland County	121	D	Mountaineers	Black & Gold	Coed	2008
Divine Child High School	Dearborn, Wayne County	878	A	Falcons	Red & Gray	Coed	1958
Detroit Catholic Central High School	Novi, Oakland County	1,012	A	Shamrocks	Blue & White	All-Boys	1928
Detroit Cristo Rey	Detroit, Wayne County	329	C	Wolves	Green & Gold	Coed	2008
Loyola High School	Detroit, Wayne County	136	C	Bulldogs	Blue & White	All-Boys	1993
University of Detroit Jesuit High School	Detroit, Wayne County	743	A	Cubs	Maroon & White	All-Boys	1877
Mercy High School	Farmington Hills, Oakland County	686	A	Marlins	Maroon & Gold	All-Girls	1945
University Liggett School	Grosse Pointe Woods, Wayne County	286	C	Knights	Red, White & Blue	Coed	1878
Austin Catholic High School	Chesterfield Twp, Macomb County	115	D	Crusaders	Navy & Silver	Coed	2011
Lutheran North High School	Macomb, Macomb County	574	B	Mustangs	Black & Gold	Coed	1972
Lumen Christi Catholic School	Jackson, Jackson County	302	C	Titans	green & Gold	Coed	1968
Bishop Foley Catholic High School	Madison Heights, Oakland County	316	C	Ventures	Black & Gold	Coed	1965
Cardinal Mooney Catholic High School	Marine City, St. Clair County	145	D	Cardinals	Black & Red	Coed	1990
St. Mary's Preparatory	Orchard Lake, Oakland County	826	A	Eaglets	Red & White	Coed	1885
Gabriel Richard Catholic High School	Riverview, Wayne County	313	C	Pioneers	Burgundy & White	Coed	1965
Shrine Catholic High School	Royal Oak, Oakland County	249	C	Knights	Blue & Gold	Coed	1941
Toledo Central Catholic	Toledo, Lucas County, Ohio	600	II	Fighting Irish	Scarlet & Grey	Coed	1920
Notre Dame Academy	Toledo, Lucas County, Ohio	627	I	Eagles	Navy & Gold	All-Girls	1904
St. Francis de Sales	Toledo, Lucas County, Ohio	546	II	Knights	Blue & Red	All-Boys	1955
St. John's Jesuit	Toledo, Lucas County, Ohio	479	II	Titans	Blue & Vegas Gold	All-Boys	1965
St. Ursula Academy	Toledo, Lucas County, Ohio	563	I	Arrows	Blue & Gold	All-Girls	1854
De La Salle High School	Warren, Macomb County	702	A	Pilots	Purple & Gold	All-Boys	1926
Regina High School	Warren, Macomb County	282	B	Saddlelites	Blue & White	All-Girls	1956
Our Lady of the Lakes High School	Waterford, Oakland County	100	D	Lakers	Blue & White	Coed	1960
West Bloomfield Frankel Jewish Academy	West Bloomfield Twp, Oakland County	147	D	Jaguars	Blue & White	Coed	2000
St. Catherine of Siena Academy	Wixom, Oakland County	266	B	Siena Stars	Purple & Gold	All-Girls	2008

== Sports ==
At the high school level, the league supports sixteen girls sports and fourteen boys sports.

Girls Sports: basketball, bowling, cheerleading, cross -country, field hockey, golf, ice hockey, lacrosse, pom-pon, ski, soccer, softball, swimming, tennis, track and volleyball.

Boys Sports: baseball, basketball, bowling, cross-country, football, golf, ice hockey, lacrosse, ski, soccer, swimming, tennis, track and wrestling.

== Girls CHSL Divisions ==
Divisional alignments may vary from sport to sport, depending upon the number of schools participating in the sport and the enrollment of those participating schools. Listed below are typical divisional alignments for a common sport, in this case girls basketball (as of April, 2015).

=== Central Division ===
- Bloomfield Hills Marian
- Dearborn Divine Child
- Farmington Hills Mercy
- Warren Regina

=== AA Division ===
- Allen Park Cabrini
- Ann Arbor Father Gabriel Richard
- Macomb Lutheran North
- Pontiac Notre Dame Preparatory
- Riverview Gabriel Richard

=== East Division ===
- Clarkston Everest Collegiate
- Bloomfield Hills Cranbrook-Kingswood
- Madison Heights Bishop Foley Catholic
- Marine City Cardinal Mooney Catholic
- Royal Oak Shrine Catholic
- Waterford Our Lady of the Lakes
- Wixom St. Catherine of Siena Academy

=== West Division ===
- Bloomfield Hills Academy of the Sacred Heart
- Detroit Cristo Rey
- Macomb Austin Catholic
- West Bloomfield Frankel Jewish Academy

== Boys CHSL Divisions ==
Divisional alignments may vary from sport to sport, depending upon the number of schools participating in the sport and the enrollment of those participating schools. Listed below are typical divisional alignments for a common sport, in this case boys basketball (as of April, 2015).

=== Central Division ===
- Bloomfield Hills Brother Rice
- Detroit Catholic Central
- University of Detroit Jesuit
- Orchard Lake St. Mary's Preparatory
- Warren De La Salle Collegiate

=== AA Division ===
- Ann Arbor Father Gabriel Richard
- Dearborn Divine Child
- Detroit Loyola
- Macomb Lutheran North
- Jackson Lumen Christi

=== Intersectional 1 Division ===
- Allen Park Cabrini
- Bloomfield Hills Cranbrook-Kingswood
- Madison Heights Bishop Foley Catholic
- Royal Oak Shrine Catholic
- Waterford Our Lady of the Lakes

=== Intersectional 2 Division ===
- Clarkston Everest Catholic
- Detroit Cristo Rey
- Macomb Austin Catholic
- Marine City Cardinal Mooney Catholic
- Riverview Gabriel Richard
- West Bloomfield Frankel Jewish Academy

== Former League Members (closed schools) ==
Catholic High School League
School	Location	Final Enrollment	Class	Nickname	Colors	Gender	Years
Academy of the Sacred Heart	Grosse Pointe Farms, Wayne County				Blue & White	All-Girls	1887-1969
All Saints High School	Detroit, Wayne County	68	C-D	Saints	Green & White	Coed	1922-1970
Anchor Bay Catholic High School	New Baltimore, Macomb County		D	Giants	Red & White		Closed 1970
Annunciation High School	Detroit, Wayne County		C	Cougars	Blue & White	Coed	1915-1967
Aquinas High School	Southgate, Wayne County	81	B-C	Raiders	Black & White	Coed	1966-2001
Austin Catholic Preparatory School	Detroit, Wayne County	427	A-B	Friars	Black & White	All-Boys	1952-1978
Benedictine High School	Detroit, Wayne County	149	B-C-D	Ravens	Black & White	Coed	1957-2004
Bishop Borgess High School	Redford, Wayne County	103	A-B-C-D	Spartans	Green & Gold	Coed	1966-2005
Bishop Gallagher High School	Harper Woods, Wayne County	163	A-B-C-D	Lancers	Blue & White	Coed	1962-2002
Blessed Sacrament Cathedral High School	Detroit, Wayne County						1907-1971
Cathedral High School	Detroit, Wayne County		A-B-C	Wildcats	Green & White	All-Boys	1953-1970
Catholic Central High School	Adrian, Lenawee County		C-D	Irish	Blue & White	Coed	Closed 1969
Covenant High School	Redford, Wayne County		D	Spartans	Green & Gold	Coed	2005-2009
Dominican High School	Detroit, Wayne County	97	A-B-C-D	Ravens	Midnight Blue & Powder Blue	All-Girls	1940-2005
East Catholic High School	Detroit, Wayne County	117	C-D	Chargers	Green & White	Coed	1967-2005
Felician Academy	Detroit, Wayne County				Blue & Silver	All-Girls	1882-1967
Girls Catholic Central High School	Detroit, Wayne County				Navy & White	All-Girls	1927-1969
Holy Cross High School	Marine City, St. Clair County	49	C-D	Crusaders	Blue & White	Coed	Closed 1989
Holy Redeemer High School	Detroit, Wayne County	189	A-B-C-D	Lions	Purple & Gold	Coed	1882-2005
Holy Rosary High School	Flint, Genesee County	127	D	Wolverines	Blue & White	Coed	Closed 1992
Immaculata High School	Detroit, Wayne County			Blue Angels	Blue & White	All-Girls	1941-1983
Immaculate Conception High School	Warren, Macomb County	83	D	Bengals	Blue & White	Coed	1959-2008
Nativity High School	Detroit, Wayne County		B-C	Vikings	Black & Gold	Coed	1914-1971
Notre Dame High School	Harper Woods, Wayne County	295	A	Fightin' Irish	Green & White	All-Boys	1954-2005
Our Lady of Lourdes High School	River Rouge, Wayne County		B-C-D	Bears	Blue & White	Coed	1955-1974
Our Lady Help of Christians High School	Detroit, Wayne County						Closed 1925
Our Lady of Mount Carmel High School	Wyandotte, Wayne County	89	C-D	Comets	Red & White	Coed	1928-2011
Our Lady of Sorrows High School	Farmington, Oakland County		C	Lancers	Blue & White	Coed	Closed 1971
Our Lady Star of the Sea High School	Grosse Pointe Woods, Wayne County			Tunas	Blue & White	All-Girls	1959-1993
Our Lady of the Rosary High School	Detroit, Wayne County						Closed 1960
Patronage of St. Joseph High School	Detroit, Wayne County						1945-1969
Pontiac Catholic High School	Pontiac, Oakland County		B-C-D	Titans	Green & White	Coed	1967-1988
Port Huron Catholic High School	Port Huron, St. Clair County			Warriors	Maroon & Gold	Coed	1961-1971
Rosary High School	Detroit, Wayne County			Roses	Red & White	All-Girls	1956-1974
Sacred Heart High School	Dearborn, Wayne County		B-C	Shamrocks	Green & White	Coed	Closed 1975
Sacred Heart Seminary High School	Detroit, Wayne County			Marauders	Maroon & White	All-Boys	1924-1970
Sacred Heart High School	Roseville, Macomb County		B-C	Thorns	Red & White	Coed	1955-1971
Salesian High School	Detroit, Wayne County		A-B	Knights	Red & White	Coed	1955-1970
St. Agatha High School	Redford, Wayne County		C-D	Aggies	Green & White	Coed	Closed 2003
St. Agnes High School	Detroit, Wayne County			Panthers	Black & Orange	All-Girls beginning in 1958	1918-1967
St. Alphonsus High School	Dearborn, Wayne County	99	B-C-D	Arrows	Blue & Yellow	Coed	Closed 2003
St. Ambrose High School	Grosse Pointe Park, Wayne County		B-C	Cavaliers	Maroon & White	Coed	1923-1972
St. Andrew High School	Detroit, Wayne County		B-C-D	Flyers	Red & White	Coed	1940-1983
St. Anne High School	Warren, Macomb County		D	Saints	Green & White	Coed	1965-1970
St. Anthony High School	Detroit, Wayne County		A-B	Teutons	Maroon & White	Coed	1918-1969
St. Augustine High School	Detroit, Wayne County					Coed	Closed 1966
St. Augustine High School	Richmond, Macomb County					Coed	Closed 1968
St. Bernard High School	Detroit, Wayne County		C-D	Ramblers	Blue & White	Coed	Closed 1966
St. Benedict High School	Highland Park, Wayne County		C-D	Ravens	Black & Gold	Coed	Closed 1967
St. Casimir High School	Detroit, Wayne County			Crescents	Red & White	Coed	1927-1969
St. Catherine High School	Detroit, Wayne County		B-C	Warriors	Black & Yellow	Coed	Closed 1967
St. Cecilia High School	Detroit, Wayne County		C	Fighting Irish	Green & Gold	Coed	1926-1967
St. Charles High School	Detroit, Wayne County		C-D	Dragons	Maroon & White	Coed	1912-1967
St. Clement High School	Center Line, Macomb County	134	B-C-D	Crusaders	Green & Gold	Coed	Closed 2005
St. Cyril High School	Detroit, Wayne County			Sharks	Red & White	Coed	1945-1971
St. David High School	Detroit, Wayne County		B-C	Aviators	Maroon & Gold	Coed	1956-1989
St. Elizabeth High School	Detroit, Wayne County		C	Sabres	Blue & White	Coed	Closed 1969
St. Florian High School	Hamtramck, Wayne County	113	B-C-D	Lancers	Red & White	Coed	1940-2002
St. Francis de Sales High School	Detroit, Wayne County		C	Monarchs	Blue & White	Coed	Closed 1971
St. Francis Xavier High School	Ecorse, Wayne County		C-D	Buccaneers	Blue & White	Coed	1924-1969
St. Frederick High School	Pontiac, Oakland County		C	Rams	Red & Black	Coed	Closed 1967
St. Gabriel High School	Detroit, Wayne County			Trumpeteers	Gold & White	Coed	Closed 1970
St. Gertrude High School	St. Clair Shores, Macomb County		C-D	Clippers	Maroon & Gold	Coed	Closed 1971
St. Gregory High School	Detroit, Wayne County		B-C-D	Cherokees	Red & White	Coed	Closed 1969
St. Hedwig High School	Detroit, Wayne County	150	B-C-D	Knights	Black & Yellow	Coed	1941-1990
St. Henry High School	Lincoln Park, Wayne County					Coed	Closed 1939
St. James High School	Ferndale, Oakland County		B-C	Dales	Red & White	Coed	Closed 1971
St. John High School	Ypsilanti, Washtenaw County		C-D	Crusaders	Blue & White	Coed	Closed 1969
St. Josaphat High School	Detroit, Wayne County				Blue & White	Coed	1915-1960
St. Joseph High School	Adrian, Lenawee County					Coed	Closed 1975
St. Joseph High School	Detroit, Wayne County		A-B	Blue Jays	Blue & White	Coed	1889-1964
St. Katharine Drexel High School	Redford, Wayne County		D	Aggies	Green & White	Coed	2003-2004
St. Ladislaus High School	Hamtramck, Wayne County		B-C-D	Greyhounds	Scarlet & Grey	Coed	Closed 1981
St. Lawrence High School	Utica, Macomb County		C-D	Mustangs	Blue & Yellow	Coed	Closed 1971
St. Leo High School	Detroit, Wayne County		C-D	Lions	Red & White	Coed	1892-1971
St. Louis High School	Mount Clemens, Macomb County		C-D	Muskrats	Green & Gold	Coed	1951-1970
St. Martin de Porres High School	Detroit, Wayne County	275	C-D	Eagles	Blue & Gold	Coed	Closed 2005
St. Martin of Tours High School	Detroit, Wayne County	221	C-D	Cadets	Blue & White	Coed	Closed 1970
St. Mary High School	Mount Clemens, Macomb County		B-C-D	Mountaineers	Blue & White	Coed	1911-1970
St. Mary High School	New Baltimore, Macomb County						Closed 1970
St. Mary High School	Royal Oak, Oakland County		C-D	Fighting Irish	Blue & White	Coed	Closed 1985
St. Mary High School	Wayne, Wayne County		C	Blue Knights	Blue & White	Coed	1948-1971
St. Mary of Redford High School	Detroit, Wayne County	119	B-C-D	Rustics	Blue & White	Coed	1925-1992
St. Marys Commercial High School	Detroit, Wayne County				Blue & Gold	All-Girls	
St. Michael High School	Pontiac, Oakland County		C	Shamrocks	Blue & White	Coed	Closed 1967
St. Norbert High School	Inkster, Wayne County			Shamrocks	Green & White	Coed	1971
St. Patrick High School	Wyandotte, Wayne County		B-C-D	Irish	Green & White	Coed	Closed 1968
St. Philip High School	Detroit, Wayne County		C-D	Red Raiders	Red & White	Coed	Closed 1970
St. Paul High School	Grosse Pointe Farms, Wayne County		C	Lakers	Red & White	Coed	1927-1971
St. Rita High School	Detroit, Wayne County		B-C	Vikings	Green & White	Coed	1928-1972
St. Rose High School	Detroit, Wayne County		C-D	Golden Bears	Blue & Gold	Coed	1924-1967
St. Stanislaus High School	Detroit, Wayne County		B-C-D	Broncos	Red & White	Coed	1928-1973
St. Stephen High School	Port Huron, St. Clair County		B-C-D	Hornets	Green & Yellow	Coed	1929-1964
St. Theresa of Avila High School	Detroit, Wayne County		B-C-D	Pirates	Black & Gold	Coed	Closed 1967
St. Thomas the Apostle High School	Detroit, Wayne County		C-D	Blue Streaks	Blue & White	Coed	Closed 1969
St. Vincent de Paul High School	Detroit, Wayne County		C-D	Gaels	Green & Gold	Coed	Closed 1971
Servite High School	Detroit, Wayne County	149	B-C-D	Panthers	Black & White	Coed	1949-1987
Sweetest Heart of Mary High School	Detroit, Wayne County			Hawks	Green & White	Coed	1890-1965
Trinity Catholic High School	Harper Woods, Wayne County	163	D	Lancers	Red & Blue	Coed	2002-2005
Visitation High School	Detroit, Wayne County		B-C	Eagles	Blue & Gold	Coed	1956-1967

Footnotes:

Monroe County

Catholic Central High School, Monroe (opened in 1944), and St. Mary Academy, Monroe (opened in 1846), became St. Mary Catholic Central High School in 1986 when the two schools merged.

Washtenaw County

Ann Arbor St. Thomas High School became Father Gabriel Richard High School in 1978.

Wayne County

Detroit Cristo Rey High School occupies the former Detroit Holy Redeemer High School building.

Our Lady of Mercy High School in Detroit moved to Farmington in 1965 and changed its name to Mercy High School that same year.

Redford St. Agatha High School became St. Katharine Drexel High School in 2003.

Redford Bishop Borgess High School closed in 2005 and became Redford Covenant High School which closed in 2009.

== Accomplishments ==
Since its founding in 1926, CHSL member schools have won nearly 300 state titles (through 2015).

Former Bloomfield Hills Brother Rice and Royal Oak Shrine head coach Al Fracassa holds the state record for all-time football coaching wins with 430 while Waterford Our Lady of the Lakes' former head coach Mike Boyd is third at 361 wins (all at one school), and current Detroit Catholic Central head coach Tom Mach is fourth with 348 wins (as of 2014).

Current Warren Regina head coach Diane Laffey is the winningest coach in MHSAA softball history with 1,118 victories through the 2015 season. She also is the third winningest head coach in MHSAA girls basketball with 619 wins as of 2015.

In boys basketball, Orchard Lake St. Mary's is the state's second-winningest all-time program with 1,250 wins (as of 2009).

Bloomfield Hills Cranbrook-Kingswood has the most ever boys ice hockey state championships with seventeen (as of 2015), and the most boys tennis state titles with eighteen (as of 2015). Cranbrook-Kingswood also has sixteen girls tennis state championships, the most ever in that sport in Michigan history (as of 2015).

Detroit St. Martin de Porres holds the record for the most state titles in boys track with fifteen (as of 2015).

Madison Heights Bishop Foley holds the most girls soccer state titles in Michigan history with twelve (as of 2015).

Waterford Our Lady of the Lakes has the most softball state championships in Michigan history with eight (as of 2015).

Bloomfield Hills Brother Rice has won all but one boys lacrosse state championships in Division 1 since the sport started having state championships in 2005.

== Notable CHSL Alumni ==
Names of notable alumni are listed in descending order based on their respective year of high school graduation.

- Cassius Winston, Professional Basketball Player, University of Detroit Jesuit, 2016
- Joshua Gatt, Professional Soccer Player, Detroit Catholic Central, 2010
- Allen Robinson, Former NFL Player, Orchard Lake St. Mary's, 2010
- Dion Sims, Former NFL Player, Orchard Lake St. Mary's, 2009
- Ryan Riess, 2013 World Series of Poker Main Event Champion, Waterford Our Lady of the Lakes, 2008
- Greg Pateryn, NHL Player, Bloomfield Hills Brother Rice, 2008
- Mike Martin, NFL Player, Detroit Catholic Central, 2008
- DJ LeMahieu, MLB Player, Bloomfield Hills Brother Rice, 2007
- Brad Galli, WXYZ-TV Sports Reporter, Bloomfield Hills Brother Rice, 2007
- Doug Weight, Former NHL Player, Coach, and Executive, Harper Woods Notre Dame, 1989
- Kalin Lucas, Former NBA Player, Orchard Lake St. Mary's, 2007
- T. J. Lang, NFL Player, Bloomfield Hills Brother Rice, 2005
- Connor Barwin, NFL Player, University of Detroit Jesuit, 2005
- Morgan Trent, Former NFL Player, Orchard Lake St. Mary's, 2003
- Geoff Pope, Former NFL Player, University of Detroit Jesuit, 2002
- Braylon Edwards, Former NFL Player, Harper Woods Bishop Gallagher, 2001
- Grant Mason, Former NFL Player, Orchard Lake St. Mary's, 2001
- Matt Baker, Retired NFL Player, Bloomfield Hills Brother Rice, 2001
- Alex Shelley, Professional wrestler, Detroit Catholic Central, 2001
- Ben Blackwell, writer, drummer, co-founder of Third Man Records, Notre Dame High School (Harper Woods, Michigan), 2000
- Klint Kesto, State Representative (Michigan), Bloomfield Hills Brother Rice, 1999
- Kristen Bell, Actress, Royal Oak Shrine, 1998
- Mark Campbell, Former NFL Player, Madison Heights Bishop Foley, 1994
- Doug Brzezinski, Former NFL Player, Detroit Catholic Central, 1994
- Brooke Elliott, Actress, Riverview Gabriel Richard, 1993
- Kerry Zavagnin, Former MLS Player, Detroit Catholic Central, 1992
- Ron Rice, NFL Player, University of Detroit Jesuit, 1991
- Keegan-Michael Key, Actor and Comedian, Royal Oak Shrine, 1989
- Mike Peplowski, Former NBA Player, Warren De La Salle, 1988
- Scott Kowalkowski, Former NFL Player, Orchard Lake St. Mary's, 1987
- Tom Lewand, former Detroit Lions President, Royal Oak Shrine, 1987
- Craig Wolanin, Former NHL Player, Warren De La Salle, 1985
- Mike Lodish, Retired NFL Player, Bloomfield Hills Brother Rice, 1985
- Bob Kula, Retired NFL Player, Bloomfield Hills Brother Rice, 1985
- B. J. Armstrong, Retired NBA Player, Bloomfield Hills Brother Rice, 1985
- Gus Johnson, Sportscaster, University of Detroit Jesuit, 1985
- Mark Messner, Former NFL Player, Detroit Catholic Central, 1984
- Pat Shurmur, Former NFL Head Coach, Dearborn Divine Child, 1983
- Thaddeus McCotter, Former U.S. Congressman, Detroit Catholic Central, 1983
- Meg Mallon, Professional Golfer, Farmington Mercy, 1981
- Tom Jankiewicz, Screenwriter, Madison Heights Bishop Foley, 1981
- Steve Phillips, Former New York Mets General Manager, Warren De La Salle, 1981
- Thomas Sugrue, Historian, Bloomfield Hills Brother Rice, 1980
- Denis O'Hare, Actor, Bloomfield Hills Brother Rice, 1980
- Brian Brennan, NFL Player, Bloomfield Hills Brother Rice, 1980
- Mike Cox, Former Michigan Attorney General, Detroit Catholic Central, 1980
- Andy Dillon, Former Michigan Speaker of the House, Detroit Catholic Central, 1980
- Michealene Risley, Writer and Director, Madison Heights Bishop Foley, 1978
- Jim Paciorek, Former MLB Player, Orchard Lake St. Mary's, 1978
- Brian Zahara, Michigan Supreme Court Justice, Dearborn Divine Child, 1977
- Bill Sheridan, Former NFL Player, Warren De La Salle, 1977
- Chris Hansen, Former NBC Television News Reporter, Bloomfield Hills Brother Rice, 1977
- Chris Godfrey, Former NFL Player, Warren De La Salle, 1976
- Mike Duggan, Mayor of Detroit, Detroit Catholic Central, 1976
- Mike Bouchard, Oakland County (Michigan) Sheriff, Bloomfield Hills Brother Rice, 1974
- Tom LaGarde, Member of 1976 U.S. Olympic basketball team and retired NBA Player, Detroit Catholic Central, 1973
- Greg Collins, Actor and retired NFL Player, Bloomfield Hills Brother Rice, 1971
- Frank Tanana, Retired MLB Player, Detroit Catholic Central, 1971
- Joseph LoDuca, Music Composer, Warren De La Salle, 1970
- Bill Simpson, Former NFL Player, Royal Oak Shrine, 1970
- Mike Varty, Former NFL Player, Austin Catholic Preparatory, 1970
- Gary Danielson, Former NFL Player, Dearborn Divine Child, 1969
- Joe DeLamielleure, Former NFL Player, Center Line St. Clement, 1969
- Peter Leonard, Author, Bloomfield Hills Brother Rice, 1969
- David M. Lawson, United States Federal Judge, Bloomfield Hills Brother Rice, 1969
- Paul Seymour, Former NFL Player, Royal Oak Shrine, 1968
- Richard Tarnas, Author, University of Detroit Jesuit, 1968
- Lawrence Joseph, Poet, University of Detroit Jesuit, 1966
- J. Richard Fredericks, Former U.S. Ambassador to Switzerland and Liechtenstein, Bloomfield Hills Brother Rice, 1964
- Gerald McGowan, Former U.S. Ambassador to Portugal, Bloomfield Hills Brother Rice, 1964
- Bob King, United Auto Workers President, University of Detroit Jesuit, 1964
- Jim Seymour, Former NFL Player, Royal Oak Shrine, 1964
- James Tocco, internationally known concert pianist, Austin Catholic Preparatory School, 1961.
- William "Bill" Chmielewski, Former ABA Player, Detroit Holy Redeemer, 1960
- William B. Fitzgerald Jr., Majority Leader of the Senate, Michigan Legislature. Austin Catholic Preparatory School, 1960
- Michael Moriarty, Actor, University of Detroit Jesuit, 1959
- Michael Cavanagh, Michigan Supreme Court Justice, University of Detroit Jesuit, 1958
- Dave DeBusschere, player for the Chicago White Sox, Detroit Pistons, and New York Knicks, Austin Catholic Preparatory School, 1958
- L. Brooks Patterson, Oakland County, Michigan Executive, University of Detroit Jesuit, 1957
- Bruce Maher, Former NFL Player, University of Detroit Jesuit, 1955
- Greg Marx, Former NFL Player, Detroit Catholic Central, 1968
- J.P. McCarthy, WJR Radio Personality, Warren De La Salle, 1950
- William J. Pulte, Businessman, Warren De La Salle, 1950
- Adam Maida, Former Cardinal Archbishop Emeritus of Detroit, Orchard Lake St. Mary's, 1948
- Thomas E. Brennan, Former Chief Justice of the Michigan Supreme Court Detroit Catholic Central, 1947
- Manuel Moroun, Transportation Magnate, University of Detroit Jesuit, 1945
- Elmore Leonard, Former novelist and screenwriter, University of Detroit Jesuit, 1943
- John McCabe, Author, University of Detroit Jesuit, 1938
- Vince Banonis, Former NFL Player, Detroit Catholic Central, 1938
- Andy Farkas, Former NFL Player, University of Detroit Jesuit, 1934
- George D. O'Brien, Former U.S. Congressman, University of Detroit Jesuit, 1917
- Louis C. Rabaut, Former U.S. Congressman, University of Detroit Jesuit, 1905

== Girls' Basketball Championships ==
Girls' basketball championship facts:

- Since CHSL girls basketball championship games began being played in 1974, and through 2016, the Bloomfield Hills Marian Mustangs have won fifteen CHSL championships, the most of any school in league history.
- The Waterford Our Lady of the Lakes Lakers are second in league history with seven CHSL championships.
- The Livonia Ladywood Blazers, the Farmington Hills Mercy Marlins and the Detroit St. Martin de Porres Eagles are all tied for third with six championships each.

CHSL Girls Basketball Champions
Year	Division	Champions
2016	A-B	Bloomfield Hills Marian Mustangs
	C-D	Waterford Our Lady of the Lakes Lakers
2015	A-B	Bloomfield Hills Marian Mustangs
	C-D	Riverview Gabriel Richard Pioneers
2014	A-B	Farmington Hills Mercy Marlins Mercy
	C-D	Madison Heights Bishop Foley Ventures
2013	A-B	Bloomfield Hills Marian Mustangs
	C-D	Waterford Our Lady of the Lakes Lakers
2012	A-B	Dearborn Divine Child Falcons
	C-D	Riverview Gabriel Richard Pioneers
2011	A-B	Farmington Hills Mercy Marlins
	C-D	Waterford Our Lady of the Lakes Lakers
2010	A-B	Bloomfield Hills Marian Mustangs
	C-D	Waterford Our Lady of the Lakes Lakers
2009	A-B	Bloomfield Hills Marian Mustangs
	C-D	Waterford Our Lady of the Lakes Lakers
2008	Central	Bloomfield Hills Marian Mustangs
	AA	Allen Park Cabrini Monarchs
	CD	Marine City Cardinal Mooney Cardinals
2007	Central/AA	Livonia Ladywood Blazers
	East/West	Allen Park Cabrini Monarchs
2006	Central/AA	Livonia Ladywood Blazers
2005	Central/AA	Livonia Ladywood Blazers
	East/West	Ann Arbor Father Gabriel Richard Fighting Irish
2004	East/West	Harper Woods Trinity Catholic Lancers
	CD	Wyandotte Our Lady of Mount Carmel Comets
2003	East/West	Harper Woods Trinity Catholic Lancers
	CD	Wyandotte Our Lady of Mount Carmel Comets
2002	Central/AA	Bloomfield Hills Marian Mustangs
	East/West	Detroit Dominican Ravens
	CD	Center Line St. Clement Crusaders
2001	Central/AA	Bloomfield Hills Marian Mustangs
	CD	Center Line St. Clement Crusaders
2000	Central/AA	Redford Bishop Borgess Spartans
	East/West	Detroit Benedictine Ravens
	CD	Hamtramck St. Florian Lancers
1999	Central/AA	Dearborn Divine Child Falcons
	East/West	Detroit Benedictine Ravens
	CD	Redford St. Agatha Aggies
1998	Central/AA	Madison Heights Bishop Foley Ventures
	East/West	Detroit Benedictine Ravens
	CD	Detroit Holy Redeemer Lions
1997	Central/AA	Bloomfield Hills Marian Mustangs
	East/West	Detroit Dominican Ravens
	CD	Warren Immaculate Conception Bengals
1996	Central/AA	Bloomfield Hills Marian Mustangs
	East/West	Detroit Dominican Ravens
	CD	Warren Immaculate Conception Bengals
1995	Central/AA	Redford Bishop Borgess Spartans
	East/West	Waterford Our Lady of the Lakes Lakers
	CD	Warren Immaculate Conception Bengals
1994	Central/AA	Dearborn Divine Child Falcons
	East/West	Royal Oak Shrine Catholic Knights
	CD	Detroit Dominican Ravens
1993	AB	Bloomfield Hills Marian Mustangs
	East/West	Ann Arbor Father Gabriel Richard Fighting Irish
	CD	Marine City Cardinal Mooney Cardinals
1992	AB	Birmingham Marian Mustangs
	East/West	Hamtramck St. Florian Lancers
	CD	Marine City Cardinal Mooney Cardinals
1991	AB	Harper Woods Regina Saddlelites
	East/West	Royal Oak Shrine Catholic Knights
	CD	St. Mary of Redford Rustics
1990	AB	Harper Woods Regina Saddlelites
	CD	Detroit St. Martin de Porres Eagles
1989	AB	Dearborn Divine Child Falcons
	CD	Waterford Our Lady of the Lakes Lakers
1988	AB	Birmingham Marian Mustangs
	CD	Detroit St. Martin de Porres Eagles
1987	AB	Birmingham Marian Mustangs
	CD	Detroit St. Martin de Porres Eagles
1986	AB	Birmingham Marian Mustangs
	CD	Detroit St.Martin de Porres Eagles
1985	AB	Dearborn Divine Child Falcons
	CD	Detroit St. Martin de Porres Eagles
1984	AB	Livonia Ladywood Blazers
	CD	Detroit St. Martin de Porres Eagles
1983	AB	Farmington Hills Mercy Marlins
	CD	Wyandotte Our Lady of Mount Carmel Comets
1982	AB	Livonia Ladywood Blazers
	CD	Redford St. Agatha Aggies
1981	AB	Harper Woods Regina Saddlelites
	CD	Redford St. Agatha Aggies
1980	AB	Harper Woods Regina Saddlelites
	CD	Detroit Holy Redeemer Lions
1979	AB	Livonia Ladywood Blazers
	CD	Detroit Holy Redeemer Lions
1978	AB	Royal Oak Shrine Knights
	CD	Pontiac Catholic Titans
1977		Farmington Hills Mercy Marlins
1976		Farmington Hills Mercy Marlins
1975		Farmington Hills Mercy Marlins
1974		Hamtramck St. Ladislaus Greyhounds

== Softball Championships ==
Softball championship facts:

- Since CHSL softball championship games began being played in 1975, and through 2015, the Waterford Our Lady of the Lakes Lakers have won the most softball championships of any school in league history with fourteen.
- The Allen Park Cabrini Monarchs have the second most softball championships with eleven, while the Warren Regina Saddlelites follow closely behind with ten championships.

CHSL Softball Champions
Year	Division	Champions
2015	A-B	Warren Regina Saddlelites
	C-D	Waterford Our Lady of the Lakes Lakers
2014	A-B	Farmington Hills Mercy Marlins
	C-D	Wixom St. Catherine Siena Stars
2013	A-B	Farmington Hills Mercy Marlins
	C-D	Royal Oak Shrine Catholic Knights
2012	A-B	Livonia Ladywood Blazers
	C-D	Ann Arbor Father Gabriel Richard Fighting Irish
2011	A-B	Livonia Ladywood Blazers
	C-D	Waterford Our Lady of the Lakes Lakers
2010	A-B	Allen Park Cabrini Monarchs
	C-D	Marine City Cardinal Mooney Cardinals
2009	A-B	Allen Park Cabrini Monarchs
	C-D	Waterford Our Lady of the Lakes Lakers
2008	A-B	Allen Park Cabrini Monarchs
	C-D	Royal Oak Shrine Catholic Knights
2007	A-B	Pontiac Notre Dame Prep Fighting Irish
	C-D	Allen Park Cabrini Monarchs
2006	A-B	Livonia Ladywood Blazers
	C-D	Allen Park Cabrini Monarchs
2005	A-B	Harper Woods Regina Saddlelites
	C-D	Center Line St. Clement Crusaders
2004	I	Birmingham Marian Mustangs
	II	Royal Oak Shrine Catholic Knights
2003	A-B	Farmington Hills Mercy Marlins
	C-D	Marine City Cardinal Mooney Cardinals
2002	A-B	Harper Woods Regina Saddlelites
	C-D	Waterford Our Lady of the Lakes Lakers
2001	A-B	Farmington Hills Mercy Marlins
	CD	Waterford Our Lady of the Lakes Lakers
2000	A-B	La Salle (Ont.) St. Thomas Villanova
	C-D	Waterford Our Lady of the Lakes Lakers
1999	A-B	Harper Woods Regina Saddlelites
	C-D	Center Line St. Clement Crusaders
1998	A-B	Harper Woods Regina Saddlelites
	C-D	Waterford Our Lady of the Lakes Lakers
1997	A-B	Livonia Ladywood Blazers
	C-D	Waterford Our Lady of the Lakes Lakers
1996	A-B	Harper Woods Regina Saddlelites
	C-D	Center Line St. Clement Crusaders
1995	A-B	Dearborn Divine Child Falcons
	C-D	Waterford Our Lady of the Lakes Lakers
1994	A-B	Dearborn Divine Child Falcons
	C-D	Marine City Cardinal Mooney Cardinals
1993	A-B	Dearborn Divine Child Falcons
	C-D	Waterford Our Lady of the Lakes Lakers
1992	AB	Dearborn Divine Child Falcons
	C-D	Waterford Our Lady of the Lakes Lakers
1991	A-B	Farmington Hills Mercy Marlins
	C-D	Waterford Our Lady of the Lakes Lakers
1990	A-B	Riverview Gabriel Richard Pioneers
	C-D	Oakland Catholic Titans
1989	A-B	Harper Woods Regina Saddlelites
	C-D	Waterford Our Lady of the Lakes Lakers
1988	A-B	Harper Woods Regina Saddlelites
	C-D	Waterford Our Lady of the Lakes Lakers
1987	A-B	Harper Woods Regina Saddlelites
	C-D	Allen Park Cabrini Monarchs
1986	A-B	Dearborn Divine Child Falsons
	C-D	Pontiac Catholic Titans
1985	A-B	Harper Woods Regina Saddlelites
	C-D	Allen Park Cabrini Monarchs
1984	A-B	Dearborn Divine Child Falcons
	C-D	Allen Park Cabrini Monarchs
1983	A-B	Redford Bishop Borgess Spartans
	C-D	Allen Park Cabrini Monarchs
1982	A-B	Harper Woods Regina Saddlelites
	C-D	Allen Park Cabrini Monarchs
1981	A-B	Dearborn Divine Child Falcons
	C-D	Pontiac Catholic Titans
1980	A-B	Royal Oak Shrine Catholic Knights
	C-D	Grosse Pointe Woods Our Lady Star of the Sea Tunas
1979	A-B	Dearborn Divine Child Falcons
	C-D	Allen Park Cabrini Monarchs
1978	A-B	Madison Heights Bishop Foley Ventures
	C-D	St. Mary of Redford Rustics
1977		Redford Bishop Borgess Spartans
1976		Redford Bishop Borgess Spartans
1975		Redford Bishop Borgess Spartans

== Football Championships ==
In 1926, Detroit Holy Redeemer and Detroit St. Leo faced each other in the first football game to determine the champion of the Detroit Parochial League (later the CHSL). Holy Redeemer won that game 14–9.

The game has been played every year since 1926 under various names, with Detroit Catholic Central winning twenty-eight football league championship games, the most of any school in league history.

Starting in 1948, the league championship game was called "The Soup Bowl", as the Capuchin Soup kitchen became the benefactor of some of the proceeds from the game. The Soup Bowl game was always played at University of Detroit Stadium. After the affiliation with the Capuchins ended in 1967 the game was called the "Charity Bowl" and since 1971 the "Prep Bowl".

The Prep Bowl was played at the Pontiac Silverdome and, since 2002, at Ford Field. The Prep Bowl today also involves the Detroit Catholic Youth Organization (CYO) for Catholic elementary schools as well as games within the high school divisions of the CHSL.

Prep Bowl facts:

Through 2015, the winningest high schools in Prep Bowl history, regardless of divisions, are:

- Bloomfield Hills Brother Rice (twenty-three A-B Division, Central-AA Division and Wildcard wins)
- Detroit Catholic Central (twenty A-B Division, Central-AA Division and Wildcard wins)
- Waterford Our Lady of the Lakes (fourteen C-D Division and Wildcard wins)

For all Prep Bowl high school football game results, click here

The Prep Bowl
Year	Game Results (A-B Division)
2015	Orchard Lake St. Mary's Prep 38, Warren De La Salle 0
2014	Bloomfield Hills Brother Rice 29, Orchard Lake St. Mary's Prep 28
2013	Bloomfield Hills Brother Rice 20, Detroit Catholic Central 7
2012	Orchard Lake St. Mary's 27, Detroit Catholic Central 10
2011	Detroit Catholic Central 21, Orchard Lake St. Mary's Prep7
2010	Bloomfield Hills Brother Rice 17, Orchard Lake St. Mary's Prep 14
2009	Detroit Catholic Central 7, Orchard Lake St. Mary's Prep 0
2008	Warren De La Salle 28, Detroit Catholic Central 14
2007	Bloomfield Hills Brother Rice 45, Orchard Lake St. Mary's Prep 14
2006	Bloomfield Hills Brother Rice 24, Warren De La Salle 21
2005	Orchard Lake St. Mary's Prep 20, Bloomfield Hills Brother Rice 7
2004	Bloomfield Hills Brother Rice 24, Detroit St. Martin De Porres 6
2003	Detroit Catholic Central 34, Dearborn Divine Child 7
2002	Detroit Catholic Central 45, Dearborn Divine Child 14
2001	Orchard Lake St. Mary's Prep 14, Bloomfield Hills Brother Rice 3
2000	Bloomfield Hills Brother Rice 24, Detroit Catholic Central 7
1999	Detroit Catholic Central 31, Bloomfield Hills Brother Rice 12
1998	Detroit Catholic Central 22, Orchard Lake St. Mary's Prep 15
1997	Orchard Lake St. Marys 20, Madison Heights Bishop Foley 6
1996	Detroit Catholic Central 28, Bloomfield Hills Brother Rice 0
1995	Detroit Catholic Central 17, Bloomfield Hills Brother Rice 7
1994	Orchard Lake St. Mary's Prep 21, Warren De La Salle 7
1993	Detroit Catholic Central 35, Harper Woods Bishop Gallagher 0
1992	Detroit Catholic Central 17, Detroit St. Martin De Porres 6
1991	Detroit St. Martin De Porres 16, Detroit Catholic Central 15
1990	Detroit Catholic Central 31, Detroit St. Martin De Porres 0
1989	Birmingham Brother Rice 36, Southgate Aquinas 7
1988	Detroit Catholic Central 28, University of Detroit Jesuit 7
1987	Detroit Catholic Central 19, Southgate Aquinas 0
1986	Birmingham Brother Rice 12, Dearborn Divine Child 8
1985	Detroit Catholic Central 13, Dearborn Divine Child 0
1984	Dearborn Divine Child 14, Warren De La Salle 10
1983	Birmingham Brother Rice 13, Dearborn Divine Child 10
1982	Detroit Catholic Central 10, Birmingham Brother Rice 0
1981	Birmingham Brother Rice 14, Dearborn Divine Child 7
1980	Birmingham Brother Rice 27, Detroit De La Salle 3
1979	Detroit Catholic Central 16, Detroit De La Salle 0
1978	Birmingham Brother Rice 30, Harper Woods Bishop Gallagher 13
1977	Birmingham Brother Rice 30, Royal Oak Shrine 7
1976	Harper Woods Notre Dame 22, Southgate Aquinas 12
1975	Dearborn Divine Child 7, Birmingham Brother Rice 0
1974	Birmingham Brother Rice 35, Madison Heights Bishop Foley 0
1973	Dearborn Divine Child 34, Detroit Catholic Central 7
1972	Dearborn Divine Child 31, Detroit Catholic Central 0
1971	Birmingham Brother Rice 20, Redford Bishop Borgess 0

The Charity Bowl
Year	Game Results (A-B Division)
1970	Royal Oak Shrine 18, Birmingham Brother Rice 0
1969	Dearborn Divine Child 16, Detroit Catholic Central 0
1968	Dearborn Divine Child 21, University of Detroit High 7

Soup Bowl Fact:

- St. Mary of Redford won the most Soup Bowl games (7) followed by Grosse Pointe St. Ambrose (5).

The Soup Bowl
Year	Game Results (1948-1967)
1967	Dearborn Divine Child 21, Birmingham Brother Rice 6
1966	Grosse Pointe St. Ambrose 6, Harper Woods Notre Dame 0
1965	Harper Woods Notre Dame 27, Grosse Pointe St. Ambrose 21
1964	Grosse Pointe St. Ambrose 21, Detroit Cathedral 13
1963	Harper Woods Notre Dame 0, Royal Oak Shrine 0
1962	Grosse Pointe St. Ambrose 33, Harper Woods Notre Dame 13
1961	Grosse Pointe St. Ambrose 37, Detroit Catholic Central 0
1960	Detroit Catholic Central 20, Royal Oak Shrine 7
1959	Grosse Pointe St. Ambrose 14, Royal Oak Shrine 6
1958	St. Mary of Redford 33, University of Detroit High 7
1957	St. Mary of Redford 27, Harper Woods Notre Dame 13
1956	Detroit De La Salle 44, Grosse Pointe St. Ambrose 6
1955	St. Mary of Redford 7, Detroit St. Anthony 6
1954	St. Mary of Redford 34, Detroit St. Anthony 24
1953	River Rouge Lady of Lourdes 26, Detroit St. Joseph 12
1952	St. Mary of Redford 27, Detroit St. Anthony 20
1951	St. Mary of Redford 34, Detroit De La Salle 0
1950	Detroit St. Gregory 18, Hamtramck St. Ladislaus 6
1949	Detroit St. Anthony 13, Detroit St. Theresa of Avila 7
1948	St. Mary of Redford 28, Detroit De La Salle 19

Parochial League Football Championship Facts:

- From 1926 to 1947, Detroit Catholic Central won the most league football championships (6) followed by Detroit Holy Redeemer (4) and Detroit St. Theresa of Avila (4).

Parochial League Football Championship
Year	Game Results (1926-1947)
1947	St. Mary of Redford 8, Detroit De La Salle 7
1946	Detroit St. Anthony 26, River Rouge Lady of Lourdes 21
1945	Detroit Catholic Central defeated River Rouge Lady of Lourdes
1944	Detroit Holy Redeemer 20, Detroit Catholic Central 12
1943	Detroit Catholic Central 19, Detroit St. Anthony 6
1942	Detroit Catholic Central 13, Detroit St. Theresa of Avila 0
1941	Detroit St. Theresa of Avila defeated Detroit Catholic Central
1940	Detroit St. Theresa of Avila 19, Detroit Catholic Central 13
1939	Detroit Catholic Central won championship game
1938	Detroit Catholic Central won championship game
1937	Detroit Catholic Central defeated Detroit Holy Redeemer
1936	University of Detroit High won championship game
1935	Detroit St. Theresa of Avila defeated Royal Oak St. Mary
1934	Detroit St. Theresa of Avila defeated Royal Oak St. Mary
1933	River Rouge Lady of Lourdes 19, Detroit Holy Redeemer 6
1932	Detroit St. Joseph defeated St. Mary of Redford
1931	Detroit De La Salle18, Detroit St. Anthony 0
1930	Detroit St. Joseph defeated Detroit St. Leo
1929	Detroit De La Salle 7, Detroit St. Joseph 0
1928	Detroit Holy Redeemer 20, Detroit St. Leo 0
1927	Detroit Holy Redeemer 12, Wyandotte St. Patrick 0
1926	Detroit Holy Redeemer 14, Detroit St. Leo 9

== Operation Friendship ==
In 1947, the Detroit City League boys basketball champion and the Detroit Parochial League boys basketball champion met at Olympia Stadium in Detroit to play for the first time to determine who would wear the crown as the Detroit City Basketball Champions. The game between Detroit Miller High School and Detroit St. Joseph High School drew so much interest it sold out Olympia Stadium, with a capacity of 11,563 and in so doing established a state record for attendance at a high school basketball game. This was the first of what would, in later years, become known as the Operation Friendship Championship pitting the best of the Detroit Public School League against the Catholic High School League. At the end of the evening, the Detroit Miller Trojans defeated the Detroit St. Joseph Blue Jays 47–34 to claim the first ever Detroit City Basketball High School Championship. Since that game, the Detroit Public School League champions and the Detroit Catholic High School League champions have met nearly every year to determine the Detroit City Champions. In later years, the game would become known as the Operation Friendship Championship. The game has been played at University of Detroit's Calihan Hall (formerly Memorial Hall) virtually every year, although Cobo Arena in Detroit has also hosted the basketball classic.

Operation Friendship facts:

- The Public School League has won 41 of the 56 Operation Friendship Championship Games played through 2016.
- Since 2005, the CHSL has won six Operation Friendship championships, while the PSL has won five.
- Detroit Southwestern has won the most Operation Friendship championship games with nine, followed by Detroit Northwestern with five and Detroit Eastern/Detroit King with five. Orchard Lake St. Mary's Prep has won three Operation Friendship championship games, the most among CHSL schools.

Operation Friendship
Year	Winning League	Championship Boys Basketball Game Results
2016	CHSL	University of Detroit Jesuit Cubs 92, Detroit East English Village Bulldogs 76
2015	PSL	Detroit Western Cowboys 55, University of Detroit Jesuit Cubs 46
2014		Operation Friendship Game was not played in 2014.
2013	PSL	Detroit Pershing Doughboys 74, University of Detroit Jesuit Cubs 59
2012	CHSL	Detroit Catholic Central Shamrocks 56, Detroit King Crusaders 48
2011	CHSL	Warren De La Salle Pilots 55, Detroit Southeastern Jungaleers 49
2010	PSL	Detroit Pershing Doughboys 77, Warren De La Salle Pilots 50
2009	PSL	Detroit Pershing Doughboys 82, Warren De La Salle Pilots 75
2008	CHSL	Orchard Lake St. Mary's Prep Eaglets 73, Detroit Northwestern Colts 59
2007	CHSL	Orchard Lake St. Mary's Prep Eaglets 81, Detroit Redford Huskies 79 (OT)
2006	PSL	Detroit Redford Huskies 66, Orchard Lake St. Mary's Prep Eaglets 63
2005	CHSL	Detroit St. Martin DePorres Eagles 57, Detroit Redford Huskies 55
2004	PSL	Detroit Renaissance Phoenix 61, Orchard Lake St. Mary's Prep Eaglets 32
2003	PSL	Detroit Renaissance Phoenix 57, Detroit St. Martin de Porres Eagles 50
2002	PSL	Detroit Finney Highlanders 59, Warren De La Salle Pilots 47
2001	PSL	Detroit Redford Huskies 73, Warren De La Salle Pilots 57
2000	CHSL	Orchard Lake St. Mary's Prep Eaglets 57, Detroit Renaissance Phoenix 54
1999	PSL	Detroit King Crusaders 63, Orchard Lake St. Mary's Prep Eaglets 55
1998	PSL	Detroit Cass Tech Technicians 73, Redford Bishop Borgess Spartans 68
1997	PSL	Detroit Denby Tars 69, Detroit Catholic Central Shamrocks 56
1996	PSL	Detroit Pershing Doughboys 88, Detroit Catholic Central Shamrocks 69
1995	PSL	Detroit Pershing Doughboys 58, Detroit St. Martin de Porres Eagles 50
1994	PSL	Detroit Murray-Wright Pilots 79, Detroit Catholic Central Shamrocks 61
1993	CHSL	Southgate Aquinas Raiders 59, Detroit Cass Tech Technicians 56
1992	PSL	Detroit Cooley Cardinals 83, University of Detroit High Cubs 47
1991	PSL	Detroit Southwestern Prospectors 84, Detroit St. Martin de Porres Eagles 55
1990	PSL	Detroit Southwestern Prospectors 84, Birmingham Brother Rice Warriors 51
1989	PSL	Detroit Southwestern Prospectors 85, Detroit Catholic Central Shamrocks 44
1988	PSL	Detroit Southwestern Prospectors 62, Warren De La Salle Pilots 58
1987	PSL	Detroit Southwestern Prospectors 92, Redford Bishop Borgess Spartans 64
1986	PSL	Detroit Northern Jayhawks 60, Southgate Aquinas Raiders 54
1985	CHSL	Detroit St. Martin de Porres Eagles 58, Detroit Southwestern Prospectors 57
1984	PSL	Detroit Mackenzie Stags 70, Detroit St. Martin de Porres Eagles 53
1983	PSL	Detroit Southwestern Prospectors 53, Detroit Catholic Central Shamrocks 52
1982	PSL	Detroit Southwestern Prospectors 57, Birmingham Brother Rice Warriors 45
1981	PSL	Detroit Southwestern Prospectors 67, Birmingham Brother Rice Warriors 60
1980	PSL	Detroit Central Trailblazers 74, Detroit Catholic Central Shamrocks 50
1979	PSL	Detroit Murray-Wright Pilots 70, Birmingham Brother Rice Warriors 69
1978	CHSL	Royal Oak Shrine Knights 50, Detroit Northwestern Colts 44 (OT)
1977	PSL	Detroit Cass Tech Technicians 54, Dearborn Divine Child Falcons 45
1976	PSL	Detroit Northeastern Falcons 72, Detroit Catholic Central Shamrocks 59
		No Operation Friendship Games were played from 1969 to 1975.
1968	CHSL	Detroit Catholic Central Shamrocks 57, Detroit Murray-Wright Pilots 56
1967	PSL	Detroit Northwestern Colts 84, Detroit Visitation Eagles 65
1966	CHSL	Detroit Austin Friars 69, Detroit Northwestern Colts 68
1965	PSL	Detroit Northwestern Colts 71, Detroit Holy Redeemer Lions 55
1964	PSL	Detroit Northwestern Colts 49, Grosse Pointe St. Paul Lakers 42
1963	CHSL	Grosse Pointe St. Paul Lakers 55, Detroit Pershing Doughboys 46
1962	PSL	Detroit Eastern Indians 56, Grosse Pointe St. Paul Lakers 30
1961	PSL	Detroit Eastern Indians 56, Detroit Catholic Central Shamrocks 53
1960	PSL	Detroit Eastern Indians 69, Detroit Holy Redeemer Lions 52
1959	PSL	Detroit Eastern Indians 56, Detroit Holy Redeemer Lions 41
1958	CHSL	Detroit Austin Friars 63, Detroit Northeastern Falcons 40
1957	PSL	Detroit Northwestern Colts 42, Detroit All Saints Saints 32
1956	CHSL	Detroit St. Andrew Flyers 61, Detroit Southeastern Jungaleers 58
1955	PSL	Detroit Cass Tech Technicians 59, Royal Oak Shrine Knights 43
1954	PSL	Detroit Northwestern Colts 53, River Rouge Our Lady of Lourdes Bears 50
1953	PSL	Detroit Southwestern Prospectors 43, Wyandotte Our Lady of Mount Carmel Comets 41
		No Operation Friendship Games were played from 1948 to 1952.
1947	PSL	Detroit Miller Trojans 47, Detroit St. Joseph Blue Jays 34

== Goodfellow Game ==
The Goodfellow Game was an annual high school football game for the unofficial city of Detroit high school football championship. The game was played between the champions of the Detroit City League (later the Detroit Public School League) and the Detroit Parochial League (later the Catholic High School League). The Goodfellow Game was played every year from 1938 through 1967. The Goodfellow Game was always played at Briggs/Tiger Stadium.

The Goodfellow Game was played in a time before Michigan had a high school state championship playoff. As a result, the Goodfellow Game was considered one of the state's most prestigious high school football games of its time.

Goodfellow Game facts:

- The Detroit Parochial League won sixteen Goodfellow Games, the Detroit City League won eleven and there were three ties in the 30 Goodfellow Games played.
- The Detroit Denby Tars played in the most Goodfellow Games of any school with nine. The Detroit St. Mary of Redford Rustics played in seven Goodfellow Games, the most among Detroit Parochial League schools.
- The Grosse Pointe St. Ambrose Cavaliers and the Detroit Catholic Central Shamrocks won the most Goodfellow Games with five each. The Detroit Denby Tars won four Goodfellow Games, the most among Detroit City League schools.
- The Grosse Pointe St. Ambrose Cavaliers had the most Goodfellow Game shutouts with three, while the Detroit Denby Tars had the most tied Goodfellow Games with two.
- The University of Detroit High Cubs played in three Goodfellows Games, all representing the Detroit City League, before joining the Detroit Parochial League in 1958.
- The Goodfellow Game regularly drew crowds of 40,000 spectators at its peak in the late 1950s and early 1960s.

The Goodfellow Game
Year	Winning League	Game Results
1938	Parochial League	Detroit Catholic Central Shamrocks 19, Hamtramck Cosmos 13
1939	City League	Detroit Catholic Central Shamrocks 19, Hamtramck Cosmos 13
1940	Tie	University of Detroit High Cubs 20, Detroit Catholic Central Shamrocks 0
1941	City League	Detroit Cooley Cardinals 47, Detroit St. Theresa of Avila Pirates 6
1942	Parochial League	Detroit Catholic Central Shamrocks 46, Hamtramck Cosmos 0
1943	Parochial League	Detroit Catholic Central Shamrocks 8, Detroit Cooley Cardinals 0
1944	City League	Detroit Mackenzie Stags 3, Detroit Holy Redeemer Lions 0
1945	Tie	Detroit Catholic Central Shamrocks 19, Detroit Denby Tars 19
1946	City League	Detroit Cooley Cardinals 21, Detroit St. Anthony Teutons 13
1947	City League	Detroit Denby Tars 14, Detroit St. Mary of Redford Rustics 0
1948	City League	Detroit Denby Tars 28, Detroit St. Mary of Redford Rustics 0
1949	Parochial League	Detroit St. Anthony Teutons 19, University of Detroit High Cubs 13
1950	City League	Detroit Redford Huskies 7, Detroit St. Gregory Cherokees 6
1951	Parochial League	Detroit St. Mary of Redford Rustics 23, Detroit Western Cowboys 6
1952	Parochial League	Detroit St. Mary of Redford Rustics 13, University of Detroit High Cubs 6
1953	City League	Detroit Pershing Doughboys 21, River Rouge Lady of Lourdes Bears 7
1954	Parochial League	University of Detroit High Cubs 23, Detroit St. Mary of Redford Rustics 20
1955	City League	Detroit Pershing Doughboys 13, Detroit St. Mary of Redford Rustics 7
1956	Parochial League	Detroit De La Salle Pilots 26, Detroit Denby Tars 20
1957	Parochial League	Detroit St. Mary of Redford Rustics 25, Detroit Southeastern Jungaleers 6
1958	City League	Detroit Redford Huskies 27, Detroit St. Mary of Redford Rustics 7
1959	Parochial League	Grosse Pointe St. Ambrose Cavaliers 13, Detroit Cooley Cardinals 7
1960	City League	Detroit Denby Tars 21, Detroit Catholic Central Shamrocks 18
1961	Parochial League	Grosse Pointe St. Ambrose Cavaliers 20, Detroit Pershing Doughboys 0
1962	Parochial League	Grosse Pointe St. Ambrose Cavaliers 19, Detroit Cooley Cardinals 0
1963	City League	Detroit Denby Tars 7, Harper Woods Notre Dame Fightin' Irish 0
1964	Parochial League	Grosse Pointe St. Ambrose Cavaliers 20, Detroit Southeastern Jungaleers 0
1965	Tie	Harper Woods Notre Dame Fightin' Irish 14, Detroit Denby Tars 14
1966	Parochial League	Grosse Pointe St. Ambrose Cavaliers 33, Detroit Denby Tars 19
1967	Parochial League	Dearborn Divine Child Falcons 14, Detroit Denby Tars 7
