= Perry Richards =

American football player (1934–2008)

No. 86, 87, 83, 85, 84, 80
- Position: End

Personal information
- Born: January 14, 1934; Detroit, Michigan, U.S.
- Died: July 16, 2008 (aged 74); Taylor, Michigan, U.S.
- Listed height: 6 ft 2 in (1.88 m)
- Listed weight: 205 lb (93 kg)

Career information
- High school: St. Rita (Detroit)
- College: Detroit Mercy (1953–1956)
- NFL draft: 1957: 5th round, 55th overall pick

Career history
- Pittsburgh Steelers (1957); Detroit Lions (1958); Chicago / St. Louis Cardinals (1959–1960); Buffalo Bills (1961); New York Titans (1962)

Career NFL/AFL statistics
- Receptions: 39
- Receiving yards: 558
- Touchdowns: 4
- Stats at Pro Football Reference

Perry Richards (January 14, 1934 – July 16, 2008) was an American football end. He played for the Pittsburgh Steelers in 1957, Detroit Lions in 1958, Chicago / St. Louis Cardinals from 1959 to 1960, Buffalo Bills in 1961 and for the New York Titans in 1962.
