= Dominican High School =

Dominican High School may refer to:

- Dominican High School (Galveston, Texas), United States
- Dominican High School (Whitefish Bay, Wisconsin), United States
- St. Mary's Dominican High School, New Orleans, Louisiana, United States
- Dominican High School (Detroit), Michigan, United States

== See also ==
- Dominican Convent High School, Harare
- Dominican Convent High School, Bulawayo
