= Cardinal Mooney High School =

Cardinal Mooney High School may refer to:

- Cardinal Mooney Catholic High School (Michigan)
- Cardinal Mooney High School (New York)
- Cardinal Mooney High School (Florida)
- Cardinal Mooney High School (Ohio)
