= Jack Piana =

American basketball player

Personal information
- Born: August 6, 1918 Detroit, Michigan, U.S.
- Died: July 10, 2001 (aged 82) Grosse Pointe Woods, Michigan, U.S.
- Listed height: 6 ft 2 in (1.88 m)
- Listed weight: 190 lb (86 kg)

Career information
- High school: St. Anthony (Detroit, Michigan)
- College: Detroit Mercy (1936–1940)
- Playing career: 1941–1947
- Position: Forward

Career history
- 1941: Detroit Eagles
- 1941–1942: Detroit AAA
- 1946–1947: Detroit Mansfields

John Richard Piana (August 6, 1918 – July 10, 2001) was an American professional basketball player. He played for the Detroit Eagles in the National Basketball League for two games during the 1940–41 season – one in the regular season, and one in the postseason. He played college basketball at the University of Detroit Mercy.
