= Frederick Delaney =

Frederick Delaney (1906–1985), On assignment by Archbishop of Detroit Edward Aloysius Mooney in 1948, Father Delaney opened St. Patrick's Parish in White Lake, Michigan and Our Lady of the Lakes Parish and School in Waterford, Michigan.
