= St. Mary High School (Royal Oak, Michigan) =

- 628 W. Lafayette Ave. Royal Oak, Michigan; United States

Information
- Type: Private, Coed
- Closed: 1985
- Grades: 9–12
- Colors: Blue and White
- Athletics conference: Catholic High School League
- Nickname: Irish
- Rival: Waterford Our Lady of the Lakes

St. Mary High School was a coeducational Catholic high school in Royal Oak, Michigan, United States. It closed in 1985.
