= Salesian High School (Detroit) =

Salesian Catholic High School
- 60 Harper Ave. Detroit, Michigan; United States

Information
- Type: Private, All Boys
- Motto: Nihtl Contra Deum
- Established: 1950
- Closed: 1970
- Grades: 9–12
- Colors: Red and white
- Athletics conference: Catholic High School League
- Nickname: Knights
- Yearbook: Saldet

Salesian Catholic High School was an all boys Catholic high school opened on Harper Avenue in Detroit, Michigan, United States, in 1950. The school closed in 1970.
