= Holy Cross High School (Marine City, Michigan) =

- Marine City, Michigan, St. Clair County; United States

Information
- Type: Private, Coed
- Closed: 1989
- Grades: 9–12
- Colors: Blue and White
- Athletics conference: Catholic High School League
- Nickname: Crusaders

Holy Cross High School was a coeducational Catholic high school in Marine City, Michigan, United States. It closed in 1989 but reopened the following year as Cardinal Mooney Catholic High School.
