= St. Anthony High School (Detroit) =

- 5247 Sheridan St. Detroit, Michigan; United States

Information
- Type: Private, Co-educational
- Established: 1918
- Closed: 1969
- Grades: 9–12
- Colors: Maroon and White
- Athletics conference: Catholic High School League
- Nickname: Teutons

St. Anthony High School was a coeducational Catholic high school in Detroit, Michigan, United States and belonged to the Catholic Archdiocese of Detroit. The first high school was built in 1918 on the corner of Field and Frederick Street in Detroit. A new high school was then built in 1926 across the street, featuring 13 classrooms, laboratories, and a large study hall. St. Anthony was a member of the Michigan High School Athletic Association and competed athletically in the Catholic High School League.

Following a series of consolidations of Catholic schools, several were merged to form East Catholic High School in 1967 located in the former St Catherine's High School building; then in 1969, further consolidation occurred along with the relocation of East Catholic to the St. Anthony facility.

Notable alumni

- Dan Currie (1935–2017), professional football player for the Green Bay Packers
- Jack Piana (1918–2001), professional basketball player for the Detroit Eagles in the National Basketball League during the 1940–41 season
