= Regina High School (Michigan) =

Location
- 13900 Masonic Boulevard; Warren, Michigan 48088; United States
- Coordinates: 42°31′42″N 82°59′6″W

Information
- Type: Private girls secondary school
- Religious affiliations: Roman Catholic; Sisters of St. Joseph
- Established: 1956
- CEEB code: 231-873
- President: Anna Bulszewicz
- Principal: Prima Dailey
- Grades: 9–12
- Colors: Blue and white
- Athletics conference: Catholic High School League
- Nickname: Saddlelites
- Rival: Marian High School
- Accreditation: North Central Association of Colleges and Schools
- Website: www.reginahs.com

Regina High School (RHS) is a Roman Catholic, private, four year college preparatory high school for girls in Warren, Michigan in Metro Detroit. From the school's founding in 1956 through June, 2007, Regina was located in Harper Woods, but moved to Warren at the start of the 2007-2008 school year. Located in the Roman Catholic Archdiocese of Detroit, Regina is sponsored by the Sisters of St. Joseph, Third Order of St. Francis. The high school is fully accredited by the North Central Association of Colleges and Secondary Schools and is a member of the National Catholic Education Association and the Michigan Association of Non-Public Schools.

Regina High School began as a dream of Cardinal Edward Mooney of Detroit. This dream was realized when Regina opened in September 1956.

Regina's brother school was formerly Notre Dame High School in Harper Woods, which closed in 2005. Since moving to Warren in 2007, De La Salle has become its brother school.

== School rivalries ==
The major rival of Regina High School is Marian High School, located in Bloomfield Hills, Michigan. Each year, the Regina Saddlelites and the Marian Mustangs compete in Powder Puff Football.

== School identifiers ==
- Alma Mater: "Regina Mundi"
- Patron: Mary, Queen of the Universe (Regina Mundi)
- Colors: Blue & white
- Mascot: The "Saddlelites" (Given because the school uniform requires saddle shoes.)
- Mission: "Transforming Girls into Women of Faith and Vision in the Franciscan Tradition"

== Achievements ==
The Regina Varsity Softball team, under the leadership of Diane Laffey, have been Division 1 state champs for 4 years in a row. The soccer team were district champs in 2006, 2008 and district finalists in 2009. The bowling team, tennis team, and cross country team qualified for state finals.

== Notable alumni ==
Riley Brengman - ice hockey defenceman for the Boston Fleet of the PWHL
