= Communication & Media Arts High School =

High school in Detroit, Michigan, United States

Location
- 19501 Berg Rd; Detroit, Michigan 48219; United States; 42°26′5.4924″N 83°16′9.2886″W

Information
- School type: Public, magnet high school
- Established: 1992
- School district: Detroit Public Schools
- Principal: Tiffany Cox
- Faculty: 23
- Teaching staff: 18.30 (FTE)
- Grades: 9th - 12th
- Enrollment: 303 (2023-2024)
- Colors: Purple, White and Black,
- Mascot: Pharaohs
- Website: Communication Media Arts High School Website

Student assessments
- 2021–22 school year Change vs. prior year

M-STEP 11th grade proficiency rates (Science / Social Studies)
- Advanced %: ≤5 / ≤5
- Proficient %: ≤5 / ≤5
- PR. Proficient %: – / –
- Not Proficient %: – / –

Average test scores
- SAT Total: 785.1 (▼ −122.2)

Communication & Media Arts High School (CMA) is a public, magnet high school and part of Detroit Public Schools in Detroit, Michigan, United States. Kim Woo Gray was principal from when the school opened in 1992 until her retirement in 2008. CMA has twenty-three full-time staff and 512 students. CMA is one of four magnet schools in Detroit, others being (Renaissance High School, Cass Technical High School and Detroit School of Arts).

== School Campus History ==
The doors of CMA were first opened in 1992. It shared space in the Dewey Center for Urban Education using 1 hallway, 4 classrooms 4 teachers and 99 students. In 1993, it was then moved into a larger location (using the former facilities of St. Mary of Redford High School), located at 14771 Mansfield Street Detroit, MI 48227 (under the leadership of Principal Kim Woo Gray and Assistant Principal Stan Allen). In the new building, it now had its 1st class (class of 1996) and its incoming freshman (class of 1997). Every year after that, another year moved up until it had its first full freshman-senior student body, making the school complete with the classes of 1996-99. In 2010 the school had a new administration and had been struggling for years with declining enrollment and building problems. The new administration, led by Principal Donya Odom, faced the hard task of keeping up school morale while fighting to keep the doors open. After being on the school closure list at least 3 times, the school received a makeover and was featured on the NBC reality show “School Pride," that was aired in the fall of 2010. The makeover took just over a week to complete and brought together volunteers from staff, alumni, current students, residents from the community and leaders as well as DPS officials. It was hosted by Kym Whitley and Jacob Soboroff. A few items the school received were two new boilers, four rooftop air-conditioning units, a green room, updated classrooms and science labs, a state-of-the-art weight room and an updated library. As the school continued to grow they were in need of yet another facility and, in 2020, moved to 19501 Berg Rd, Detroit, MI 48219. This building was once occupied by Ludington Magnet Middle and Honors School.
