= Our Lady Star of the Sea High School (Michigan) =

Our Lady Star of the Sea Catholic School

Location
- 467 Fairford; Grosse Pointe Woods, Michigan 48236; United States
- Coordinates: 42°25′25″N 82°53′23″W

Information
- Type: Private girls high school
- Established: 1959
- Status: closed
- Closed: 1993
- Grades: 9-12
- Colors: Blue and White
- Athletics conference: Catholic High School League
- Nickname: Tunas

Our Lady Star of the Sea, commonly called Star of the Sea, was an all-girl Catholic high school, established in Grosse Pointe Woods, Michigan in 1959.

When the high closed in 1993, the parish middle school began using the building.

== Notable alumni ==
- Paula Campbell Kelly, General Counsel for Porsche Cars Canada
