= Our Lady of Lourdes High School (River Rouge, Michigan) =

Location
- River Rouge, Michigan; United States
- Coordinates: 42°16′27.1″N 83°08′08.7″W

Information
- Type: Private, Coed
- Established: 1913
- Closed: 1974
- Grades: 1–12
- Colors: Blue and White
- Athletics conference: Catholic High School League
- Nickname: Bears

Our Lady of Lourdes High School was a coeducational Catholic high school in River Rouge, Michigan. The school was opened in 1913 and closed in 1974.
