= St. Andrew High School (Detroit) =

- 5650 Cecil, Detroit, Michigan; United States

Information
- Type: Private, Co-educational
- Established: 1940
- Closed: 1983
- Grades: 9–12
- Colors: Red and White
- Athletics conference: Catholic High School League
- Nickname: Flyers
- Yearbook: Saltire

St. Andrew High School was a coeducational Catholic high school located at Cecil and McGraw streets in Detroit, Michigan, United States and belonged to the Roman Catholic Archdiocese of Detroit. The school was run by the Felician Sisters.

St. Andrew was a member of the Michigan High School Athletic Association and competed athletically in the Catholic High School League.

St. Andrew High School closed in 1983.

== Athletics ==
The Flyers won back-to-back boys basketball state championships in 1951 and 1952.

== Notable alumni ==
- Francis R. Reiss (1957), Roman Catholic Bishop
- Frank Tanana, Sr. (1952), professional baseball player.
