= St. Theresa of Avila High School (Detroit) =

- Detroit, Michigan; United States

Information
- School type: Private secondary Roman Catholic
- Closed: 1967
- School district: Archdiocese of Detroit
- Grades: 9-12
- Language: English
- Area: Urban
- Colors: Black and Gold
- Nickname: Pirates

St. Theresa of Avila High School, commonly called St. Theresa, was a private Coeducational catholic high school in Detroit, Michigan. It was a member of the Detroit Catholic High School League and was located on 8666 Quincy Street.

The school was a perennial football powerhouse in the 1930s and 1940s, having won multiple league championships.

The school closed in 1967.
