= St. Stanislaus High School (Detroit) =

St. Stanislaus Catholic High School

Location
- Detroit, Michigan; United States
- Coordinates: 42°22′20.6″N 83°02′47.9″W

Information
- Type: Private, Coed
- Established: 1928
- Closed: 1973
- Grades: 9–12
- Colors: Red and White
- Athletics conference: Catholic High School League
- Nickname: Broncos

St. Stanislaus Catholic High School was a coeducational Catholic high school, that opened in Detroit, Michigan, United States in 1928. The school was opened by St. Stanislaus Bishop and Martyr Roman Catholic Church and run by the Felician Sisters. It closed in 1973.
