= St. James High School (Ferndale, Michigan) =

- 241 Pearson St. Ferndale, Michigan; United States

Information
- Type: Private, Coed
- Closed: 1971
- Grades: 1–12
- Colors: Red and White
- Athletics conference: Catholic High School League
- Nickname: Dales

St. James High School was a coeducational Catholic high school in Ferndale, Michigan, United States. It closed in 1971.
