= St. Mary of Redford High School =

St. Mary's of Redford High School

Location
- Detroit, Michigan; United States; 42°23′53.9″N 83°12′20.9″W

Information
- Type: Private, Coed
- Established: 1922
- Closed: 1992
- Grades: 10–12
- Colors: Blue and White
- Athletics conference: Catholic High School League
- Nickname: Rustics

St. Mary's of Redford High School was a coeducational Catholic high school established in 1925 in Detroit, Michigan, United States. Communication & Media Arts High School was located on the campus from 1993 to 2020. DPSCD Virtual School now uses the site.

== History ==
While St. Mary of Redford Parish had been founded in 1843, it had no parochial school for its first seventy years. Soon after Fr. John Gilmary Cook assumed the pastorship in 1919, he invited the Sisters, Servants of the Immaculate Heart of Mary (IHM) to send teachers. Parishioners sold portions of their farmland to the city of Detroit, which was expanding its boundaries into the Redford area, to fund the project. The elementary school opened in September 1919, but neither the convent nor the school building were completed yet; classes were held in a former barn and the sisters lived at the parish of St. Agnes and commuted. The school added grades as resources became available, and the high school opened in 1922.

As Detroit boomed with the expansion of the automobile industry, the parish and schools grew rapidly. Despite repeated expansions, in 1937, the ninth, eleventh, and twelfth grades were forced to go to half-days. The Archdiocese of Detroit granted permission for a twelve-room addition in 1939 to house the high school, completed in 1940, but overcrowding plagued the school for years to come. The parish population increased to record levels during and after World War II, becoming the largest Catholic parish in Michigan. In the 1956–57 school year, 1,843 pupils were enrolled in its school, taught by 48 sisters, and the parish counted 4,455 registered families. A new senior high school building opened in 1964, and a new gymnasium and all-purpose room were dedicated in 1968.

The elevation of the Mother of Our Savior chapel and the Our Lady Queen of Hope chapel to independent parishes, and accelerating white flight following the 1967 Detroit riot, marked the beginning of a long period of declining population. Enrollment began to decline in the 1970s, as well as the sisters available to teach, and the high school eventually closed in 1992.
