= Servite High School (Detroit) =

Location
- Detroit, Michigan; United States
- Coordinates: 42°23′35.1″N 82°57′47.7″W

Information
- Type: Private, Coed
- Established: 1949
- Closed: 1987
- Grades: 9–12
- Colors: Black, White and Red
- Athletics conference: Catholic High School League
- Nickname: Panthers

Servite High School was a coeducational Catholic high school established in Detroit, Michigan, United States in 1949. The school mascot was the Panthers.
