= St. Anne High School (Warren, Michigan) =

Location
- Warren, Michigan; United States; 42°31′51.6″N 83°02′48.3″W

Information
- Type: Private, Coed
- Established: 1965
- Closed: 1987
- Grades: 9–12
- Color: Maroon white {color box|maroon}}
- Athletics conference: Catholic High School League
- Nickname: Saints

St. Anne High School was a coeducational Catholic high school in Warren, Michigan.

The school opened in 1965 and was operated by the Sisters, Servants of the Immaculate Heart of Mary. It closed in 1987.
