= Annunciation High School (Detroit) =

Coordinates: 42°21′37.1″N 82°59′04.7″W

- Detroit, Michigan

Information
- Type: Private, Coed
- Established: 1915
- Closed: 1967
- Grades: 9–12
- Colors: Blue and White
- Athletics conference: Catholic High School League
- Nickname: Cougars

Annunciation High School was a coeducational Catholic high school in Detroit, Michigan. The school was opened in 1915 and was operated by the Sisters, Servants of the Immaculate Heart of Mary. The school closed in 1967.
