= Cathedral High School (Detroit, Michigan) =

Cathedral High School (Detroit)

Location
- 60 Belmont, Detroit, Michigan; 48202; United States; 42°23′20.1″N 83°05′2.7″W

Information
- Type: Private, All-Boys
- Established: 1953
- Closed: 1970
- Grades: 9–12
- Enrollment: Peak enrollment 640 students 1966, enrollment at closing 72
- Colors: Green and White
- Athletics conference: Catholic High School League
- Nickname: Wildcats
- Tuition: At the time of Closing $250/year

Detroit Cathedral High School was a boys college preparatory Catholic high school in Detroit, Michigan. Established in 1953. the school closed in 1970.

The school was founded by the Marist Fathers in 1953 as Cathedral Central High School, In 1955, the Brothers of Christian Instruction took over the school. In 1961, because of confusion with Catholic Central High School in Grand Rapids, Michigan, the Brothers renamed their school Detroit Cathedral High School.

At its peak, Cathedral had a student population of 640. It was considered an elite school academically with a graduation rate over 97%, and a college attendance rate over 90%.

The Cathedral wildcats competed in the Catholic League's Central Division. One of their graduates was football player Reggie Cavender, who played at Michigan State, The Wildcats competed in football, basketball, baseball, ice hockey, track, golf and swimming. The hockey team won several state titles.

In 1966, due to the obsolescence of the Cathedral building, the Brothers began investigating a new site in western Wayne County. However, because of commitments the Brothers had made to Walsh University, they did not have the resources to build a new school In addition, the Archdiocese had already committed to building four new high schools in the Detroit area. The Brothers decided instead to close Cathedral.

The final class graduated from Cathedral in 1970. Student Mike Gruba described the school in its final yearbook:

“Though only the test of time will tell Cathedral’s influence on its men, still one thing is sure: their conduct will live on, long after their books have been closed. But to those of us of the final class, its inspiration will always be special. If, in the years to come, someone happens to exclaim, partly in jest, ‘Don’t tell me Cathedral’s still in business?’ –we’re sure to have a ready answer: It sure the Hell is!”
