= St. Francis de Sales High School (Detroit, Michigan) =

- 15325 Pinehurst St. Detroit, Michigan; United States

Information
- Type: Private, Coed
- Established: 1932
- Closed: 1971
- Grades: 9–12
- Colors: Blue and White
- Athletics conference: Catholic High School League
- Nickname: Monarchs

St. Francis de Sales High School was a coeducational Catholic high school in Detroit, Michigan, United States. The school closed in 1971. Since 1994, the school building has been home to Loyola High School.
