= St. Lawrence High School (Utica, Michigan) =

- 44429 Utica Rd. Utica, Michigan; United States

Information
- Type: Private, Coed
- Closed: 1971
- Grades: 9–12
- Colors: Blue and Yellow
- Athletics conference: Catholic High School League
- Nickname: Mustangs

St. Lawrence High School was a coeducational Catholic high school in Utica, Michigan, United States. It closed in 1971.
