= St. Agatha High School (Michigan) =

Location
- Redford, Michigan; United States
- Coordinates: 42°26′05.8″N 83°17′45.5″W

Information
- Type: Private, Coed
- Closed: 2003
- Grades: 9–12
- Colors: Green and White
- Athletics conference: Catholic High School League
- Nickname: Aggies

St. Agatha High School was a coeducational Catholic high school in Redford, Michigan. It closed and became St. Katharine Drexel High School in 2003.
