= Detroit East Catholic High School =

East Catholic High School (Detroit)

Location
- 5247 Sheridan St. Detroit, Michigan 48213; United States
- 42°22′34.0″N 83°01′06.3″W

Information
- Type: Private, Co-educational
- Closed: 2005
- Grades: 9–12
- Enrollment: 124 (in 2005)
- Colors: Green and White
- Athletics conference: Catholic High School League
- Nickname: Chargers

Detroit East Catholic High School (short form: "East Catholic", or "EC") was a co-educational college preparatory school in Detroit, Michigan and belonged to the Roman Catholic Archdiocese of Detroit.

East Catholic was a member of the Michigan High School Athletic Association (MHSAA) and competed athletically in the Catholic High School League (CHSL).

== History ==
The school was formed in 1967 at St Catherine. First graduating class was 1968. It merged Annunciation, St Rose, St Catherine and one other school that I don't remember the name. In 1969 it moved to St Anthony High school in Detroit. In the 1970s it had about 900 students, its peak enrollment. The population decreased since the area's socioeconomic profile became more low income and as Catholic families moved outside of Detroit. By the 2004-2005 school year, the student count was 124.

== Athletic accomplishments ==
The East Catholic Chargers won seven Michigan High School Athletic Association state championships in boys basketball.

== Closure ==
The school was closed in 2005 when Detroit East Catholic, along with St. Florian and Bishop Gallagher, formed Trinity Catholic High School as a collaborative.
