= All Saints High School (Detroit) =

Coordinates: 42°18′03.8″N 83°07′04.8″W

- Detroit, Michigan

Information
- Type: Private, Coed
- Established: 1922
- Closed: 1970
- Grades: 9–12
- Colors: Green and White
- Athletics conference: Catholic High School League
- Nickname: Saints

All Saints High School was a coeducational Catholic high school in Detroit, Michigan.

The school opened in 1922 and was operated by the Sisters, Servants of the Immaculate Heart of Mary.

== Athletics ==
All Saints won the Class C Boys Basketball State Championship in 1968.
