= Nativity High School =

Nativity High School (Detroit)

Location
- Detroit, Michigan; United States; 42°23′19.1″N 83°00′19.7″W

Information
- Type: Private, Co-educational
- Established: 1914
- Closed: 1971
- Grades: 9–12
- Colors: Black and Gold
- Athletics conference: Catholic High School League
- Nickname: Vikings

Nativity of Our Lord High School, commonly called Nativity High School, was established in Detroit, Michigan, in 1914. The Dominican Sisters from Racine, Wisconsin, and one lay person taught at the school.
