= Immaculata High School (Detroit) =

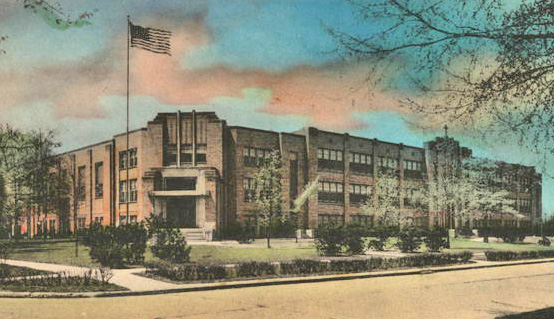

Location
- Detroit, Michigan; United States; 42°24′51″N 83°09′5″W

Information
- Type: Private, All-Girls
- Established: 1941
- Closed: 1983
- Grades: 9–12
- Colors: Blue and White
- Athletics conference: Catholic High School League
- Website
- Immaculata High School
- U.S. National Register of Historic Places
- Built: 1941
- Built by: W. E. Wood Company
- Architect: D. A. Bohlen & Son
- Architectural style: Modern Movement
- NRHP reference No.: 100008529
- Added to NRHP: August 1, 2023

Immaculata High School was an all-girls Catholic high school located at W. McNichols and Wyoming Ave. in Detroit, Michigan, United States. The school was opened in 1941 and was operated by the Sisters, Servants of the Immaculate Heart of Mary. The school closed in 1983. The building now houses The School at Marygrove Elementary.

== History ==
In the early 20th century, the Sisters of IHM had a strong presence in Detroit, staffing a large number of elementary schools as well as Marygrove College. In the years leading up to World War II the Catholic population in Detroit swelled, and there was an increased demand for Catholic secondary education. The Sisters retained the firm of D.A. Bohlen & Son to design the new high school, and ground was broken in February 1941 and dedicated in October of the same year. The IHM Sisters who taught at the school originally were housed in a house across the street from the school. However, in 1949 a new convent was constructed next to the high school for their use.

The school opened in 1942 with 600 students. The school offered a wide variety of courses, focusing on a college preparatory curriculum. Attendance grew, and peaked in the 1960s with over 1000 students. However, as the Catholic population of Detroit declined, so did enrollment. By 1979 the school had a budget deficit, and by 1981 enrollment was only 275 students. The school officially closed in June 1983.

In the mid-1980s, the sisters rented the building to CareerWorks, Inc., a company that taught basic job search skills. In 1992, the Detroit Public Schools began renting the building to house the Bates Academy, a Pre-K through 8th grade gifted and talented school. In 2002 the district purchased the building, and in 2009 sold it to Marygrove College. In 2018, the organization became The Marygrove Conservancy, a partnership between the IHM Sisters, Marygrove College, and the Kresge Foundation. As of 2023, the building is owned by The Marygrove Conservancy and is operated as The School at Marygrove Elementary.

== Description ==
Immaculata High School is a three-story, flat-roofed L-shaped building constructed in a vernacular Modernstyle with Art Deco influences. The walls are brick clad with stone accents at the entrances and the roofline. entrances. The entrance is on one side through a set of double doors flanked by single doors. The entrance is recessed in an arched surround. A stone cross in the parapet is centered above the entrance. Flanking the entrance bay are narrow bays on each side, then four wider bays. The narrow bays contain one window on each floor, while the wider bays contain four windows divided by wide mullions at each floor. The bays are divided by brick pilasters.

The nearby convent is a three-story rectangular building with a flat roof. It is clad in sand-colored brick similar to that of the high school.
