= Our Lady of Sorrows High School (Farmington, Michigan) =

- 24040 Raphael Rd. Farmington, Michigan; United States

Information
- Type: Private, Coed
- Closed: 1971
- Grades: 9–12
- Colors: Purple and White
- Athletics conference: Catholic High School League
- Nickname: Lancers

Our Lady of Sorrows High School, commonly called Sorrows, was a coeducational Catholic high school in Farmington, Michigan, United States. It closed in 1971.
