= St. Paul High School (Grosse Pointe Farms, Michigan) =

Location
- Grosse Pointe Farms, Michigan; United States
- Coordinates: 42°23′42.1″N 82°53′41.7″W

Information
- Type: Private, Coed
- Established: 1927
- Closed: 1971
- Grades: 9–12
- Colors: Red and White
- Athletics conference: Catholic High School League
- Nickname: Lakers

St. Paul High School was a Catholic high school established in 1927 in Grosse Pointe Farms, Michigan, United States.
