= Harper Woods, Michigan =

- City
- City of Harper Woods
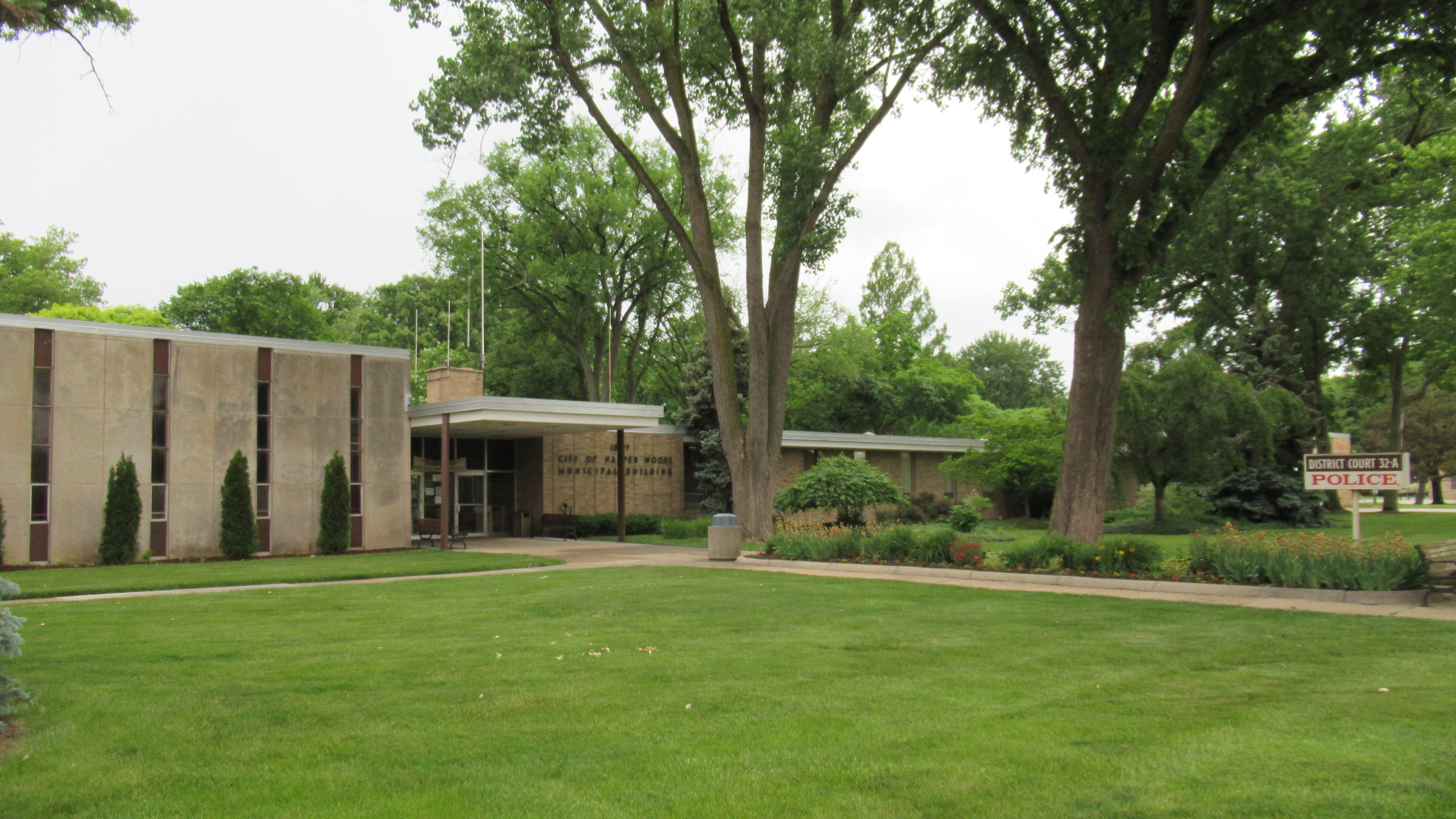
- Harper Woods Municipal Building

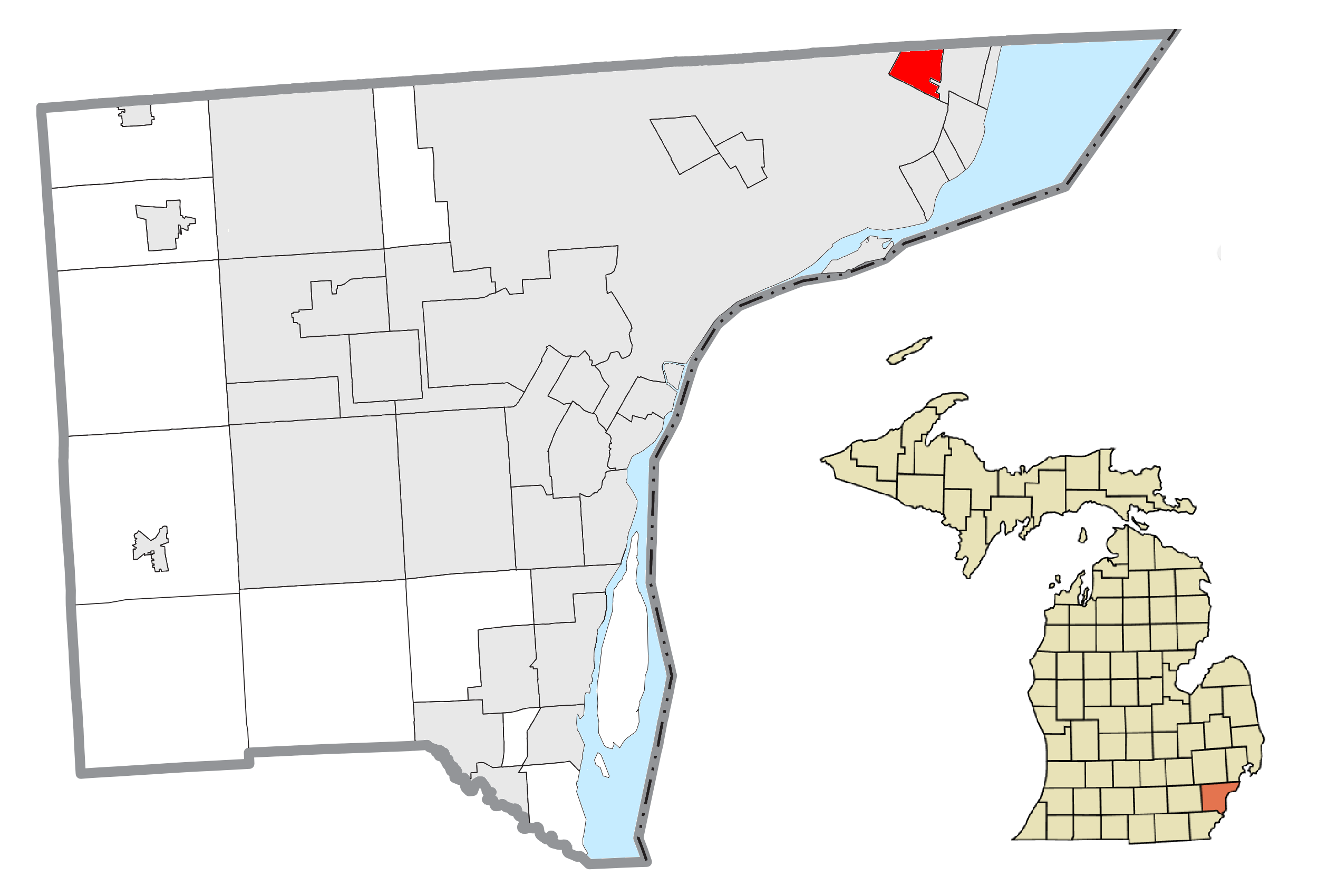
- Location within Wayne County

- Location within the state of Michigan Location within the United States
- Coordinates: 42°26′17″N 82°55′30″W
- Country: United States
- State: Michigan
- County: Wayne
- Incorporated: 1951

Government
  - Type: Council–manager
  - Mayor: Valerie Kindle (D)
  - Manager: Joseph Rheker
  - Clerk: Leslie Frank

Area
  - City: 2.63 sq mi (6.81 km^{2})
  - Land: 2.63 sq mi (6.81 km^{2})
  - Water: 0 sq mi (0.00 km^{2})
- Elevation: 587 ft (179 m)

Population (2020)
  - City: 15,492
  - Density: 5,891.7/sq mi (2,274.79/km^{2})
  - Metro: 4,285,832 (Metro Detroit)
- Time zone: UTC-5 (EST)
  - Summer (DST): UTC-4 (EDT)
- Zip code(s): 48225
- Area code: 313
- FIPS code: 26-36700
- GNIS feature ID: 0627822
- Website: harperwoodscity.org

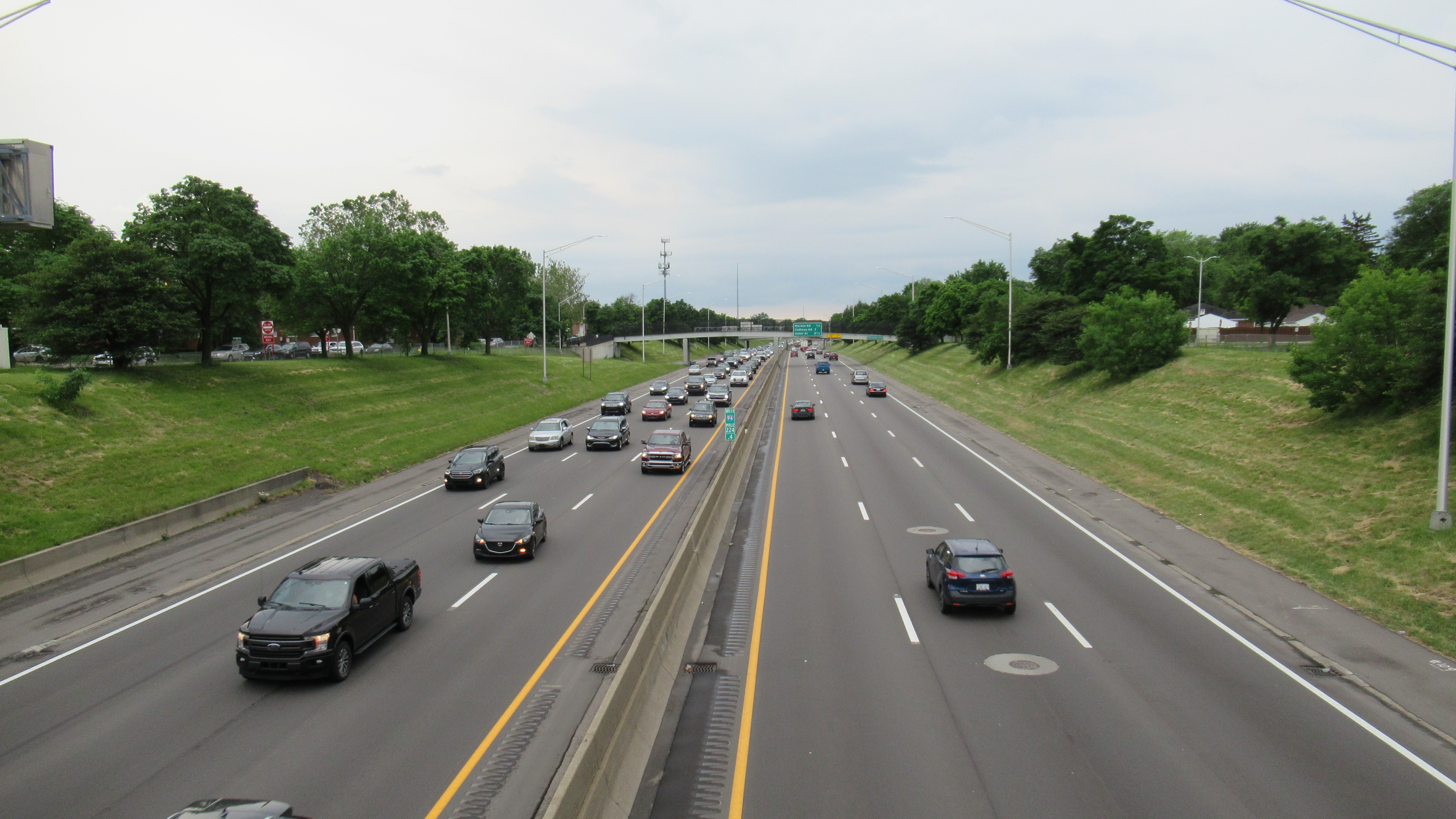
I-94 passing through Harper Woods

Harper Woods is a city in Wayne County in the U.S. state of Michigan. An inner-ring suburb of Detroit, Harper Woods borders Detroit to the north and east, roughly 9 miles (14.5 km) northeast of downtown Detroit. As of the 2020 census, the city had a population of 15,492.

== Etymology ==
According to the city's website, Harper Woods was so named because it was then a wooded area and because its main thoroughfare was Harper Avenue (named for Walter Harper, founder of Harper Hospital in Detroit).

== History ==
Harper Woods was incorporated as a city on February 19, 1951, from what was left of Gratiot Township. A charter commission was elected, a charter prepared and adopted, and a city council elected. The City of Harper Woods came into existence on October 29, 1951, when the charter took effect, and the first city council was sworn in.

The fledgling suburb faced the usual problems confronting new cities: schools, streets, sidewalks, water systems, drains, etc. In 1956, Harper Woods was the subject of a community service study by the Bureau of Government, Institute of Public Administration, at the University of Michigan.

The development of Harper Woods reflected the growth of metropolitan Detroit. In 1955, Interstate 94 (I-94) (which bisects the eastern part of the suburb) was approved, and construction on the Eastland Shopping Center began soon after. Eastland Center, one of the first outdoor malls in the Midwest, opened in 1957. Harper Woods continued to develop and grow over the decades. In 2001, Harper Woods celebrated its 50th anniversary.

=== Pension fund lawsuit ===
In September 2007, the City of Harper Woods Employees’ Retirement Scheme filed suit against British-based defense contractor BAE Systems. The suit alleges that BAE Systems executives funneled approximately $2 billion to Saudi ambassador Prince Bandar. The suit, which made news around the world, seeks governance changes to the BAE Systems board, and efforts to redress the losses due to this alleged corruption.

On December 29, 2009, the U.S. Court of Appeals rejected the Scheme's claim. Representatives for the Scheme later said that they would consider appealing to the Supreme Court.

=== City manager controversy ===
On June 14, 2021, the Harper Woods City Council voted 4–3 to not renew the contract of City Manager Joseph Rheker. The vote took place shortly after Rheker had returned from active duty with the Navy Reserve, but Mayor Valerie Kindle said that the council's decision was unrelated to his military service.

The council later offered the vacant city manager position to Monique Owens, who was mayor of Eastpointe at the time. At the special council meeting, the council did not allow residents to comment on the city manager hiring until after the council had already made its decision. However, Owens did not meet the conditions of the offer, and the city rescinded it the following day.

Owens later became embroiled in multiple scandals. In 2022, she was censured by the Eastpointe City Council, sued by residents who alleged that she violated their civil rights, and was found to have violated Eastpointe's ethics ordinance. In 2023, she pleaded no contest to making a false statement on a grant application for her business. She was also ousted as mayor in that year's primary election.

=== Cultural history ===
Though a relatively new city, Harper Woods has played a role in the cultural history of Metro Detroit.

For many years, the city was home to the East Side Drive-In (located at 19440 Harper Avenue, near 7 Mile Road), the first drive-in theater in Metro Detroit and one of the first in the Midwest. The East Side opened May 26, 1938, with The Big Broadcast of 1938, starring W. C. Fields and Dorothy Lamour. Automobile capacity in later years was listed at 970 vehicles. The East Side closed in 1977 and was demolished a year later.

The Hideout (located at 20542 Harper Avenue, at Beaufait Street) was a popular teen dance club in the mid-1960s. Many Detroit-area music acts - including some that would go on to national prominence - performed at the club. Among them were Bob Seger, Mitch Ryder, Ted Nugent, Glenn Frey (later of the Eagles), and Suzi Quatro. One performance at the club by the MC5 was described by their manager John Sinclair. The Hideout spawned a local record label, Hideout Records. A 2001 compact disc, Friday at the Hideout: Boss Detroit Garage Bands 1964-1967, documents the scene. One of the first bands to play at the Hideout, The Underdogs, wrote Friday Night at the Hideout. Dave Leone is credited as the writer on the record.

Another venue for local bands in the 1960s and 1970s was Notre Dame High School. According to various accounts, "All the Motown artists used to come and lip-sync to their records. Local neighborhood bands got to play live." Among the local performers of note who played dances and concerts at the school were The Amboy Dukes (featuring Ted Nugent), Bob Seger and the Last Heard, Frijid Pink, The Frost, Salem Witchcraft, Toby Redd, The Almighty Strut, and other acts.

U.S. Poet Laureate Donald Hall's 1970s poem, "Poem With One Fact", alludes to the city. Similarly, in 1986, the critically acclaimed crime fiction writer Loren D. Estleman unflatteringly portrayed the city in his Amos Walker novel Every Brilliant Eye. Among other works, the Detroit-area crime fiction writer Elmore Leonard mentions the city in his 2000 novel, Pagan Babies. Jeffrey Eugenides' bestselling 1993 novel The Virgin Suicides as well as his Pulitzer Prize-winning Middlesex also mention Harper Woods.

Betty Bahr, an early local television personality, Leonard H. Bahr, a fine press printer and publisher (Adagio Press), Helen Filarski, professional baseball player from 1945 to 1950, Laura Joh Rowland, author of historical mystery fiction, and Angela Ruggiero, 2006 Olympics bronze medal winner (ice hockey), have been among its better known residents. Dave Coulier, a popular television and voice actor, graduated from Notre Dame High School.

For decades, Eastland Center dominated the cultural and commercial profile of the suburb. The mall housed a celebrated work of public sculpture, "The Lion and Mouse", by Marshall Fredericks.

== Geography ==
Harper Woods is located between the City of Detroit, Eastpointe, St. Clair Shores, and Grosse Pointe Woods. Harper Woods borders Macomb County along 8 Mile Road on its north side. It is located along I-94. Eastland Center was the community's shopping center until it closed in 2021. Harper Woods has no rail access.

According to the United States Census Bureau, the city has a total area of 2.61 square miles (6.76 km^{2}), all land.

== Education ==
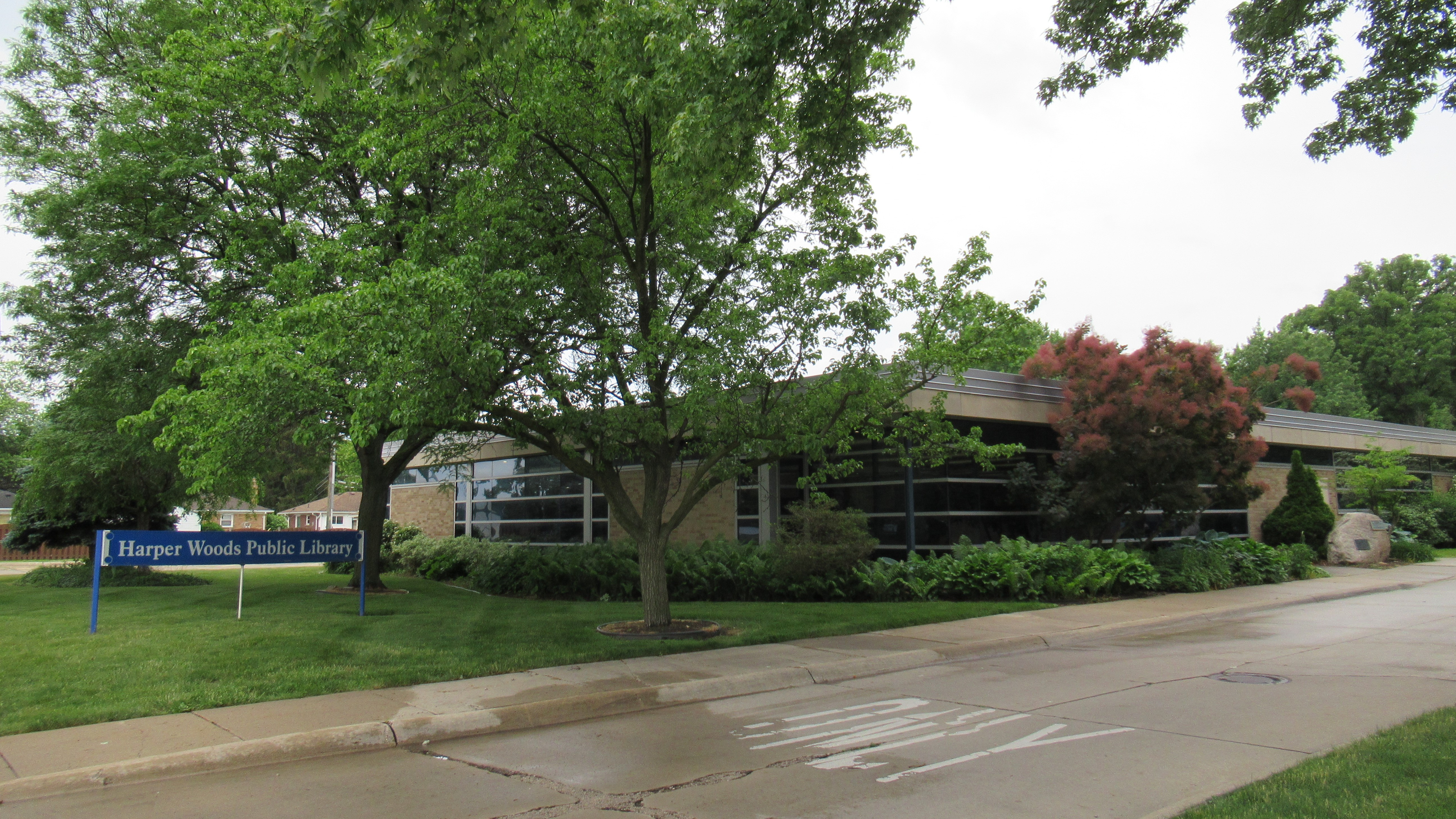
Harper Woods Public Library

=== Primary and secondary schools ===
==== Public schools ====
Harper Woods is served by two public school districts, the Harper Woods School District and the Grosse Pointe School District. The Harper Woods School District manages Beacon Elementary School (preschool-2), Tyrone Middle School (3-5), Triumph Middle School (6-8), and Harper Woods High School (9-12).

The Grosse Pointe School District manages Charles A. Poupard Elementary School in Harper Woods, and residents of Harper Woods in that school district are zoned to Poupard as well as two secondary schools in Grosse Pointe Woods: Parcells Middle School and Grosse Pointe North High School. In June 2019 the school board voted to close Poupard Elementary School as the numbers of students had declined.

Harper Woods is also home to the charter schools of Chandler Park Academy Elementary, Middle, and High Schools, and Starr Academy.

The Chandler Park Academy, a K-12 charter school, is in Harper Woods.

==== Private schools ====
During its history, Harper Woods was also home to the following (now defunct) parochial and private schools: St. Peter's Grade School, Our Lady Queen of Peace Elementary School, Lutheran High School East, Bishop Gallagher High School, Trinity Catholic High School, Heart Academy, Colin Powell Academy, and Notre Dame High School. In the fall of 2002, Bishop Gallagher and St. Florian High School in Hamtramck merged to form Trinity Catholic High School in Harper Woods. In 2005 the archdiocese announced that Trinity and Notre Dame, an all-boys parochial school in Harper Woods, would close. The all-girls Regina High School, once located in Harper Woods, moved to the nearby suburb of Warren in the fall of 2007.

=== Satellite college campuses ===
The Wayne County Community College University Square campus is located within the boundaries of Harper Woods.

Wayne State University has also used Harper Woods High School as a satellite campus; with a concentration on general education, Wayne State provides classes in the evening hours when the High School is not in session.

=== Public libraries ===
Harper Woods Public Library acts as the community's library system.

== Demographics ==
Historical population
Census	Pop.	Note	%±
1940	858		—
1950	9,148		966.2%
1960	19,995		118.6%
1970	20,186		1.0%
1980	16,361		−18.9%
1990	14,903		−8.9%
2000	14,254		−4.4%
2010	14,236		−0.1%
2020	15,492		8.8%
U.S. Decennial Census; 2010 2020

=== Racial and ethnic composition ===
Harper Woods city, Michigan – Racial and ethnic composition Note: the US Census treats Hispanic/Latino as an ethnic category. This table excludes Latinos from the racial categories and assigns them to a separate category. Hispanics/Latinos may be of any race.
Race / Ethnicity (NH = Non-Hispanic)	Pop 2000	Pop 2010	Pop 2020	% 2000	% 2010	% 2020
White alone (NH)	12,099	6,909	4,201	84.88%	48.53%	27.12%
Black or African American alone (NH)	1,449	6,451	10,199	10.17%	45.31%	65.83%
Native American or Alaska Native alone (NH)	45	31	40	0.32%	0.22%	0.26%
Asian alone (NH)	242	204	141	1.70%	1.43%	0.91%
Native Hawaiian or Pacific Islander alone (NH)	0	2	0	0.00%	0.01%	0.00%
Other race alone (NH)	22	20	61	0.15%	0.14%	0.39%
Mixed race or Multiracial (NH)	173	338	550	1.21%	2.37%	3.55%
Hispanic or Latino (any race)	224	281	300	1.57%	1.97%	1.94%
Total	14,254	14,236	15,492	100.00%	100.00%	100.00%

=== 2020 census ===
As of the 2020 census, Harper Woods had a population of 15,492. The median age was 37.4 years. 25.2% of residents were under the age of 18, and 13.6% were 65 years of age or older. For every 100 females, there were 85.7 males, and for every 100 females age 18 and over, there were 78.8 males age 18 and over.

100.0% of residents lived in urban areas, while 0.0% lived in rural areas.

There were 6,166 households in Harper Woods, of which 34.1% had children under the age of 18 living in them. Of all households, 28.0% were married-couple households, 20.7% were households with a male householder and no spouse or partner present, and 44.6% were households with a female householder and no spouse or partner present. About 32.1% of all households were made up of individuals, and 11.9% had someone living alone who was 65 years of age or older.

There were 6,596 housing units, of which 6.5% were vacant. The homeowner vacancy rate was 2.8%, and the rental vacancy rate was 6.8%.

=== 2010 census ===
As of the census of 2010, there were 14,236 people, 5,814 households, and 3,611 families residing in the city. The population density was 5,454.4 inhabitants per square mile (2,106.0/km^{2}). There were 6,504 housing units at an average density of 2,492.0 per square mile (962.2/km^{2}). The racial makeup of the city was 49.6% White, 45.6% African American, 0.2% Native American, 1.5% Asian, 0.4% from other races, and 2.7% from two or more races. Hispanic or Latino of any race were 2.0% of the population.

There were 5,814 households, of which 34.2% had children under the age of 18 living with them, 35.2% were married couples living together, 21.8% had a female householder with no husband present, 5.2% had a male householder with no wife present, and 37.9% were non-families. 33.5% of all households were made up of individuals, and 12.4% had someone living alone who was 65 years of age or older. The average household size was 2.42 and the average family size was 3.11.

The median age in the city was 37.5 years. 25.9% of residents were under the age of 18; 8% were between the ages of 18 and 24; 27.4% were from 25 to 44; 25.7% were from 45 to 64; and 12.8% were 65 years of age or older. The gender makeup of the city was 46.2% male and 53.8% female.

=== 2000 census ===
As of the census of 2000, there were 14,254 people, 6,292 households, and 3,756 families residing in the city. The population density was 5,521.1 inhabitants per square mile (2,131.7/km^{2}). There were 6,514 housing units at an average density of 2,523.1 per square mile (974.2/km^{2}). The racial makeup of the population was 84.9% Non-Hispanic white, 10.2% African-American, 0.34% Native American, 1.0% Non-Filipino Asian, 0.7% Filipino, 0.01% Pacific Islander, 0.40% from other races, and 1.39% from two or more races. Hispanic or Latino of any race were 2% of the population. 14.4% were of German, 14.0% Italian, 12.5% Polish, 10.4% Irish and 5.0% English ancestry according to Census 2000.

There were 6,292 households, out of which 27.4% had children under the age of 18 living with them, 44.1% were married couples living together, 12.0% had a female householder with no husband present, and 40.3% were non-families. 35.5% of all households were made up of individuals, and 16.8% had someone living alone who was 65 years of age or older. The average household size was 2.24 and the average family size was 2.94.

In the city, the population was spread out, with 22.4% under the age of 18, 6.0% from 18 to 24, 32.8% from 25 to 44, 18.8% from 45 to 64, and 19.9% who were 65 years of age or older. The median age was 38 years. For every 100 females, there were 86.6 males. For every 100 females age 18 and over, there were 81.1 males.

The median income for a household in the city was $46,769, and the median income for a family was $55,065. Males had a median income of $46,747 versus $34,138 for females. The per capita income for the city was $24,900. About 2.9% of families and 5.1% of the population were below the poverty line, including 5.0% of those under age 18 and 7.1% of those age 65 or over.

== Highways ==
- I-94 runs south–north through the eastern portion of the city with two exits: exit 224B Allard Avenue–Eastwood Drive (exit only) and exit 225 Vernier Road (M-102).
- M-102 runs west–east at the northern edge of the city and has its eastern terminus at I-94. Within the city, M-102 is briefly known as 8 Mile Road before turning slightly south, where the designation changes to Vernier Road for a short length until I-94.
