= Trinity Catholic High School (Michigan) =

- Harper Woods, Michigan; United States

Information
- Type: Private, Co-educational
- Established: 2002
- Closed: 2005
- Grades: 9–12
- Enrollment: 163 (in 2005)
- Colors: Red, White and Blue
- Athletics conference: Catholic High School League
- Nickname: Lancers
- Accreditation: Michigan Association of Non-Public Schools

Trinity Catholic High School was a coeducational Roman Catholic high school in Harper Woods, Michigan, United States, and was part of the Roman Catholic Archdiocese of Detroit.

The school formed in the Fall of 2002 when St. Florian High School in Hamtramck, Michigan and Bishop Gallagher High School in Harper Woods, Michigan merged.

The school had 163 students enrolled at the time of its closing in 2005.

== Notable alumni ==
- DePrice Taylor, executive for the Kansas City Current and former Director of Community Engagement for Kanbe's Markets
