= Notre Dame High School (Harper Woods, Michigan) =

- Crest of Harper Woods Notre Dame High School

Location
- 20254 Kelly Road; Harper Woods, Michigan 48225-1203; United States; 42°26′47.3″N 82°56′30.9″W

Information
- Type: Private, All-Male
- Motto: Valor Virtusque (Valor and Courage)
- Religious affiliation: Roman Catholic
- Established: 1954
- Status: closed
- Closed: 2005
- Grades: 9-12
- Colors: Green and White
- Song: Notre Dame Our Mother
- Fight song: Notre Dame Victory March
- Nickname: Fightin' Irish
- Newspaper: The Shield, The Leprechaun
- Yearbook: The Juggler
- Website: Notre Dame Alumni Association Notre Dame Alumni Association

Notre Dame High School was a Catholic, all–male, non–residential college preparatory school in the Detroit suburb of Harper Woods, Michigan. It was closed in 2005, with 295 students, after more than 50 years due to budget concerns, according to the Archdiocese of Detroit. The school had about 300 students at the time of closure, down from almost 1000 during its peak enrollment levels. It was founded in 1954 and operated by the Marist Fathers and Brothers, and the first class graduated in 1958.

Throughout its existence, the school was located next door to Regina High School, a Catholic, all–female school; and Lutheran High School East. Lutheran High School East closed in 2004 and Regina High School moved to Warren, Michigan in 2007.

== Closing ==
The Archdiocese of Detroit announced in early March 2005 that 18 Detroit–area schools—including Notre Dame High School—would be shut down because declining enrollment and an escalating budget deficit. Archdiocese spokesman Richard Laskos called the decision "irrevocable" despite protests from family, students and alumni of the school.

The Friends of Notre Dame Incorporated filed a lawsuit to keep the school open, but a Wayne County Circuit Court judge ruled against them. Entertainer Bill Cosby, who had spoken in support of keeping the school open, was scheduled to attend a meeting with activists protesting the school's closure, but canceled his appearance.

It was used as a filming location for the 2012 film Red Dawn. Mark Binelli, author of Detroit City is the Place to Be, wrote that the school cafeteria was used as the catering hall for the employees of the film production.

== Notable alumni ==
- David Bonior, former United States Congressman
- Dave Coulier, comedian, entertainer, and actor from Full House.
- Doug Weight, a former Olympic hockey player and centre for the St. Louis Blues of the NHL
- John Blum, former NHL defenseman, 1981-1995
- Dave Debol, former NHL hockey player
- Mark Cendrowski, TV director
- Matt Servitto, Actor from The Sopranos and Your Pretty Face Is Going to Hell
- Ben Blackwell, writer, drummer, co-founder of Third Man Records
