= Our Lady of the Lakes Catholic School (Michigan) =

Location
- 5495 Dixie Highway; Waterford, Michigan 48329; United States
- Coordinates: 42°41′59″N 83°23′45″W

Information
- Type: Private, Coeducational
- Religious affiliation: Roman Catholic
- Established: 1960
- Founder: Frederick Delaney
- Head of school: Robert Jansen
- Teaching staff: 28.8 (on a FTE basis)
- Grades: PK–12
- Enrollment: 552 (2013-14)
- Colors: Blue and White
- Athletics conference: Catholic High School League
- Nickname: Lakers
- Yearbook: Lochmara
- Website: www.ollonline.org/school

Our Lady of the Lakes Catholic School is a private, Roman Catholic school in Waterford Township, Michigan, United States. It is one of only 5 PK-12 schools in the Roman Catholic Archdiocese of Detroit.

The high school was established in 1960 and shares its Waterford campus with Our Lady of the Lakes Elementary School and Middle School. Also sharing the campus is Our Lady of the Lakes parish church. Our Lady of the Lakes parish school was established in 1956 as an elementary school.

Our Lady of the Lakes is accredited by the Michigan Association of Non-Public Schools

== Campus ==
Groundbreaking occurred on October 28, 1956 with the school opening in 1958. Its first class graduated in June 1962. In 1992 a new addition with a common area, another gymnasium, and four classrooms opened.

== Athletics ==
The Lakers are members of the Michigan High School Athletic Association (MHSAA) and compete in the Detroit Catholic High School League (CHSL) as well as the Catholic Youth Organization (CYO) for grades 5-8.

Sports offered at Our Lady of the Lakes High School include:

- Baseball
  - State champion – 1991
- Basketball
  - Girls state champion - 2010, 2011, 2012
- Bowling
- Cross Country
- Football
  - State champion - 2002
- Golf
  - Boys state champion - 1986, 1989, 1990, 1997
- Hockey
- Soccer
  - Girls state champion - 2010
- Softball
  - State champion - 1983, 1987, 1992, 1993, 1999, 2000, 2003, 2004
- Tennis
- Track
- Volleyball

The Lakers' eight softball state championships are the most by any MHSAA school in that sport (as of 2015).

== Notable alumni ==
- Ryan Riess ('08), 2013 World Series of Poker Main Event Champion
- Earl Boyea, fifth bishop of the Roman Catholic Diocese of Lansing
