= St. Rita High School (Detroit) =

- State Fair St. Detroit, Michigan; United States

Information
- Type: Private, Coed
- Established: 1928
- Closed: 1975
- Grades: 9–12
- Colors: Green and White
- Athletics conference: Catholic High School League
- Nickname: Vikings

St. Rita High School was a coeducational Catholic high school in Detroit, Michigan, United States. The school was operated by the Sisters of St. Joseph. It closed in 1975
