= Marian High School (Michigan) =

Location
- 7225 Lahser Road; Bloomfield Hills, Michigan 48301; United States; 42°32′4″N 83°15′46″W

Information
- Type: Private, All-Girls
- Religious affiliation: Roman Catholic
- Established: 1959
- President: Heather Greig Sofran '96
- Principal: Stacey Cushman
- Grades: 9–12
- Enrollment: 370 (2023-2024)
- Student to teacher ratio: 15
- Colors: Mustang Blue and Strong Yellow
- Athletics conference: Catholic High School League and Michigan High School Athletic Association
- Nickname: Mustangs
- Accreditation: North Central Association of Colleges and Schools
- Publication: The Marian Monitor
- Yearbook: The Marian Way
- Affiliation: Sisters, Servants of the Immaculate Heart of Mary, Monroe, MI
- Website: www.marian-hs.org

Marian High School is a private, college-preparatory Roman Catholic high school for girls in Bloomfield Hills, Michigan in Metro Detroit.

== History ==
Marian High School, founded in 1959, is sponsored by the Sisters, Servants of the Immaculate Heart of Mary. In 2014, Marian High School fired Barbara Webb, a lesbian chemistry teacher, for becoming pregnant via IVF.

== Academics ==
Accredited by the North Central Association, the academic program provides college preparatory classes, 26 honors classes, and 16 Advanced Placement courses.

== Demographics ==
The demographic breakdown of the 493 girls enrolled in 2013-14 was:

- Native American/Alaskan - 0.2%
- Asian/Pacific islanders - 1.4%
- Black - 5.7%
- Hispanic - 1.4%
- White - 89.1%
- Multiracial - 2.2%

== Athletics ==
The interscholastic athletic teams, known as the Mustangs, participate in the Catholic High School League. The following MHSAA sanctioned sports are offered:

*Basketball
  - MHSAA - 1988, 1992, 1996, 1998, 2014, 2015
  - CHSL - 1986, 1987, 1988, 1992, 1993, 1996, 1997, 2001, 2002, 2008, 2009, 2010, 2013, 2015, 2016, 2018, 2019, 2022
- Field Hockey
  - CHSL - 2002, 2007, 2008, 2009, 2010, 2013, 2014, 2016, 2017, 2018, 2019, 2023
- Cross Country
  - CHSL - 2000, 2001
- Golf
  - CHSL - 1992, 1993, 1994, 2002, 2010, 2011, 2019, 2020
  - MHSAA - 2019, 2020
- Lacrosse
  - CHSL: 2007, 2009, 2010, 2011, 2012, 2013, 2014, 2016
  - MHSAA: 2001
- Skiing
  - CHSL: 1992, 1993, 1994, 2002, 2008, 2009, 2010, 2011, 2012, 2013, 2014, 2015, 2016, 2022
  - MHSAA - 2010, 2011, 2014
- Soccer
  - CHSL: 1987, 1988, 1989, 1990, 2003, 2004, 2005, 2006, 2007, 2008, 2009, 2010, 2011, 2012, 2014, 2015, 2017, 2018, 2019, 2022
  - MHSAA - 2003, 2004, 2009,2010, 2012, 2017, 2018, 2019, 2021
- Swimming and diving
  - CHSL - 1990
  - MHSAA - 2007, 2008, 2014, 2022
- Tennis
  - CHSL - 1975, 1976, 1977, 1978, 1979, 1980, 1981, 1982, 1983, 1984, 1985, 1986, 1987, 1988, 1989, 1990, 1991, 1994, 1995, 1996, 1997, 1998, 2004, 2009, 2010, 2011, 2012, 2013, 2014, 2015, 2016, 2017, 2018, 2019
  - MHSAA - 2010, 2013, 2016
- Volleyball
  - CHSL - 1978, 79, 87, 95, 2001, 2002, 2003, 2004, 2005, 2006, 2008, 2009, 2012, 2014, 2020, 2021, 2022
  - MHSAA - 2009, 2010, 2020, 2021, 2022
- PomPon
  - CHSL: 2006, 2021, 2022
  - MAPP C/D: 2024
- Figure Skating
  - MIHS: 2012, 2013

== Notable alumni ==
- Mary Kay Henry, Class of 1975; International President of SEIU
- Madison Packer, Class of 2010; Professional ice hockey player
