= Sacred Heart High School (Roseville, Michigan) =

Sacred Heart High School Roseville, Michigan
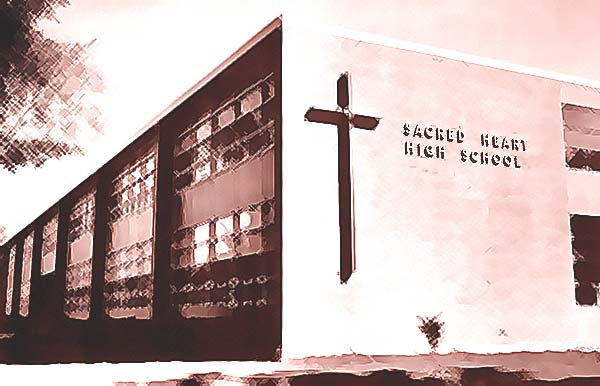
- SHHS Circa 1968

Location
- Roseville, (Macomb County), Michigan 48066; United States
- 42°30′07″N 82°55′43″W

Information
- Type: Private, Coeducational
- Religious affiliation: Roman Catholic
- Founded: 1955
- Founder: Fr. Dennis P. Tighe
- Closed: 1971
- Authority: Archdiocese of Detroit
- Grades: 9–12
- Colors: Red & White
- Yearbook: Corview

Sacred Heart High School was a Roman Catholic high school in Roseville, Michigan. It operated under the jurisdiction of the Archdiocese of Detroit.

== History ==
=== Initial attempt ===
When Father Louis Van Straelan arrived in 1879 as the new pastor he recognized the need for a Catholic school in the community.

In September 1882 Sacred Heart opened its new schoolhouse to twelve students in grades one through eight.

When Father Van Straelan was transferred the decision was to not replace him with a resident pastor. His departure ended the school program.

=== Second attempt ===
In 1918 another new pastor, Father Dennis P. Tighe, also recognized the educational needs of the community. He immediately had the church basement divided into classrooms, and hired three lay instructors.

In 1920 he received permission to construct a new school, and contacted the Mother Superior of the Sisters, Servants of the Immaculate Heart of Mary (IHM) for permission to have three nuns teach at the new school.

In 1921, with the construction of the school building complete, the nuns began teaching 130 students in grades 1 through 8.

The Archdiocese of Detroit Archives, and the IHM chronicles seem to accept 1921 as the date Sacred Heart School was established.

In 1928 a ninth grade was added, in 1930 and 1931 10th and 11th grades were added respectively. The school remained at grades 1 through 11 until 1936 when the impact of global depression forced the elimination of the secondary (high school) grades.

By the mid-1950s the economy and confidence in it had recovered enough that by 1955 enrollment in the elementary grades had grown to over 1,100 students. Ground was broken for a new high school and ninth grade classes began in September 1955.

The school added grades 10, 11, and 12 over the next 3 years to accommodate the advancing students.

Sacred Heart High School remained open until 1971 when mounting debt, and the death of the pastor, Rev. Raymond Clancy, forced the parish to close the school at the end of the 1970–71 school year.
