= Dominican High School (Detroit) =

- 9740 McKinney Street, Detroit, Michigan; United States

Information
- Type: Private, All-Girls
- Motto: m
- Religious affiliation: Roman Catholic (Adrian Dominican Sisters)
- Established: 1940; 86 years ago
- Closed: 2005; 21 years ago
- Grades: 9–12
- Campus: m
- Campus size: m
- Colors: Black and Gold
- Athletics conference: Catholic High School League
- Nickname: Ravens
- Rival: Regina High School
- Accreditation: m
- Endowment: m
- Tuition: m
- Information: m
- Website: m

Dominican High School was a high school in Detroit Michigan, United States. The school was established by the Adrian Dominican Sisters of the Congregation of the Most Holy Rosary in 1940 (86 years ago) and was closed in 2005 (21 years ago).
