= Cardinal Mooney Catholic High School (Michigan) =

Private Catholic high school in Marine City, Michigan

Location
- 660 South Water Street; Marine City, (St. Clair County), Michigan 48039; United States
- Coordinates: 42°42′46″N 82°29′41″W

Information
- Type: Private
- Religious affiliation: Catholic
- Established: 1977
- Principal: Jennifer Stachelski(interim principal)
- Teaching staff: 15.8 (on an FTE basis)
- Grades: 7–12
- Enrollment: 182 (2017-18)
- Student to teacher ratio: 11.5
- Colors: Black and red
- Athletics conference: Catholic High School League
- Nickname: Cardinals
- Rival: Gabriel Richard
- Accreditation: Cognia
- Newspaper: The Tweet
- Website: www.cardinalmooney.org

Cardinal Mooney Catholic High School is a private, Catholic high school in Marine City, Michigan. It is located in the Roman Catholic Archdiocese of Detroit.

== History ==
The school is named for Edward Mooney, the first Archbishop of Detroit elevated to the College of Cardinals.

Cardinal Mooney Catholic High School was founded in 1977 at St. Peter's Parish in Mount Clemens, Michigan. In 1983, it moved to a former public school in Harrison Township, Michigan. The school moved to its present location in 1990, and an addition was added in 2009.

== Academics ==
Cardinal Mooney has been accredited by Cognia (or its predecessors) since 1995.

== Notable alumni ==
- Eric Spoutz, art dealer and historian
- Andrew Beeler, politician
