= Southgate Shopping Center =

Shopping center in Michigan

- Southgate Shopping Center sign (Eureka Road entrance) in August 2006
- Location: Southgate, Michigan
- Coordinates: 42.1977°N 83.1908°W
- Address: Eureka and Trenton Roads
- Opened: September 1957
- Architect: Charles N. Agree
- Num. of stores: 30+ at peak
- Num. of anchor tenants: 3
- Floors: 1
- Public transit: SMART 125, 160, 830

Southgate Shopping Center is a shopping center located at the southeast corner of Eureka and Trenton Roads in Southgate, Michigan. Completed by 1958, it was one of the first major strip malls in the southern Detroit suburbs until the nearby Southland Center opened in 1970. At its peak, the center housed over thirty stores.

== History ==
=== Construction and opening ===
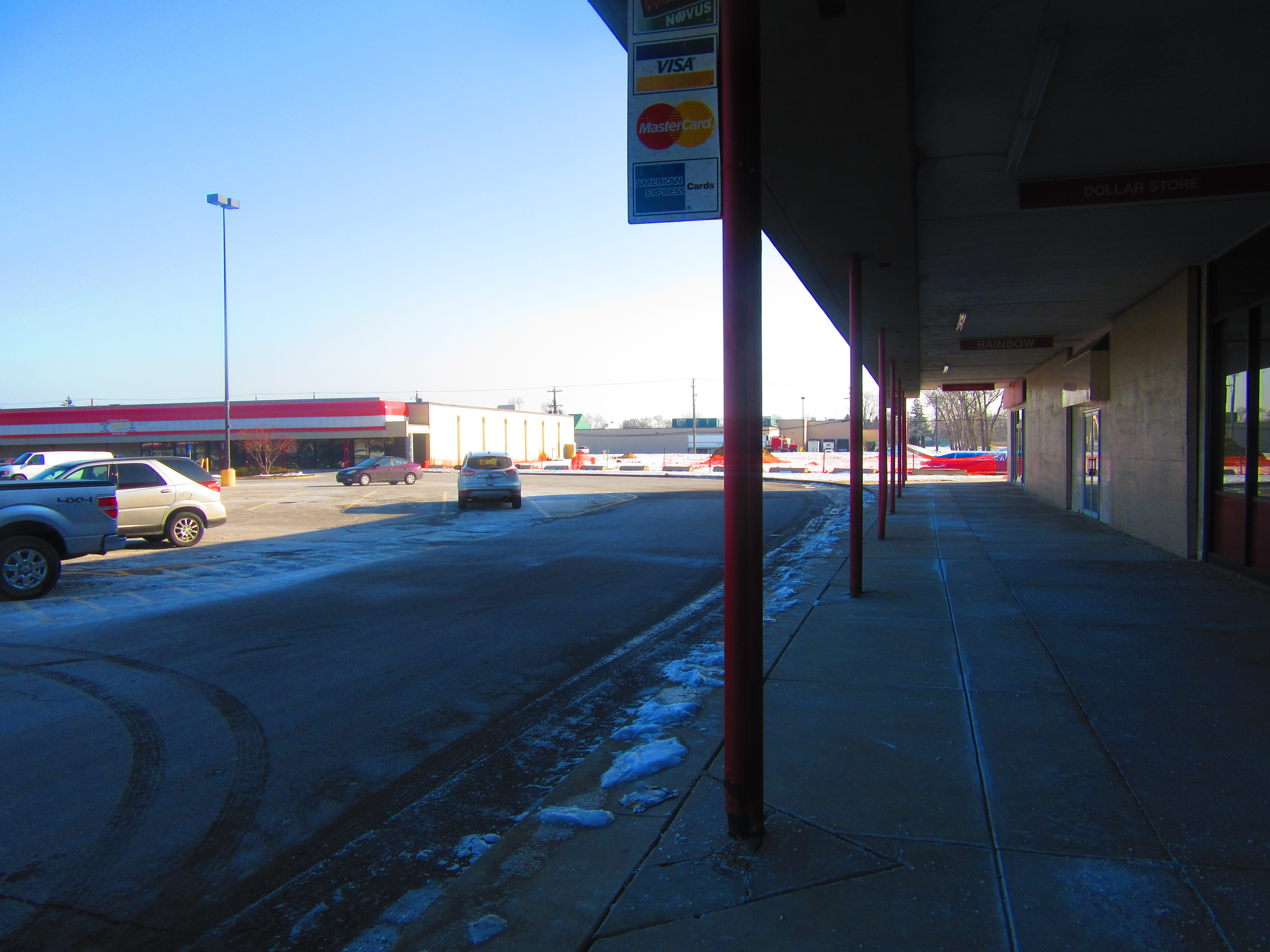
Looking towards the Montgomery Ward site from a sidewalk adjacent to the Eureka Road-facing storefronts in January 2015. The Montgomery Ward site is now occupied by Market Center Park.

As early as 1952, the Realty Mortgage and Investment Corporation of Detroit announced that a multimillion-dollar Southgate Center would be built at Eureka and Trenton Roads, and that "space has already been let to many Michigan chain stores, including Kinsel Drugs, Federal's, Wrigley Stores, S. S. Kresge and others," with construction scheduled to begin in the fall of 1952. Southgate's sister center, Eastgate Center (located at 10½ Mile and Gratiot in Roseville) was announced at the same time, with both to have Federal and Kresge as anchors.

Five years later, Southgate Shopping Center was erected in what was then the lone remaining section of Ecorse Township. The 40-acre (160,000 m^{2}) center was designed by architect Charles N. Agree in an L-shape: where one row of stores, near the Eureka entrance, faces Trenton Road and the other row, near the Trenton Road entrance, faces Eureka. There were large signs bearing the name "Southgate" at both entrances (the current neon sign off of Eureka Road was erected in the late 1970s). The mall's trademark was a 135 ft (41 m). water tower, located next to the future Federal's store, close to Trenton Road.

Coincidentally, the remainder of Ecorse Township was annexed in 1958 and became the city of Southgate; the name so chosen "because of the shopping center then under consideration," according to Ecorse Township Supervisor Thomas Anderson.

=== First businesses ===
Wrigley's supermarket was the first tenant, opening for business in September, 1957. Federal's department store opened the following month in a separate 80,000 sq ft (7,400 m^{2}) building next to the center. The official grand-opening for the center was held October 16, 1957, featuring a ribbon-cutting ceremony with Supervisor (and later Southgate's first mayor) Anderson, music by a German polka band, and radio remotes from the parking lot (including Robin Seymour of WKMH, later host of the Swingin' Time program on CKLW-TV and eventually WXON-TV).

Two five and dime stores, Woolworth's and Kresge's (billed as the chain's "691st store") opened their doors in late 1957 along with various other businesses, including Winkleman's, a local well-known clothier.

The two wings of the L-shaped structure were joined in 1958 with the construction of the mall's anchor tenant, Montgomery Ward, which opened its doors in February, 1959. Easily the largest business in the center at 133,000 sq ft (12,400 m^{2}), a separate auto shop along Eureka Road was also built that year.

=== Southgate Shopping Center in later years ===
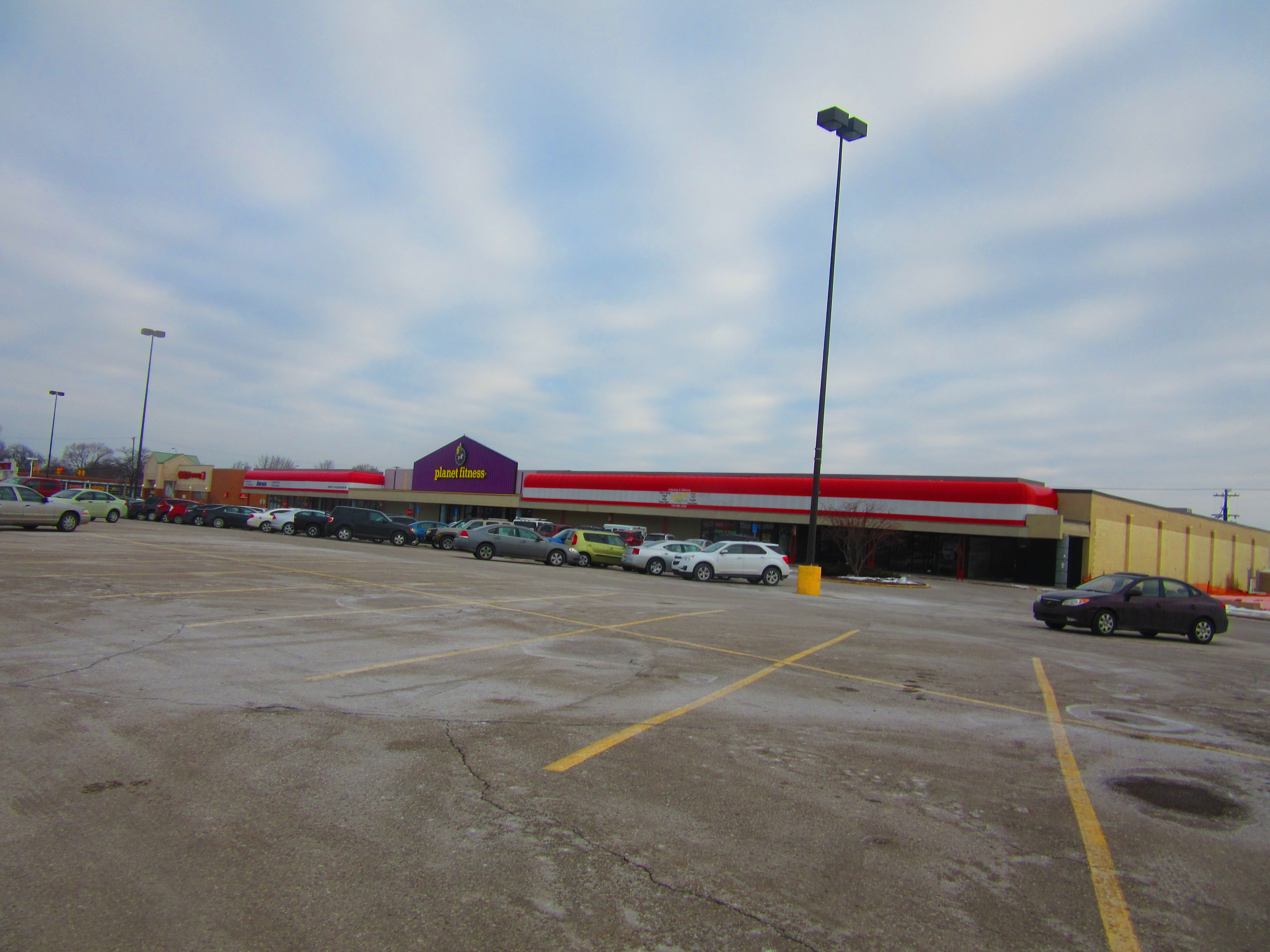
The section housing the Trenton Road-facing storefronts in 2015. The Montgomery Ward site is on the right.

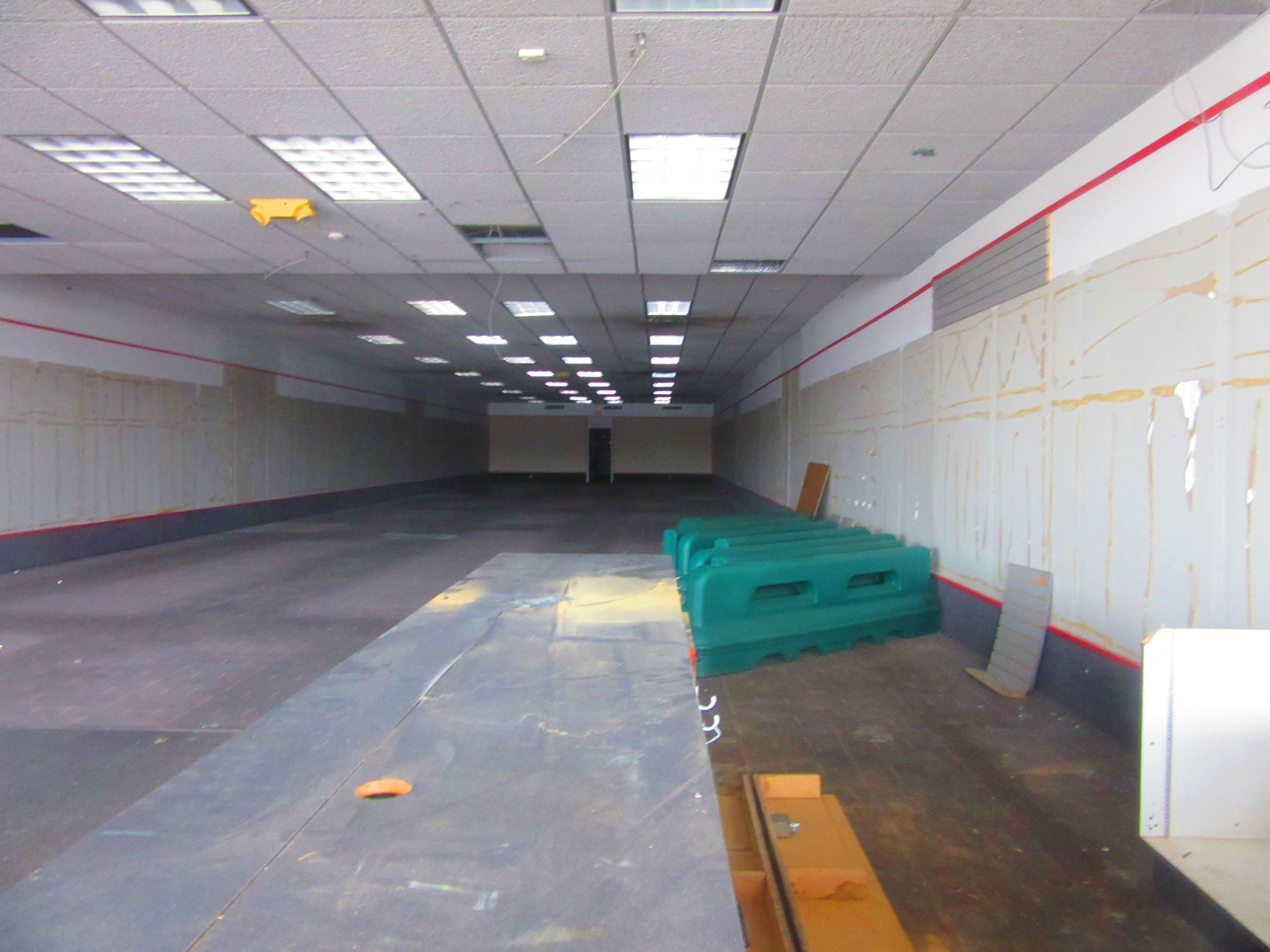
Interior of an empty storefront, which was previously a dollar store and before that a Harmony House, in 2015. This storefront is now occupied by the PASC Art Studio.

Many of the smaller, mom-and-pop oriented shops began to vacate in the early 1980s due to changing economic conditions. Kresge's closed its dime store in 1982, as its subsidiary, Kmart, was located just east of the center (in a separate building that today houses a Dunham's Sports). Tri-State Furniture opened in that space later that year, and was eventually subdivided in 1990 into Old Country Buffet, which later closed on January 18, 2012, and replaced later that year by All-American Buffet, itself closing at the start of 2018; and Fashion Bug, which closed in 2011; both spaces were eventually recombined with the 2020 opening of the World of Games entertainment center and bar.

The first physical change to the mall occurred in 1992, when seven storefronts were razed to make room for a Farmer Jack grocery store, adjacent to Service Merchandise. Other separate buildings housing locations for Applebee's and Taco Bell were constructed that same year lining Eureka Road (another separate building east of the Ward's Auto Center had been built in 1989, during a remodeling of the mall).

By the end of the 1990s, the economic climate and the condition of nearby neighborhoods was changing once again, as big-box retailers began overtaking the business of older, established malls, combined with the beginning of the expansion of the decline of Detroit through Lincoln Park into Southgate. Woolworth closed its Southgate store in January 1994, and Discovery Zone opened in its place later that year, occupying the space until being replaced by Sears Hardware by 1997. Construction of the MJR Southgate Digital Cinema 20 megaplex theater began in late 1997 and officially showed its first movies on November 6, 1998. Another small portion of the strip building at the Eureka Road entrance would be demolished in 1997 to permit the construction of an Arbor Drugs pharmacy, which was still under construction when CVS Corporation announced that it would be buying Arbor out on February 9, 1998, resulting in the store opening in April 1999 as a CVS location.

The center's big blow came during Christmas of 2000, as Montgomery Ward liquidated its assets and closed their store in early 2001 (the building has since been razed). Service Merchandise also began downsizing its operations considerably, eventually taking only half the space in its building. It closed its catalog showroom business by 2003 (later to re-emerge as an online retailer, similar to Montgomery Ward) and razed the building in 2004 and the water tower in 2005. Sears Hardware closed in July 2006. The Farmer Jack store was shuttered (along with the rest of the chain) a year later, in July 2007, leaving the mall without an anchor tenant.

Additional outlot buildings were still being constructed, though. In 2006, a Chili's restaurant was built near the Trenton Road entrance. Construction began in mid-2007 to move the Trenton Road entrance south about 50 feet (15 m) to allow for the building of an Old Chicago restaurant, which opened later that year. The area formerly occupied by Service Merchandise would eventually become the location of a branch of Ecorse-based credit union Downriver Community Federal Credit Union, breaking ground in June 2019 and opening in June 2020, replacing a smaller branch in Wyandotte. Old Chicago closed in March 2024, and will be replaced by HopCat in the summer of 2025.

== Re-development ==
In 2006, with the Wards building still vacant, mall owner Michael Sisskind stated he was "working to put together a flexible plan for the building, or perhaps tear it down to attract new retailers."

In August 2007, the News-Herald reported that the center was a candidate to house a Walmart Supercenter, which would be the 50th supercenter in Michigan, but only the third in Metro Detroit. Sisskind, however, expressed doubts that Wal-Mart would build on the property. The supercenter would likely have taken over the Wards plot, with additional sections of the center being torn down, as was the case with the construction of Farmer Jack.

Citing the fact that the Walmart Supercenter concept was new to Metro Detroit (at that time, two existing stores in Taylor and Woodhaven were being expanded into supercenters), Sisskind explained:

I don't think there's going to be any Walmart... That doesn't mean if talks picked up months from now and I was unsuccessful in renting out the space, that it couldn't happen then... I just want to rent out my center. And it appears that Wal-Mart is not my answer, at least not right now."

Walmart ended up erecting a new superstore in Southgate at the intersection of Eureka Road and Dix-Toledo Road (on the site of the Michigan Drive-In and later the Children's Palace/Best Buy and Builder's Square/Home Quarters-anchored Southtowne Crossing Shopping Center), opening it on September 14, 2011.

In a State Of The City address on January 25, 2012, Southgate Mayor Joseph Kuspa stated the Wards building would be demolished in Spring, 2012, to make way for multi-functional public space. This was a result of a survey conducted by New York-based Project For Public Spaces. Demolition was expected to commence in May, 2012, and the land turned over to the city in the summer.

== Water tower ==
A water tower was constructed shortly before the center was opened, located behind Federal's near the Trenton Road entrance. During construction it was noted that the "water tower, which will service the stores in Southgate, is 135 feet (41 m) high and has a total capacity of 100,000 gallons. By opening day, which is October 16, the tower will be painted white and will be adorned with a huge 'S'."

When Service Merchandise took over the building in 1978 after the Federal's chain liquidated, the tower was repainted with the store's original "S-M" logo. The mall had its fire-suppression system upgraded in the 1980s, thereby forgoing the need for the tower, which later became an eyesore. It was restored and repainted in 2001 thanks to the letter-writing efforts of an elementary school girl, but was razed only four years later to help facilitate future construction on the Service Merchandise land.

== Southgate Shopping Center today ==
Though most recent construction has occurred outside of the original mall (MJR, Downriver Community Federal Credit Union, HopCat, Chili's, Buffalo Wild Wings, Applebee's, and Taco Bell), stores that remain inside the strip itself include skateboard/comic shop Anime to Skateboards, Downriver Gymnastics, Innovative Training Solutions, fashion retailer Style U Boutique, the Smoothie Stop cafe, used electronics store PayMore, Planet Fitness, the Metro Ju Jitsu martial arts school and its affiliated Metro After School educational facility, Bath & Body Works, Mira Hair Salon, World of Games, STEP Thrift Store, and the PASC Art Studio. The Montgomery Ward site became Market Center Park, which opened in 2016. Panera Bread, which was located adjacent to Buffalo Wild Wings in the former Ward's Auto Center, moved to a former Rio Bravo restaurant further west on Eureka in Taylor on November 2, 2014, the former location now houses Angelina's Mexican Restaurant. Ukazoo Books, which opened in a space formerly occupied by the defunct Borders Express in 2011, closed in December 2013 and was replaced in the fall of 2016 by Oak Street Health, an independent primary care clinic. CVS Pharmacy closed in July 2022 as part of a plan by that company to close 900 stores over a three-year period.
