= Fort Street–Pleasant Street and Norfolk & Western Railroad Viaduct =

- Fort Street—Pleasant Street and Norfolk & Western Railroad Viaduct
- Formerly listed on the U.S. National Register of Historic Places
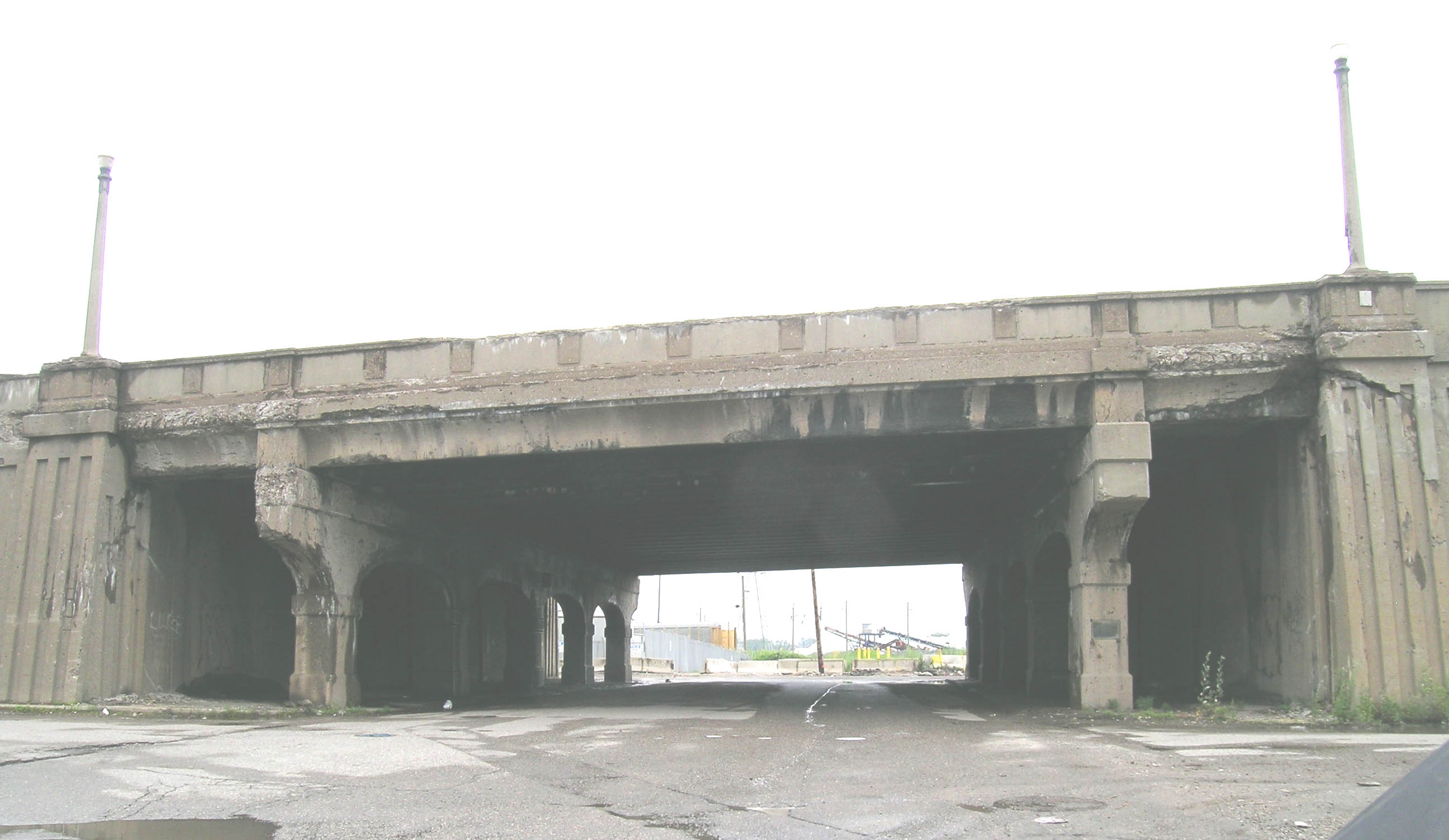
- Pleasant Street at Fort, looking north

- Location within Michigan Location within the United States
- Interactive map
- Location: Detroit, Michigan
- Coordinates: 42°17′4″N 83°8′54″W
- Built: 1928
- Architect: Wayne County Road Commission
- MPS: Highway Bridges of Michigan MPS
- NRHP reference No.: 00000116

Significant dates
- Added to NRHP: February 18, 2000
- Removed from NRHP: August 8, 2022

The Fort Street–Pleasant Street and Norfolk & Western Railroad Viaduct in Detroit, Michigan, is a bridge carrying six lanes of Fort Street over both Pleasant Street and multiple tracks comprising the Norfolk Southern Railway Detroit District (the former Wabash Railway mainline) and Conrail Shared Assets Lincoln Secondary and Junction Yard Secondary (respectively formerly operated by the Pennsylvania Railroad and the New York Central Railroad) lines on the border of the Boynton and Oakwood Heights neighborhoods just west of the Rouge River. It was listed on the National Register of Historic Places in 2000. The bridge underwent massive repairs and other construction in late 2010 and throughout much of 2011, which included narrowing the Fort Street boulevard north of the viaduct into a six-lane undivided road with a left-turns-only lane. The bridge was removed from the NRHP in 2022.

== History ==
The area along the Fort Street corridor near Pleasant Street was transformed early in the 20th century from a residential community to a substantially industrial center. An undated newspaper clipping from the time on the "passing of Fort Street West" laments, "[o]nce a social center, it is now a great business artery whose splendid mansions have given way before the march of industrial progress". Among other industrial centers in the area, the Ford River Rouge Complex is just upstream from the Fort Road (as it was named at the time) river crossing, making both Fort Road and the Norfolk & Western tracks main transportation arteries in Detroit.

In the 1920s, Fort Road was one of the roads chosen for upgrade to a "superhighway". These roads were upgraded by the city, county and state to feature 204-foot (62 m) right-of-ways, central medians, and nighttime lighting. Additionally, with the growth in vehicular traffic in the early 20th century, railroad-highway intersections increasingly became sources of both travel delays and accidents. On 1928, the Wayne County Road Commission and the Michigan State Highway Department announced plans to separate rail and vehicle grades, with railways contributing substantially to the cost. The Fort Road bridge project was the first to be undertaken.

However, the project had substantial design considerations, resulting in a large cost and a lengthy planning process. The bridge was required to be long enough to permit passage of both two city streets and twelve railroad tracks at an oblique angle; it had to be wide enough to accommodate two 40-foot (12 m) paved traffic surfaces for the Fort Superhighway. Construction finally began in summer 1928, and the structure was completed in 1930.

The resulting structure, according to a Wayne County Road Commission at the time, included an "ornamental concrete handrail" supporting "ornamental concrete lamp posts" so that "the entire project will be adequately and beautifully lighted". In subsequent years, the urn-shaped balusters of the original railing have been replaced by solid concrete panels. However, the other components of the railings, including the octagonal lamp posts, remain intact. The loss of the balusters is unfortunate, but the overall scale and significance of the bridge outweighs the minor loss.

== Significance ==
The Fort Street Viaduct is noteworthy for both its design and size. It was normally cheaper to build a railroad bridge over the street rather than the other way around. However, the large number of tracks at the Fort Road crossing would have required a substantial subway. The Fort Street Viaduct, which stretches 2,800 feet (850 m) in length and includes an 80-foot (24 m) roadway, was by far the largest and most ambitious structure included in the 1920s grade separation plan. This bridge exemplifies the importance attached to the grade separation program, as planners tried to increase vehicle safety and decrease congestion.

== Gallery ==
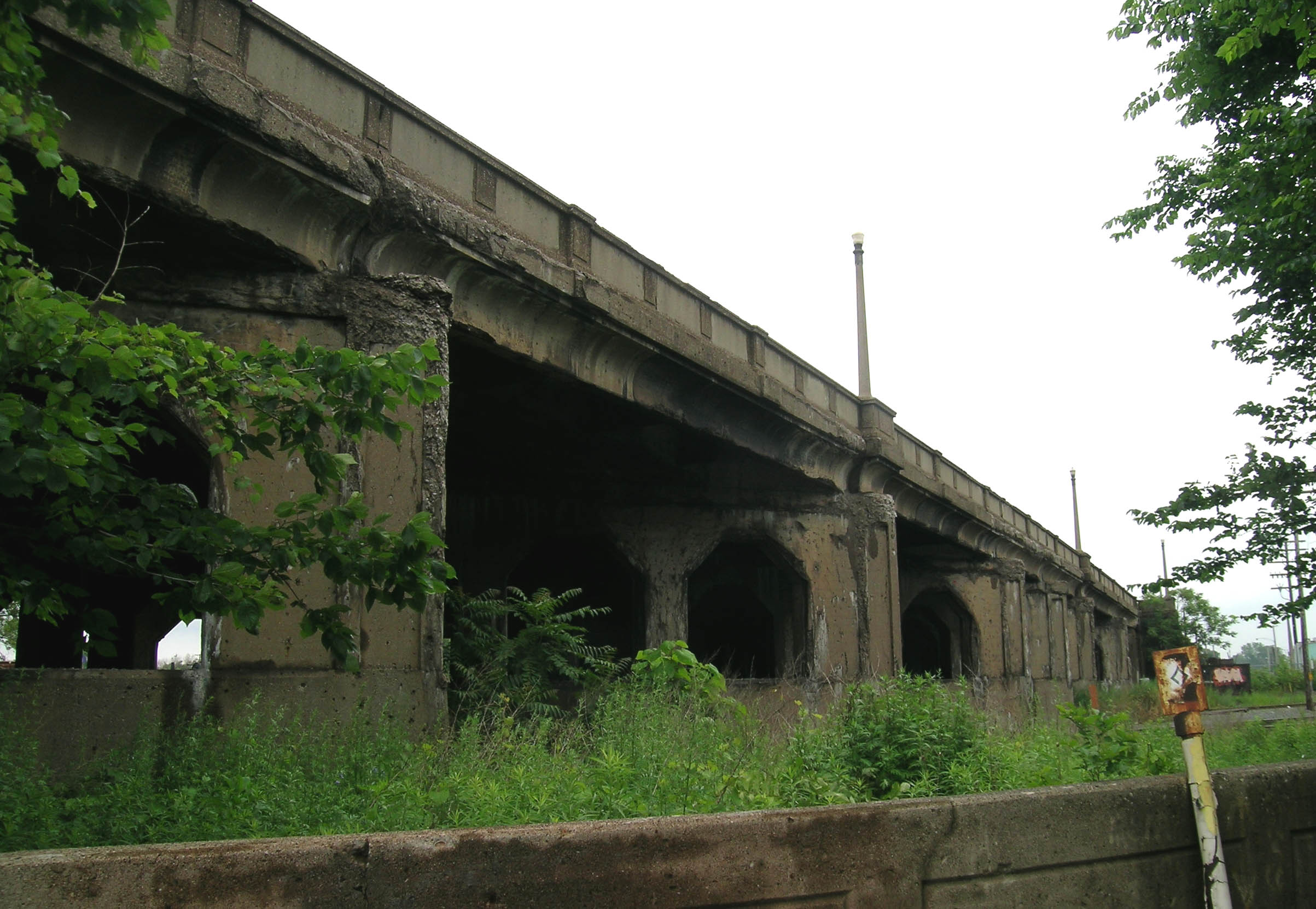
Section of bridge over the Norfolk & Western Railroad

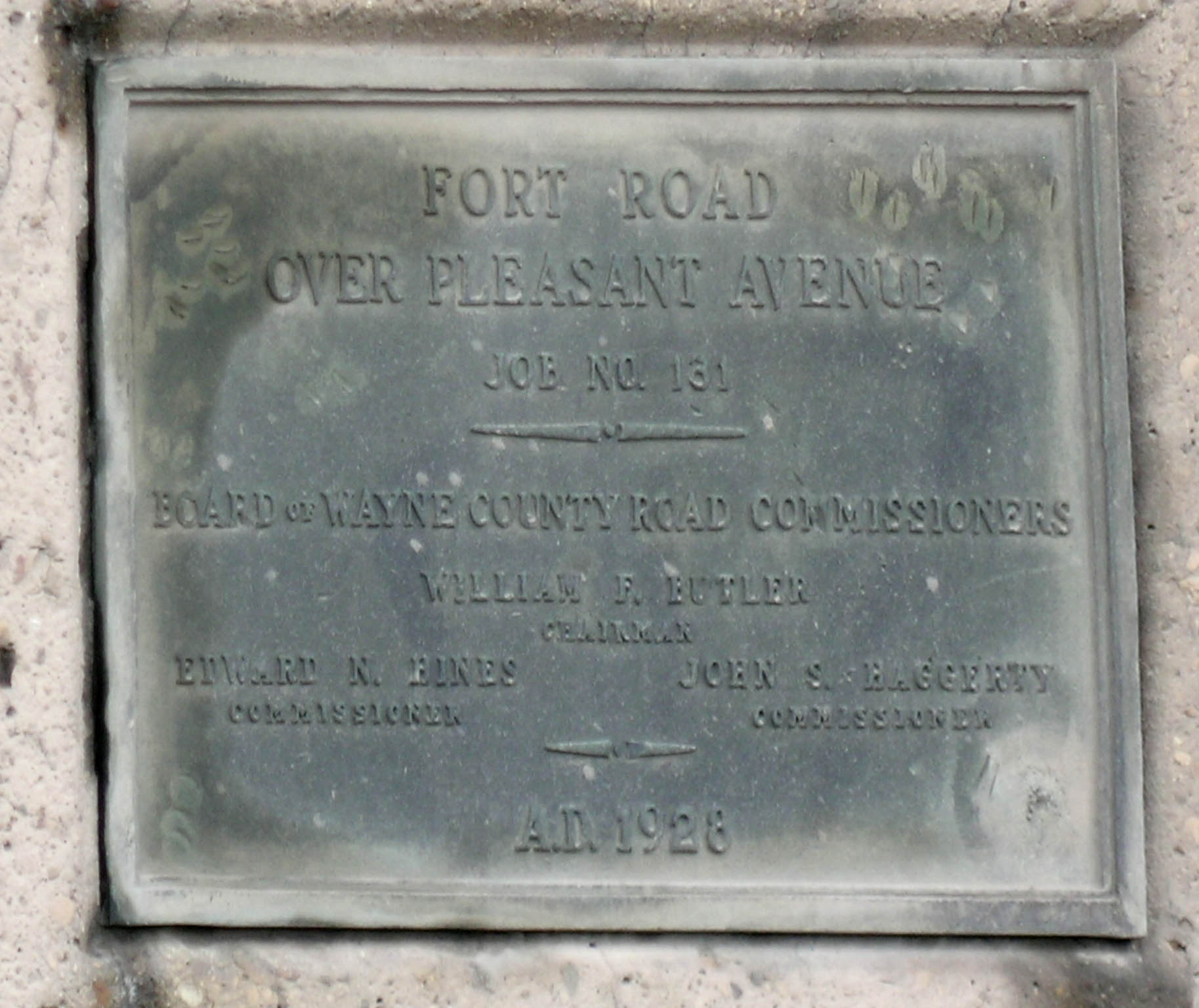
Plaque on Fort St bridge over Pleasant Street

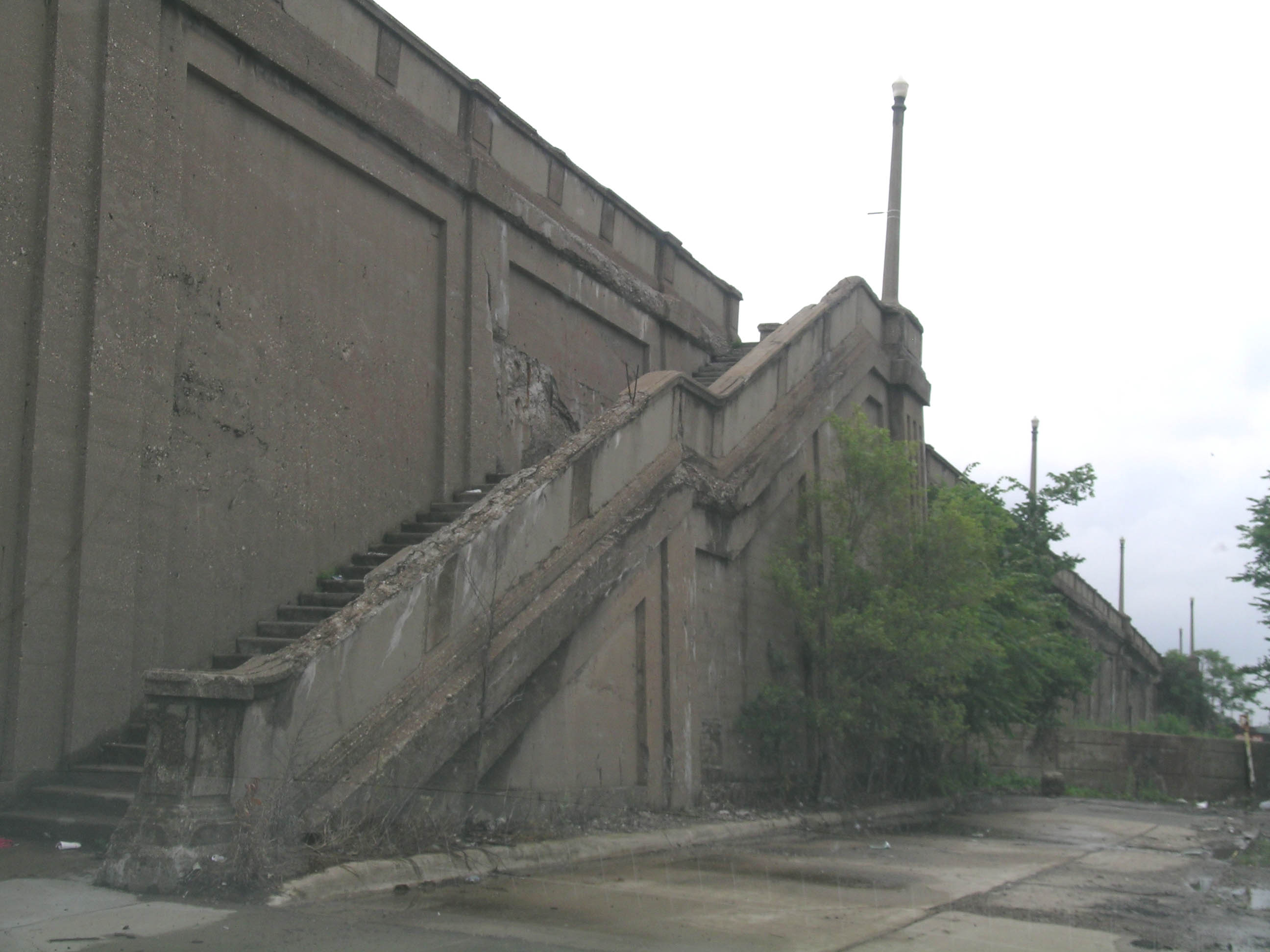
Stairs leading up from Pleasant Street to Fort Street
