= Old Homestead, Southgate, Michigan =

Old Homestead
- Neighborhood of Southgate, Michigan
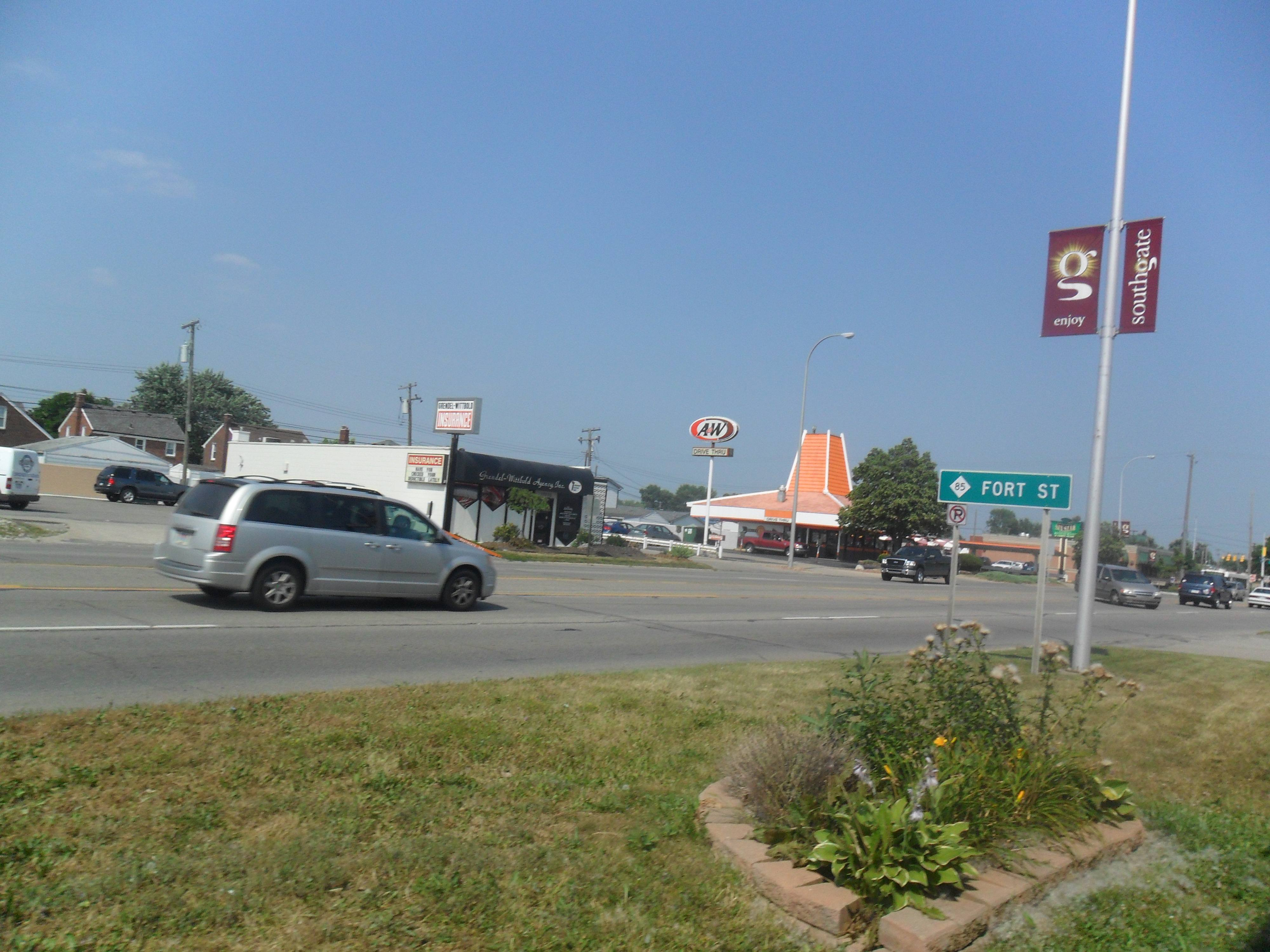
- Businesses along Eureka Road in Old Homestead

- Location of Old Homestead within the city of Southgate Location of Old Homestead in the state of Michigan
- Coordinates: 42°12′N 83°11′W
- Country: United States
- State: Michigan
- County: Wayne
- City: Southgate
- Platted as part of Ecorse Township: 1923
- Incorporated as part of Southgate: 1958

Area
  - Land: 0.336 sq mi (0.87 km^{2})

Population (2010)
  - Total: 1,263
  - Density: 3,770/sq mi (1,454/km^{2})
- Time zone: UTC-5 (EST)
  - Summer (DST): UTC-4 (EDT)
- ZIP code(s): 48195
- Area code: 734

Old Homestead is a neighborhood on the east side of the Metro Detroit suburb of Southgate, Michigan. Usually, Old Homestead is bordered by Superior Street to the north, Eureka Road to the south, M-85 (Fort Street) to the east and either Trenton Road or Burns Street to the west.

== History ==
Old Homestead was originally platted in 1923 as a subdivision of Ecorse Township, however, for approximately the next two decades, it continued to remain mostly agricultural land. From this original plat, only four of the residential streets-Sycamore, Chestnut, Commonwealth and Superior Streets-retain their original names. In 1958, the remaining areas of Ecorse Township were incorporated as the city of Southgate-this included Old Homestead.

== Public transportation ==
The Suburban Mobility Authority for Regional Transportation operates three bus routes along the borders of Old Homestead. Route #125 travels from Detroit Metropolitan Wayne County Airport along Eureka Road and Fort Street to River Rouge via Southland Center and during weekday rush hours continues into downtown Detroit. Route #160 travels along Eureka Road along the southern edge of Old Homestead, connecting it to Trenton, downtown Wyandotte, Wayne County Community College District's Downriver Campus and Southland Center. Route #830 is a weekday-rush-hour park and ride service that runs along Trenton Road in Old Homestead and connects Trenton and downtown Detroit.
