= Southgate Community School District =

School district in Michigan, United States

Address
- 13940 Leroy Street Southgate, Michigan, 48195; United States

District information
- Type: Public
- Grades: PreK–12
- NCES District ID: 2632340

Students and staff
- Students: 3,219 (2020–2021)
- Teachers: 200.08 (on an FTE basis)
- Staff: 187.39 (on an FTE basis)
- Student–teacher ratio: 16.09:1

Other information
- Website: www.southgateschools.com

The Southgate Community School District is a school district in Southgate, Michigan.

The district serves the entire city of Southgate, Michigan and Allen Park south of the Sexton-Kilfoil Drain. The Board of Education office is located at 13940 Leroy in Davidson Middle School.

== History ==
During the summer of 1982, the Heintzen and McCann school districts merged into one and was named the Southgate Community School District.

== Schools ==
The District includes the following schools:

- Allen Elementary School
- Fordline Elementary School
- Grogan Elementary School
- North Pointe IB Elementary
- Shelters Elementary School
- Davidson Middle Academy
- Davidson Middle School
- Asher Alternative High School
- Southgate Anderson High School
