= Southgate Tower =

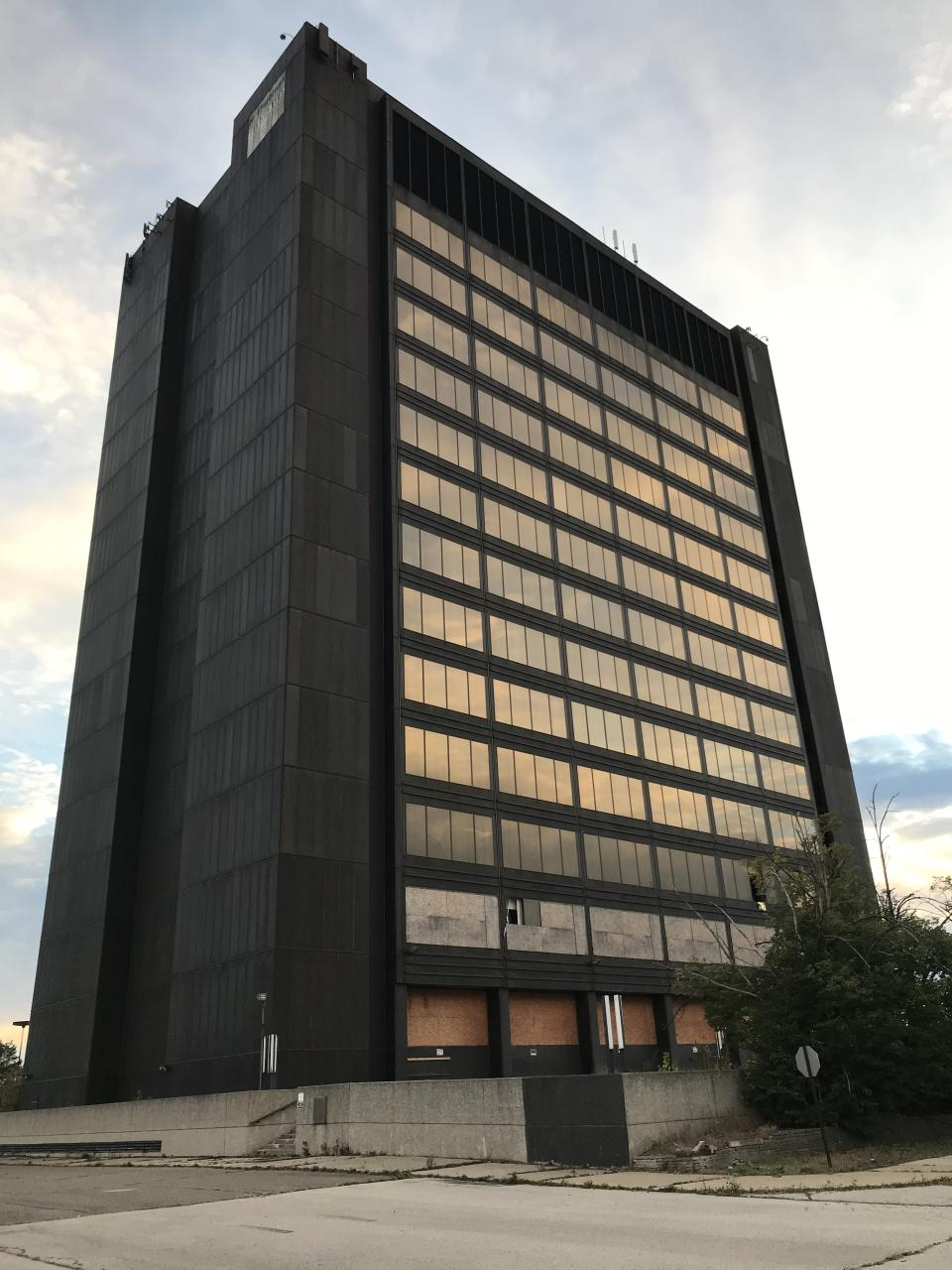
- Southgate Tower in October 2021

General information
- Type: office, retail (former); Residential (planned)
- Location: Southgate-Detroit, United States
- Coordinates: 42°11′19″N 83°11′28″W
- Completed: 1973

Height
- Roof: 60.96 m (200.0 ft)

Technical details
- Floor count: 13 stories

Southgate Tower is a high-rise office building at 16333 Trenton Road in Southgate, Michigan. Since its completion, it has been the tallest building in the Downriver area of Wayne County, Michigan, as well as the tallest building between Detroit and Toledo, Ohio. A large portion of office space in the building was occupied by PNC Financial Services. Until October 18, 2013, a PNC Bank branch also operated in the building.

It was initially constructed in 1972 and completed in 1973 by Lincoln Park-based Security Bank to house their headquarters. Since its completion, Southgate Tower's bank tenant has changed, first in 1993 to First of America Bank, then in 1997 to National City Bank and finally to PNC in early 2010. in Late 2021, reports of its conversion into Apartments if a zoning change was approved came to light, and eventually construction began in Mid-2023, with planned completion being mid-2025.

The office building is easily accessible from M-85 (Fort Street), as a driveway connects that road to the building's parking lot. Southgate Tower is easily visible from many locations in Southgate and adjacent communities.

== See also ==
- Architecture of metropolitan Detroit
- List of tallest buildings in Detroit
- Downriver
- Top of Troy, another Detroit-area high-rise office building where PNC operates as the major tenant.
