= Southgate Anderson High School =

High school in Southgate, Michigan

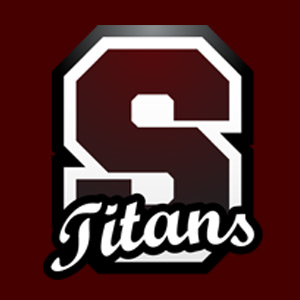

Location
- 15475 Leroy Street; Southgate, Michigan 48195; United States
- Coordinates: 42°11′28″N 83°12′43″W

Information
- Type: Public
- Founded: 1982
- School district: Southgate Community School District
- Superintendent: Sharon Irvine
- Principal: Tara Randall
- Teaching staff: 49.40 (on a FTE basis)
- Grades: 9-12
- Enrollment: 986 (2023-2024)
- Student to teacher ratio: 19.96
- Colors: Burgundy and Silver
- Mascot: Stan the Titan
- Website: anderson.southgateschools.com

Student assessments
- 2021–22 school year Change vs. prior year

M-STEP 11th grade proficiency rates (Science / Social Studies)
- Advanced %: 5.2 / ≤5
- Proficient %: 16.2 / –
- PR. Proficient %: 16.2 / 57.1
- Not Proficient %: 62.4 / 17.1

Average test scores
- SAT Total: 895.7 (▼ −76.1)

Southgate Thomas J. Anderson High School is a public high school in Southgate, Michigan, United States. A part of the Southgate Community School District, it serves Southgate and a section of Allen Park.

== History ==
Southgate, Michigan formerly had two high schools in the city, Southgate High School and Schafer High School.

After the 1981–82 school year, the Heintzen and McCann school districts consolidated into one called Southgate Community School District. Schafer High School closed and combined operations with Southgate High School, which was renamed Southgate Anderson High School that summer by the school board. The new name was in honor of Thomas J. Anderson, the first mayor of Southgate. On September 8, 1982, Southgate Anderson High School reopened its doors with approximately 1,400 students.

From 1982 to 2013, Southgate Anderson only held grades 10-12 while Davidson Middle School held Freshman. In September 2013, Southgate Anderson once again held grades 9–12.

== Campus ==
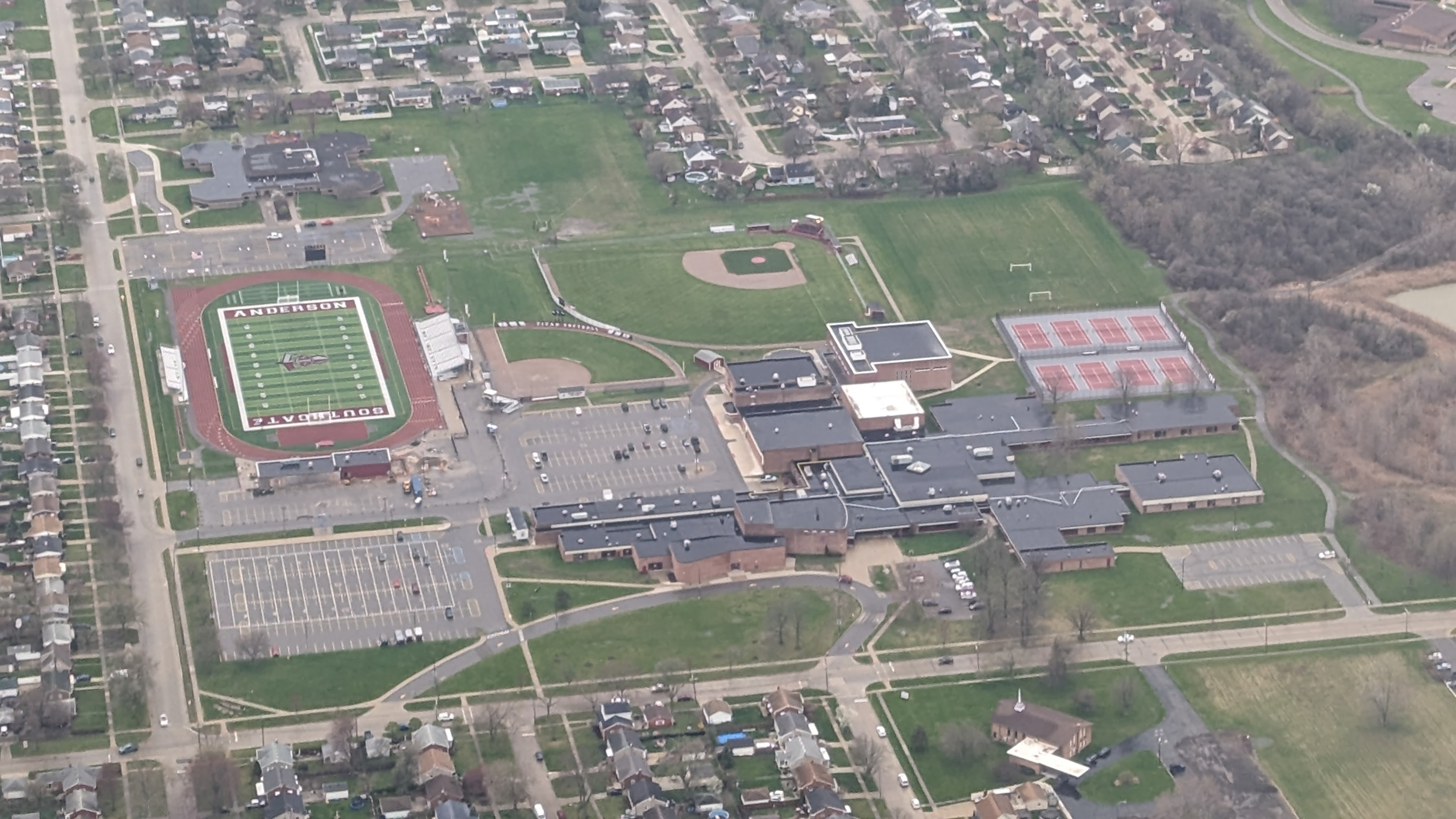
Aerial view of the school

== Demographics ==
The demographic breakdown of the 1,363 students enrolled in 2023-24 was:

- Male - 53.37%
- Female - 46.63%
- Native American/Alaskan Natives - 0.30%
- Asian - 2.03%
- Pacific islanders - 0.10%
- Black - 10.65%
- Hispanic - 13.59%
- White - 71.31%
- Multiracial - 2.03%

50.71% of the students were eligible for free or reduced lunch.

== Notable alumni ==
- Jeff Jones- Former pitcher for Oakland A's and former Detroit Tigers Pitching Coach
- Rick Down- Former Minor League Baseball player and former MLB hitting coach
