= Boynton–Oakwood Heights =

Boynton – Oakwood Heights
- Neighborhoods of Detroit
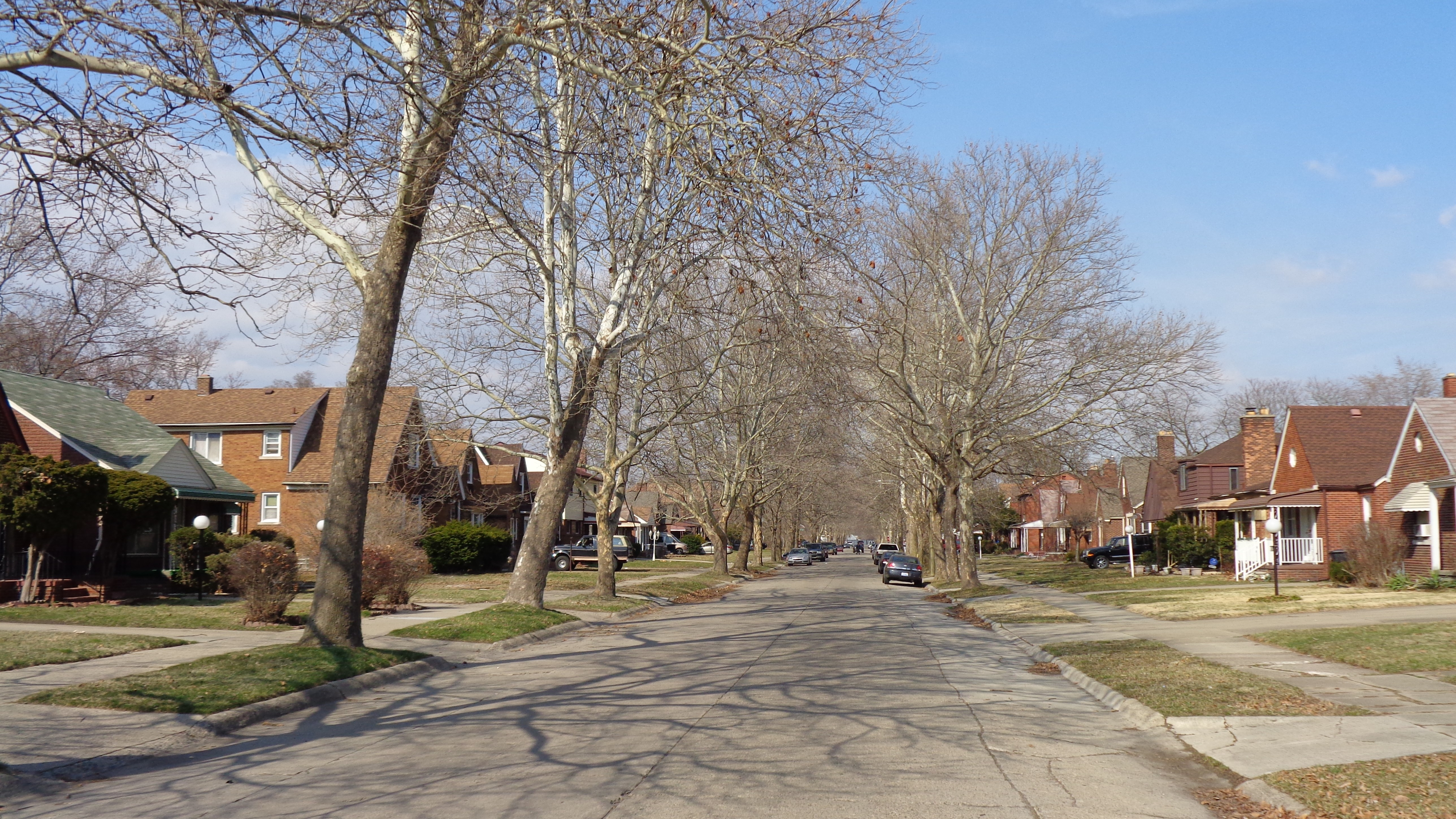
- Annabelle Street in the Boynton neighborhood

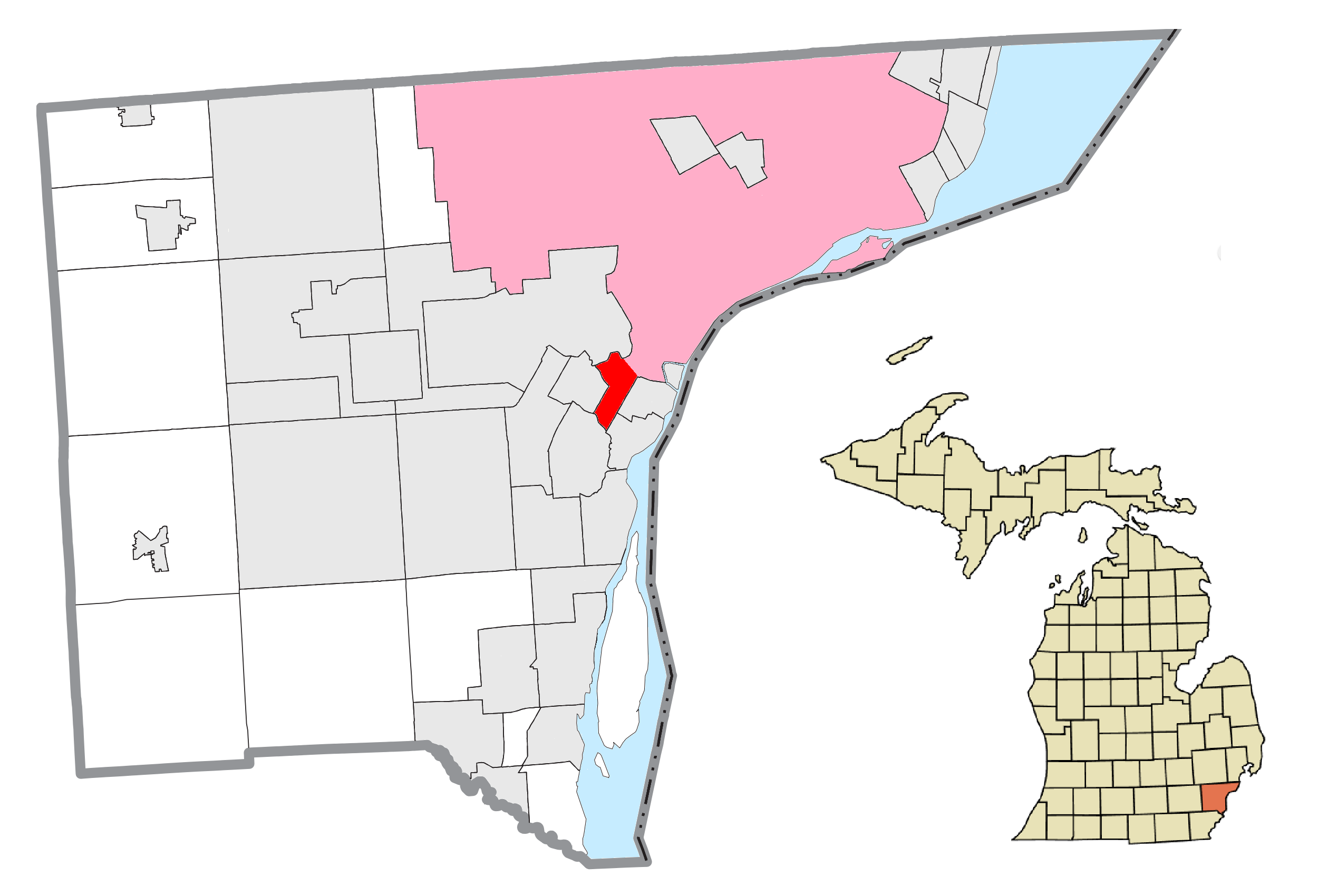
- Location of Boynton–Oakwood Heights (red) within the city of Detroit (pink) in Wayne County

- Location within the state of Michigan Location within the United States
- Coordinates: 42°16′31″N 83°09′05″W
- Country: United States
- State: Michigan
- County: Wayne
- City: Detroit

Area
  - Land: 2.80 sq mi (7.25 km^{2})
- Elevation: 585 ft (178 m)

Population (2010)
  - Total: 8,210
  - Density: 3,154.3/sq mi (1,217.9/km^{2})
- Time zone: UTC-5 (EST)
  - Summer (DST): UTC-4 (EDT)
- ZIP code(s): 48217 (Detroit)
- Area code: 313

Boynton and Oakwood Heights are the two southernmost neighborhoods of the city of Detroit in the U.S. state of Michigan. The two neighborhoods occupy the only portions of Detroit located south of the River Rouge.

According to the U.S. Census Bureau at the 2010 census, the two neighborhoods had a total area of 2.80 square miles (7.25 km^{2}) and a population of 8,832. The population decreased 21.9% from 10,516 at the 2000 census. The majority of residents reside in the larger Boynton neighborhood, as entire blocks of Oakwood Heights have been cleared out to make room for potential industrial expansion.

Located in the heavily industrialized southwestern area of Detroit, the two neighborhoods occupy the entirety of the 48217 ZIP Code. (Note: The uninhabited Fordson Island, which is part of the city of Dearborn, also uses the 48217 ZIP Code.) Boynton and Oakwood Heights are densely populated yet highly polluted by major industrial development. The neighborhoods are consistently ranked as the most polluted ZIP Code in Michigan.

== Geography ==
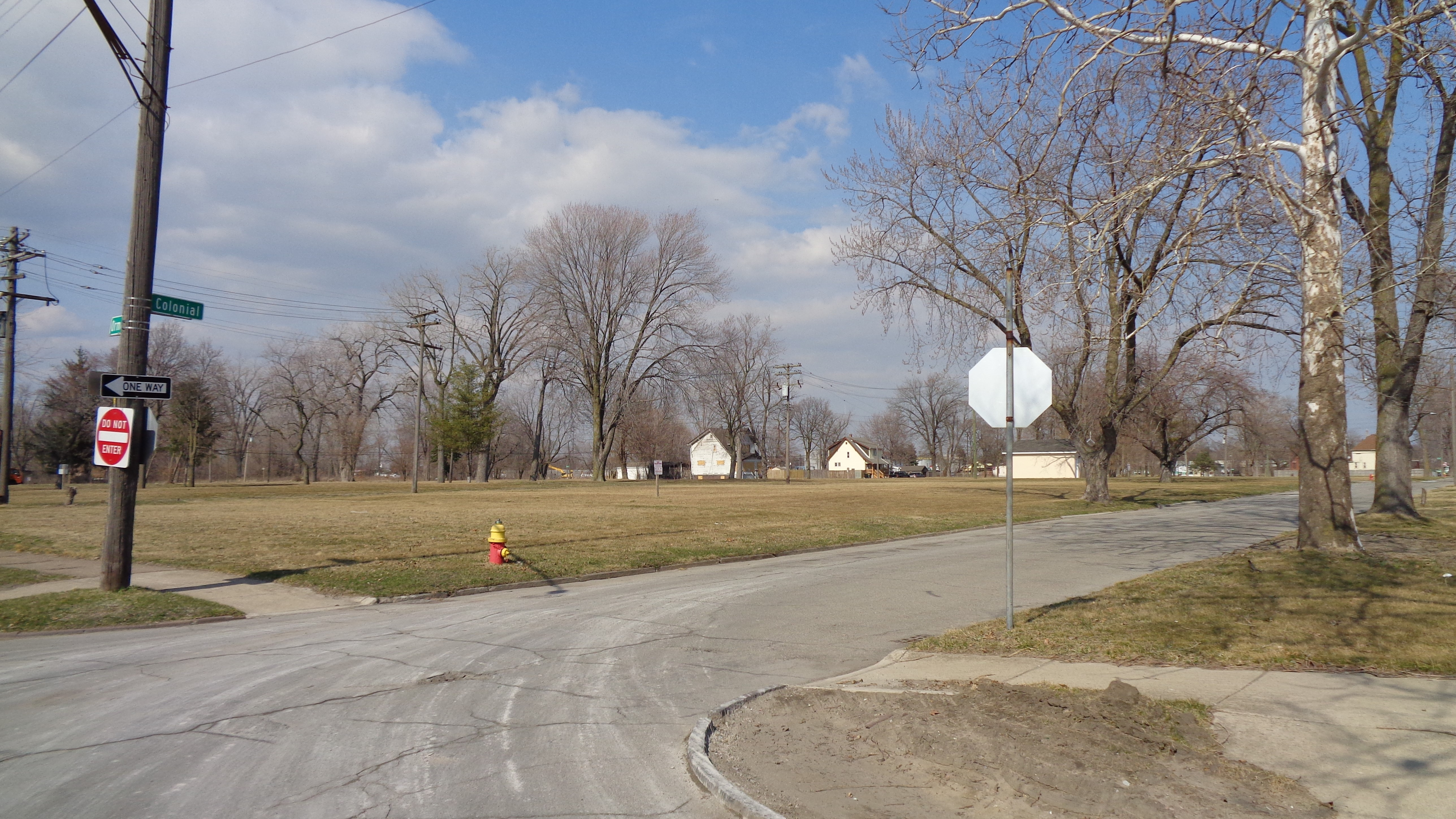
Large areas of Oakwood Heights have been bought out and demolished by the Marathon Petroleum Company.

Boynton and Oakwood Heights occupy the southernmost 2.80 square miles (7.25 km^{2}) of the city of Detroit. It is the only area of the Detroit city limits that fall south of the River Rouge. Boynton is the southernmost neighborhood, stretching as far south as Outer Drive on the border with the city of Lincoln Park. The city of Melvindale is to the west, and the cities of Ecorse and River Rouge lie to the east. Interstate 75 (I-75) bisects the two neighborhoods north–south. Oakwood Heights is the smaller of the two neighborhoods and borders Melvindale to the south and the city of Dearborn to the northwest.

The two neighborhoods are connected to the rest of the city of Detroit by two bridges across Interstate 75 and Fort Street (formerly known as U.S. Route 25) connecting to the neighborhood of Carbon Works, which lead to the neighborhoods of Springwells and Delray. Dix Avenue also crosses the river to connect Oakwood Heights to Dearborn. Oakwood Heights also connects to Fordson Island in the River Rouge via Riverside Drive. Fordson Island is part of the city of Dearborn and has no public access or residents.

Despite the heavy industrialization, several parks exist within the area. Kemeny Park, located along Fort Street in between I-75, is the largest recreation facility. The park opened in 1957 and was named after local resident Charles Kemeny, who died in combat in World War II. The park closed in 2015 but was reopened in 2018 after a $9.5 million renovation—$2 million of which was donated by the nearby Marathon Petroleum Corporation.

== Demographics ==
According to data from the 2010 census, the areas of Boynton–Oakwood Heights had 8,832 residents and 3,126 occupied households for an average density of 3,154.3/sq mi (1,217.9/km^{2}). There were 716 vacant units.

According to 2009 estimates, the racial makeup of the two neighborhoods was 10.38% White, 74.80% African American, 0.67% Native American, 0.46% Asian, 0.10% Pacific Islander, 0.01% from other races, and 2.60% from two or more races. Hispanic or Latino of any race were 10.94% of the population. 2009 estimates were off significantly from official counts later recorded at the 2010 census. While there was estimated to be 12,129 residents in 2009, the census officially accounted for only 8,832. The majority of the population lives in Boynton.

The median income for a household in these neighborhoods was $26,316, and the median income for a family was $28,789. About 27.3% of the population was below the poverty line.

== Transportation ==
Interstate 75, known locally as the Fisher Freeway, runs north–south through the Boynton and Oakwood Heights neighborhoods and has two exits: Outer Drive (#42) and Schaefer Highway (#43). Outer Drive represents the southernmost border of the Boynton neighborhood and the southernmost city limit of Detroit with Lincoln Park. The Schaefer Highway (also referred to as Coolidge Highway at various points along its route) runs northwest through the neighborhoods, beginning just east in the city of River Rouge and running north all the way to the city of Rochester Hills. Fort Street (formerly U.S. Route 25) runs north–south through the middle of the neighborhoods, passes under Interstate 75, and crosses the River Rouge leading into Downtown Detroit. Several Norfolk Southern Railway lines runs through the Oakwood Heights section.

The Detroit Department of Transportation operates three bus routes through Boynton and Oakwood Heights. Route #41 travels along Schaefer Highway from the city of River Rouge at Jefferson Avenue, through parts of Dearborn, and to the northern limits of Detroit at 8 Mile Road at the city of Oak Park. Route #19 travels from Outer Drive along Fort Street to Downtown Detroit. Route #89 is a part-time route that runs along Bassett Street from Outer Drive along the border with the city of River Rouge, turns on Schaefer Highway, enters the Fisher Freeway, crosses the river, and meanders into the New Center district.

Oakwood Heights has one property listed on the National Register of Historic Places: the Fort Street–Pleasant Street and Norfolk & Western Railroad Viaduct, which was constructed in 1928. The 2,800-foot-long (850 m) bridge carries six lanes of Fort Street over Pleasant Street and four Norfolk Southern Railway lines before crossing the River Rouge.

== Education ==
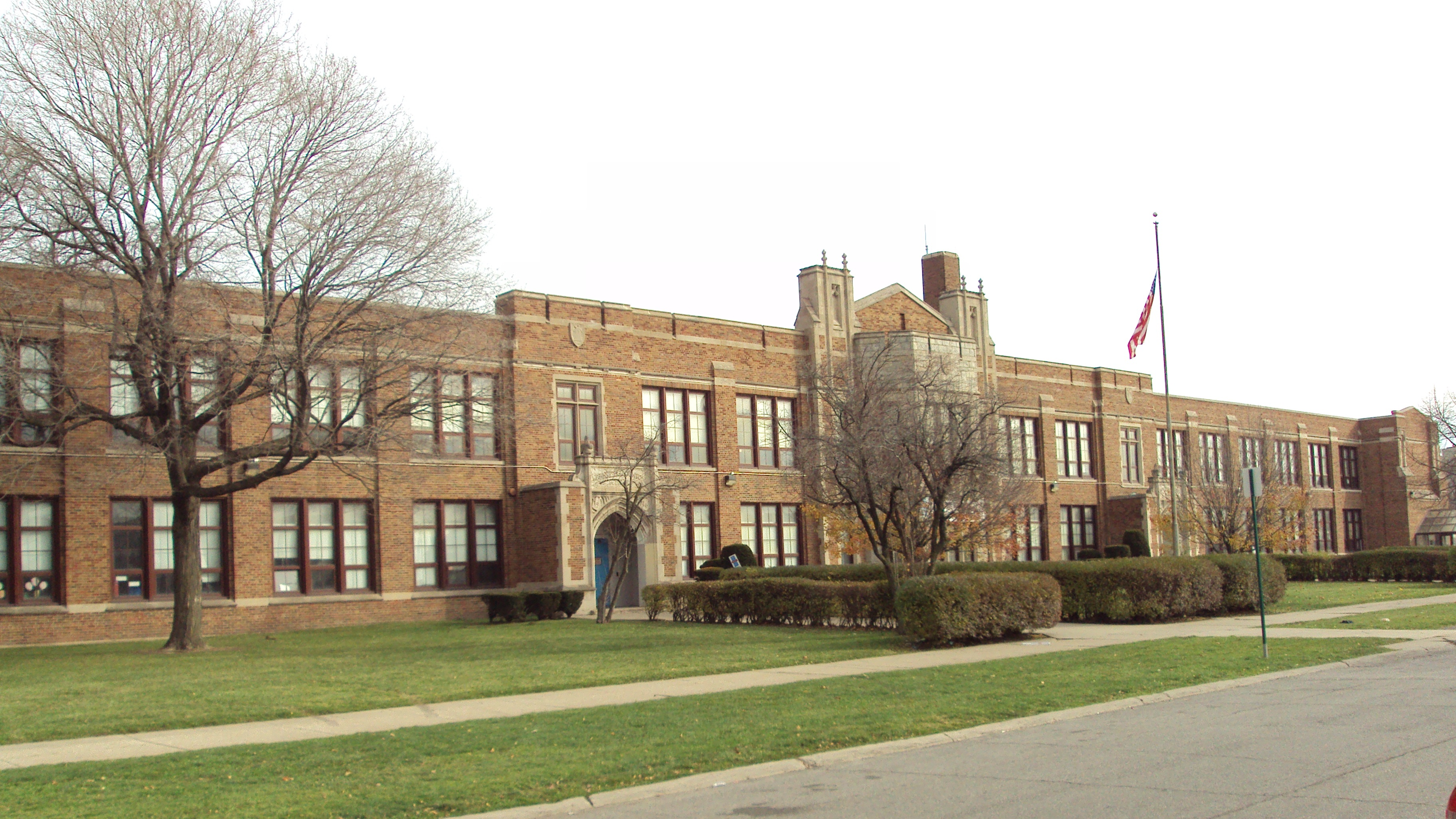
Mark Twain School for Scholars serves grades Pre-K to 8th grade.

Being part of Detroit, residents of Boynton and Oakwood Heights are automatically zoned to Detroit Public Schools Community District. Students are currently zoned to Mark Twain School for Scholars for elementary and middle school through eighth grade. High school students are zoned to Western International High School. High school students were previously zoned to Southwestern High School until that school closed in 2012.

Located at 12800 Visger Street, Mark Twain School for Scholars (sometimes referred to as Mark Twain Elementary–Middle School) is the only public school located within the Boynton–Oakwood Heights neighborhoods. The school was originally known as the Frances G. Boynton School. It was built in 1926. The school served 220 students for the 2017–18 school year—down 23 students (9.5%) from the previous school year. Of the 220 students, there were 199 (90.5%) African Americans, 17 (7.7%) Hispanics, and four (1.8%) Caucasians.

The only other school located within these neighborhoods was the Pierre Toussaint Academy, which was a charter school located at 2450 South Beatrice Street in Boynton. Managed by The Leona Group, the academy opened for the 1998–99 school year and enrolled around 400 students at one time before closing due to academic viability at the end of the 2011–12 school year on June 30, 2012.

While the two neighborhoods contain no public libraries, the nearest Detroit Public Library is the Campbell Branch at 8733 West Vernor Highway just north in the Springwells neighborhood. Also, the Lincoln Park Public Library is about one mile south of Boynton at 1381 Southfield Road in Lincoln Park.

== Industry ==
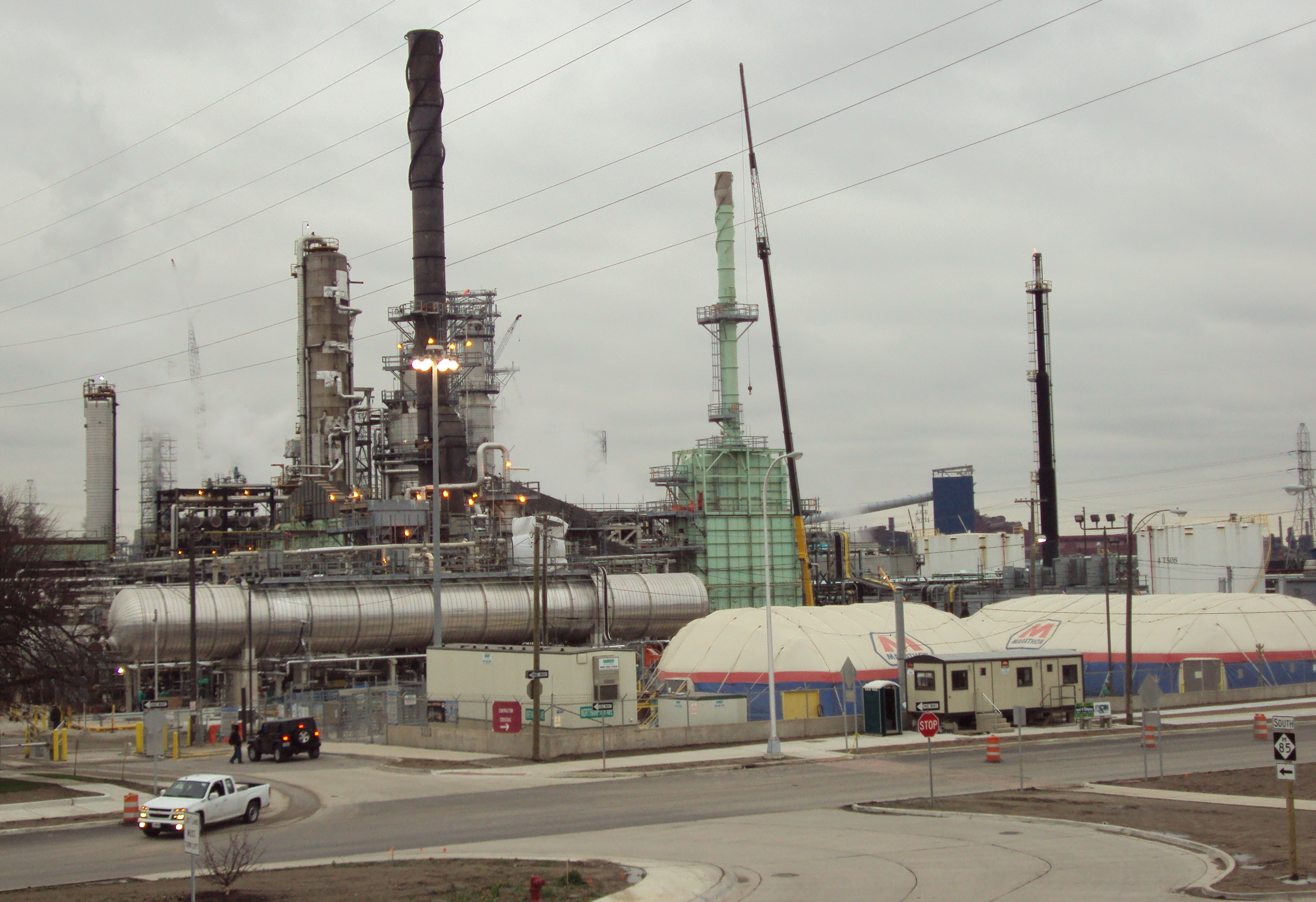
The Marathon Petroleum Company LP is the largest facility within the Oakwood Heights neighborhood.

Southwest Detroit contains heavy industrial development, and this has reportedly raised health concerns for some residents living in Boynton and Oakwood Heights. In February 2019, the Detroit Metro Times reported that the remaining 7,000 residents in the neighborhoods have a higher rate of asthma and cancer than most of the country. While at least 14 states regulate and prohibit how close industries can build to schools and residential zones, Michigan does not have such regulations. Long ago, the city zoned its southwest area for heavy industrial use despite preexisting residential communities. Air pollution in Boynton and Oakwood Heights has reportedly led to respiratory diseases and cancer cases in long-term residents. In an article published by the Detroit Free Press in June 2010, they reported, "For the past six months, a rain of mysterious sparkly dust of unknown origin has landed on their homes and gardens. Odd odors and clouds of dark particles float overhead." This dust pollution has been shown to contain high levels of harmful metals, such as lead, that can be harmful to the health of long-term residents. Even the soil may be unsuitable for growing gardens.

The Detroit Free Press stated that the 48217 ZIP Code—occupied solely by Boynton and Oakwood Heights—is "Michigan's most polluted [ZIP Code], according to analysis by environmental scientists from the University of Michigan." Halting the growing industries could discourage job growth, and the state continues to issue permits for heavy industries. Industries comply with both state and federal regulations. However, the number of industries proximate to the neighborhoods has a cumulative effect. Heavy traffic and railroads have also increased air pollution, as do numerous other large industries outside of the neighborhoods. Among these industries, the Detroit Wastewater Treatment Plant on the other side of the river and the U.S. Steel facility on Zug Island in the city of River Rouge further add to the poor air quality in the area.

=== Marathon Petroleum Corporation ===
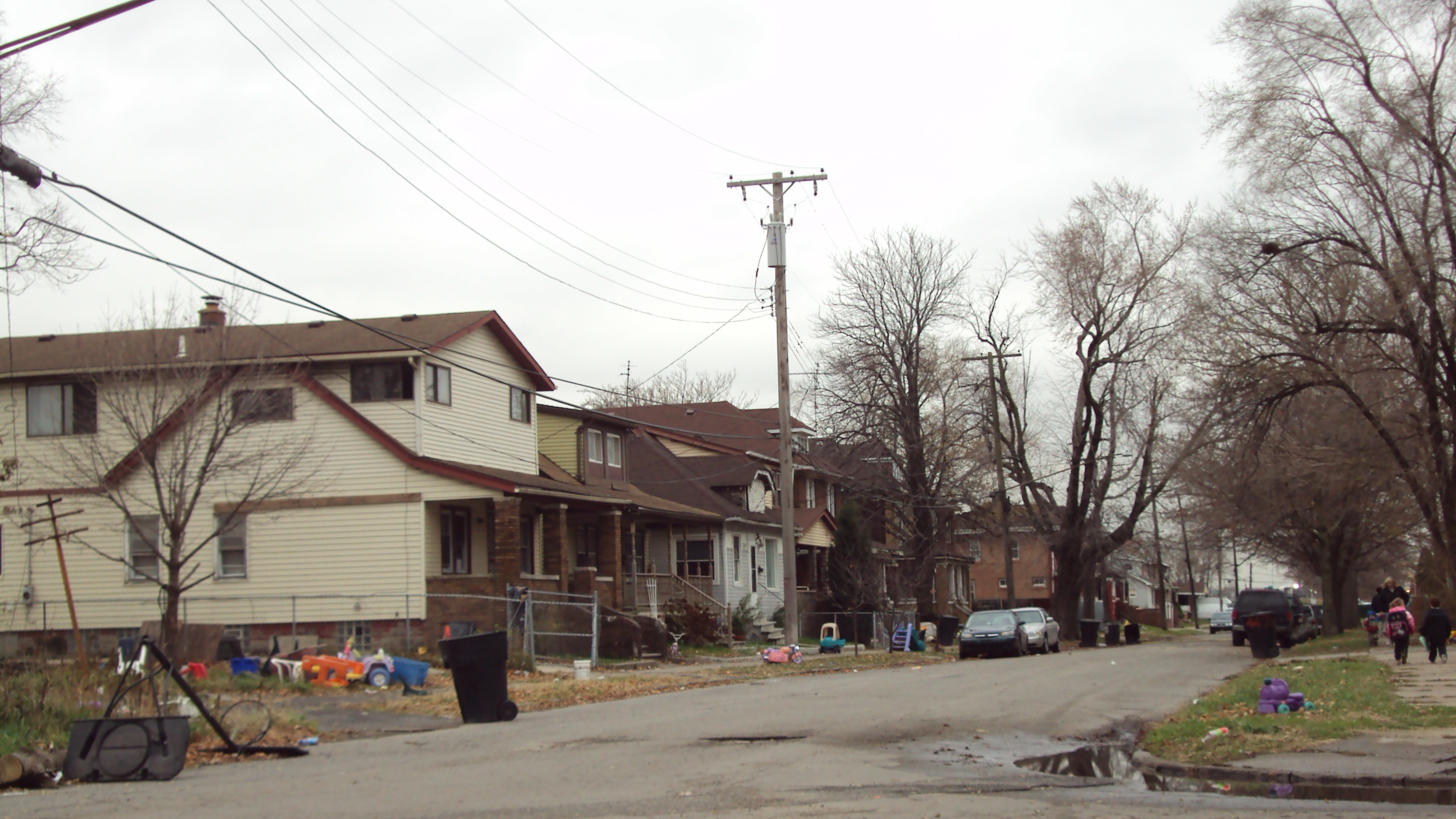
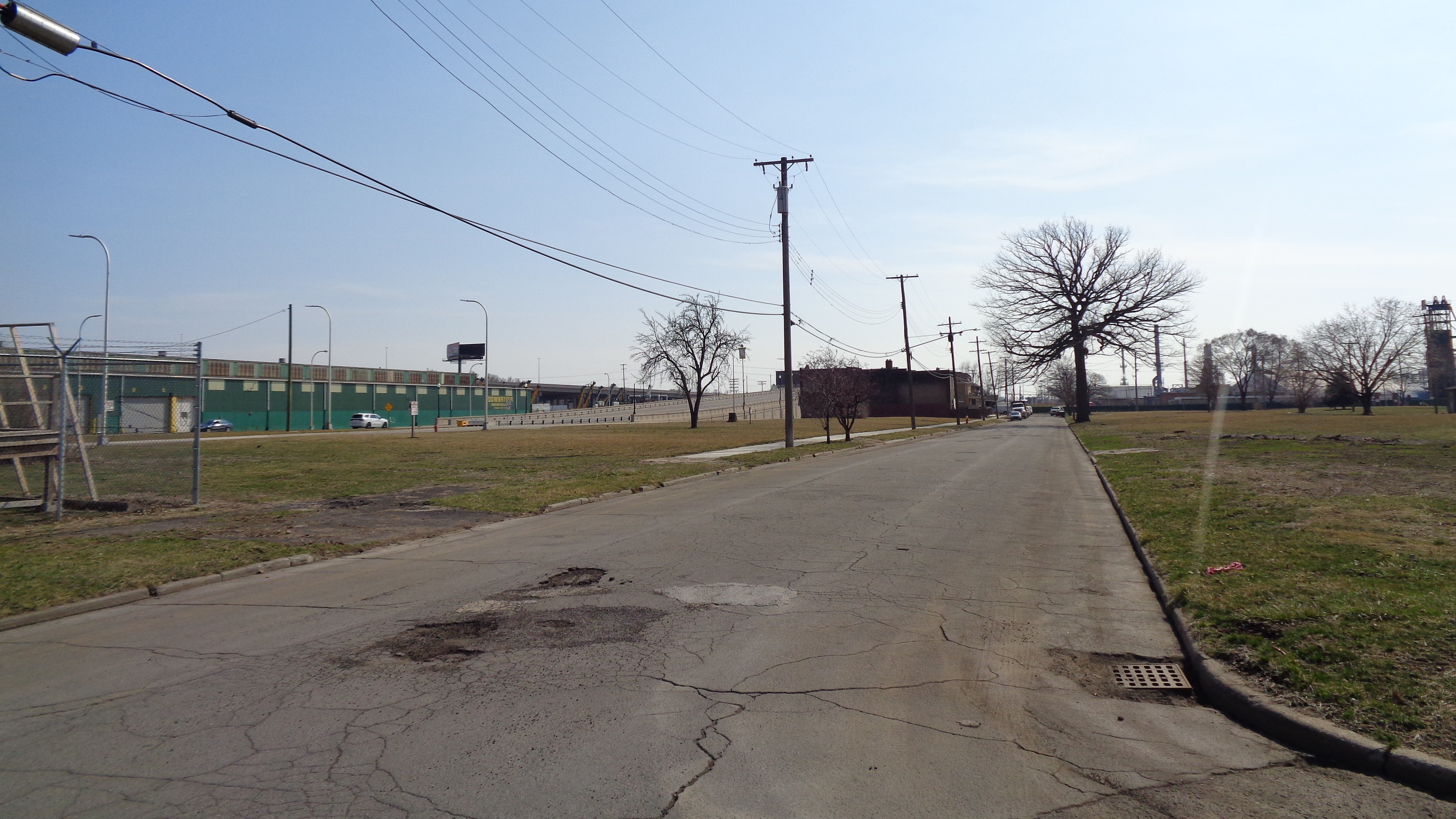
South Waring Street in Oakwood Heights in 2011 (top) and in 2019 (bottom) after many homes were demolished

The largest of these industries is the Marathon Petroleum Company LP refinery located at 301 South Fort Street in Oakwood Heights. The facility was originally built in 1930 by the Aurora Gasoline Company. Today, the expanded facility is the only petroleum refinery in Michigan, and it has a capacity of 140,000 barrels per day and around 540 employees. The refinery received the Energy Star Award in 2007 and 2008 from the Environmental Protection Agency for reducing energy usage and protecting the environment through energy efficiency. The refinery has added green space around its facility, although it is still viewed negatively by the surrounding communities.

The Michigan Department of Environmental Quality has issued 13 violations to the facility since 2013 and at least three fines, especially after a massive cloud of burned petroleum coke blanketed the area and blew into neighboring Windsor on July 27, 2013. In February 2019, a malfunctioning flare from the facility released "horrific, stomach churning odors" that forced some residents to stay indoors. In response to the growing criticism, Jamal T. Kheiry, communications manager for Marathon, wrote, "Over the past 20 years, we have reduced our emissions more than 75 percent, and the refinery comprises only three percent of the emissions in this heavily industrialized area of Southwest Detroit."

The refinery has received permission for an expansion of its facilities and has sought to buy out properties in the Oakwood Heights community. It remains unclear if Marathon would actually expand into the area or if they are just buying out nearby properties to create a larger buffer from the remaining communities in order to avoid further complaints. The neighborhood of Oakwood Heights once contained about 500 homes, but large areas and entire blocks have been bought out and demolished. Many local residents welcomed the buyout as a means to leave the area. Marathon offered 350 homeowners buyout packages totaling nearly $60,000 per home in the Oakwood Heights community, even though some homes were valued at much less. A similar offer was requested but not granted to the Boynton community, which has few major industries itself and is mostly separated from the facility by Interstate 75 and Fort Street. Not all residents have accepted Marathon's offer, as the company cannot force residents to move out. Those residents that have stayed are growing concerned that the empty space and general neglect of the neighborhood will increase crime. Feeling Oakwood Heights has become abandoned, some have complained that local police have become unresponsive to their calls.
