= HopCat =

American restaurant and bar chain

- Type: Private
- Industry: Restaurant
- Genre: Beer Bar & Restaurant
- Founded: 2008
- Founder: Mark Sellers
- Headquarters: Grand Rapids, Michigan
- Number of locations: 13 (2026)
- Parent: Project BarFly, LLC
- Website: hopcat.com

HopCat is a restaurant and bar chain based in Grand Rapids, Michigan, United States, with twelve locations in three states. HopCat is best known for having a variety of beers on tap, with several of their locations offering over 100 different options.

Founded in 2008 in Grand Rapids by Mark Sellers, the original HopCat in Grand Rapids is a brewpub with its own small brewery. As of 2026, 13 locations have been built.

== History ==
HopCat was founded in 2008 by Mark Sellers. Five years later in 2013, it opened its second location in East Lansing, Michigan.

In 2015, BarFly Ventures secured $25 million in capital financing to expand HopCat to several additional locations.

On June 6, 2020, BarFly Ventures filed for Chapter 11 bankruptcy protection in Grand Rapids.

BarFly Ventures’ HopCat bought out of bankruptcy by Congruent Investment Partners and Main Street Capital and changed names to Project BarFly, LLC.

In October, 2025, Project BarFly, LLC was acquired by Uncommon Equity based out of Chicago.

== Reception ==
The Grand Rapids location was recognized as one of the best brewpubs in the United States by RateBeer.com from 2013 to 2015. In 2010, HopCat was rated No. 3 on BeerAdvocate's list of "Best Beer Bars on Planet Earth."

== Cultural Impact ==
On December 8, 2024, HopCat Detroit hosted the a look-alike contest for American football coach Dan Campbell coinciding with the Detroit Lions’ football season.

In a press conference, Campbell responded to the fliers, stating that "I don't know why you'd waste your time with that," and that he would consider competing if there was a "legitimate prize". He did not appear at the contest.

Four randomly selected judges scored the contestants from 1 to 10 in four categories: resemblance, style, energy and creativity. The five contestants who reached the final were then asked questions by the judges. It was won by 55-year-old machinist Jeff Randall, who received free Cosmik Fries at the restaurant for a year as well as a golden game ball.

== Controversy ==
On December 15, 2018, Barfly Ventures CEO Mark Gray announced that Hopcat would be renaming their “Crack Fries” in order to avoid making light of crack cocaine addiction. The fries were renamed "Cosmik Fries" in reference to Frank Zappa's song "Cosmik Debris".

== Locations ==
=== Current locations ===
- Ann Arbor, Michigan - Downtown
- Detroit, Michigan - Midtown
- East Lansing, Michigan
- Grand Rapids, Michigan (original location, opened in 2008) - Heartside
- Grand Rapids, Michigan - Knapp's Corner
- Holland, Michigan
- Kalamazoo, Michigan - Downtown
- Lincoln, Nebraska - West Haymarket
- Livonia, Michigan
- Royal Oak, Michigan - Main St
- Clinton Township, Michigan - Partridge Creek
- Southgate, Michigan
- Auburn Hills, Michigan - Great Lakes Crossing Outlets

=== Former locations ===
- Chicago, Illinois - Lincoln Park
- Kansas City, Missouri - Westport
- Lexington, Kentucky
- Louisville, Kentucky - Bardstown Road
- Madison, Wisconsin - Capitol
- Minneapolis, Minnesota - Downtown
- Port St. Lucie, Florida - Tradition
- Royal Oak, Michigan - W. 5th St
- St. Louis, Missouri - Delmar Loop
- Indianapolis, Indiana - Broad Ripple
