= Ashley Qualls =

American entrepreneur

Ashley Qualls (born June 4, 1990) is an entrepreneur from Detroit, Michigan. Originally as a hobby, at age 14, she started a website called whateverlife.com, designed to provide free Myspace layouts and HTML tutorials for people in her age demographic, and supported entirely by advertising revenue. She used the basement of her home as her office, employing her mother and friends from school and made $70,000 in the first months. She had earned over a million dollars by age 17.

Qualls turned down numerous offers to acquire her company including an offer for $1.5 million and her choice of any car. In September 2006 she paid cash for a $250,000 home in a fenced-off subdivision in the community of Southgate, Michigan. At the age of 17, she obtained legal emancipation, giving her the same legal status as an adult.

In 2007 her website had over seven million unique visitors a month and generated over a million dollars in ad revenue.

In 2016, Qualls founded SickNotDead.com, providing resources for the chronically ill. She is the editor-in-chief of Lucky Soul; which helps to fund charitable causes.
