= Ecorse Township, Michigan =

- Former civil township
- Former location within the state of Michigan Former location within the United States
- Coordinates: 42°15′N 83°10′W
- Country: United States
- State: Michigan
- County: Wayne
- Organized: 1827
- Disestablished: 1958
- Time zone: UTC-5 (Eastern (EST))
  - Summer (DST): UTC-4 (EDT)

Ecorse Township is a defunct civil township in Wayne County in the U.S. state of Michigan.

== Description ==
The township consisted of 54 mi^{2} (140 km^{2}), which included two small islands in the Detroit River. It was bordered to the north by Springwells Township with the boundary being the River Rouge. To the west it was bordered by Dearborn and Taylor Townships, with the primary boundary being Pelham Road. To the south it was bordered by Monguagon Township, and a small part of Brownstown Township, with the primary boundary being Pennsylvania Road. Finally, to the east, it was bordered by the Detroit River.

Organized in 1827, the entire township has since been incorporated, and includes the cities of Melvindale, Allen Park, Lincoln Park, River Rouge, Ecorse, Southgate, Wyandotte, and the Boynton and Oakwood Heights neighborhoods of Detroit.

== History ==
Although French explorers, missionaries, and traders frequented the area, the first existing record of a white settler owning land dates to 1776, when the Pottawatomi ceded a large tract of land to Pierre St. Cosme. One boundary of the ceded land came to be known as "St. Cosme Line" and later became part of the route of Southfield Road. In the late 18th century, many land grants in the area were awarded by the French crown.

The first known permanent settler in what would become Ecorse Township was Pierre Michel Campau, who arrived in 1795. He settle in Southgate, which subsequently became a farming community. Other people from the Detroit area at the Rouge and Detroit Rivers followed him to Southgate. Some records indicate settlers near the mouth of the Ecorse River as early as 1764.

The township was established on April 12, 1827 along with eight other townships by the Michigan Territorial Legislature in a major reorganization of Wayne County.
