= Southgate, Michigan =

- City
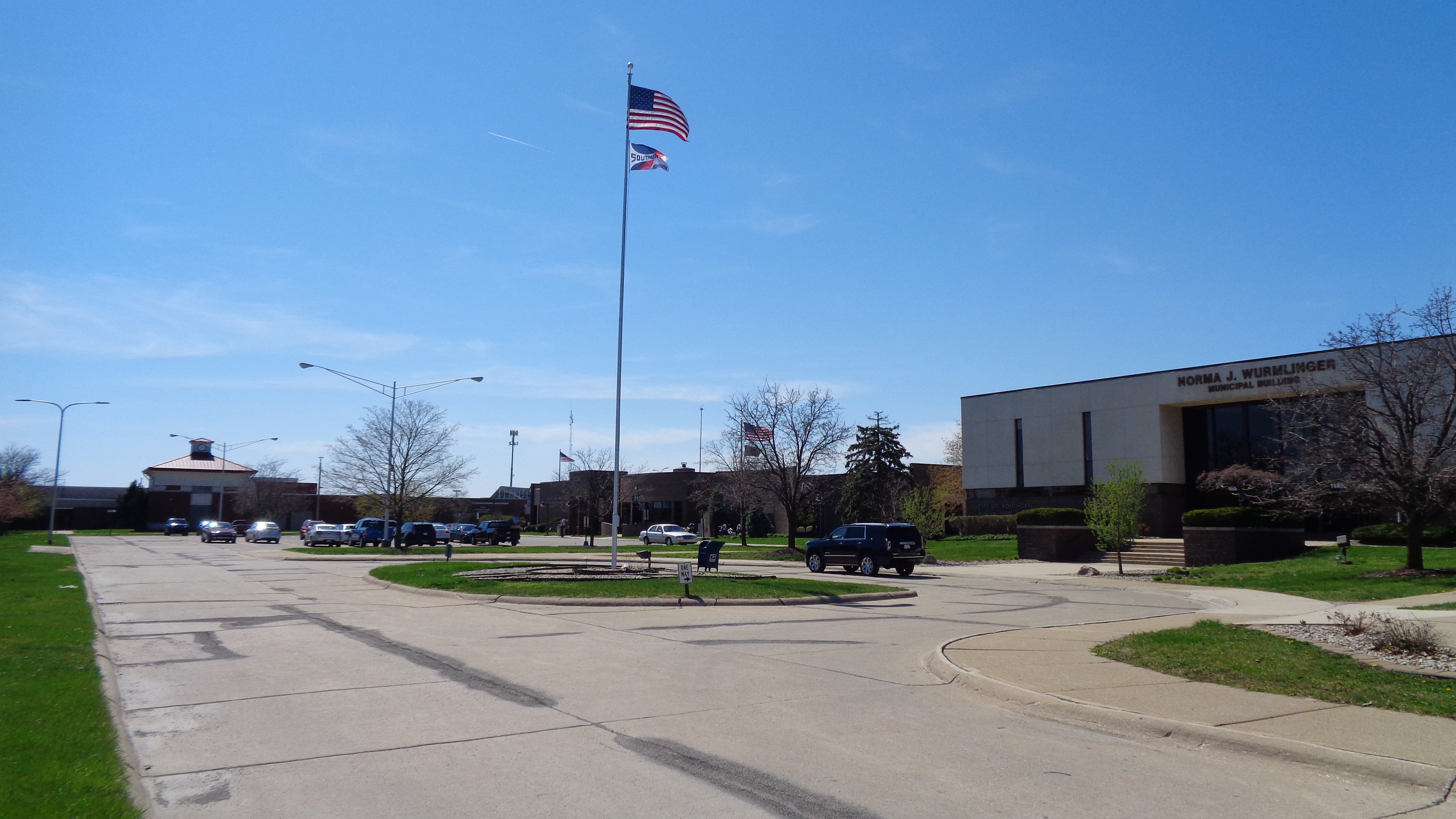
- Southgate Municipal Complex

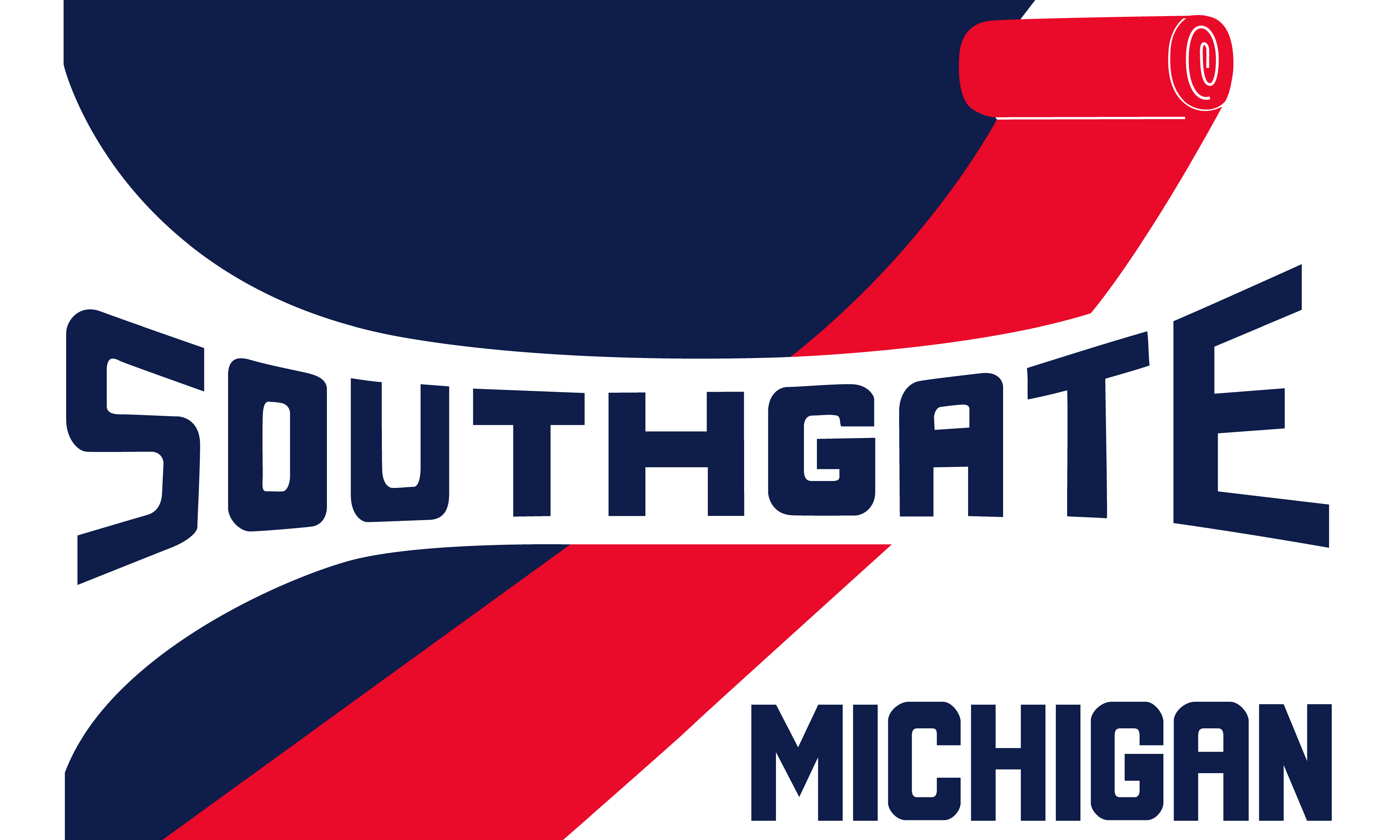
- Flag Seal Logo
- Nickname: "The Dining Capital of Downriver"
- Motto: "The Heart of Downriver"
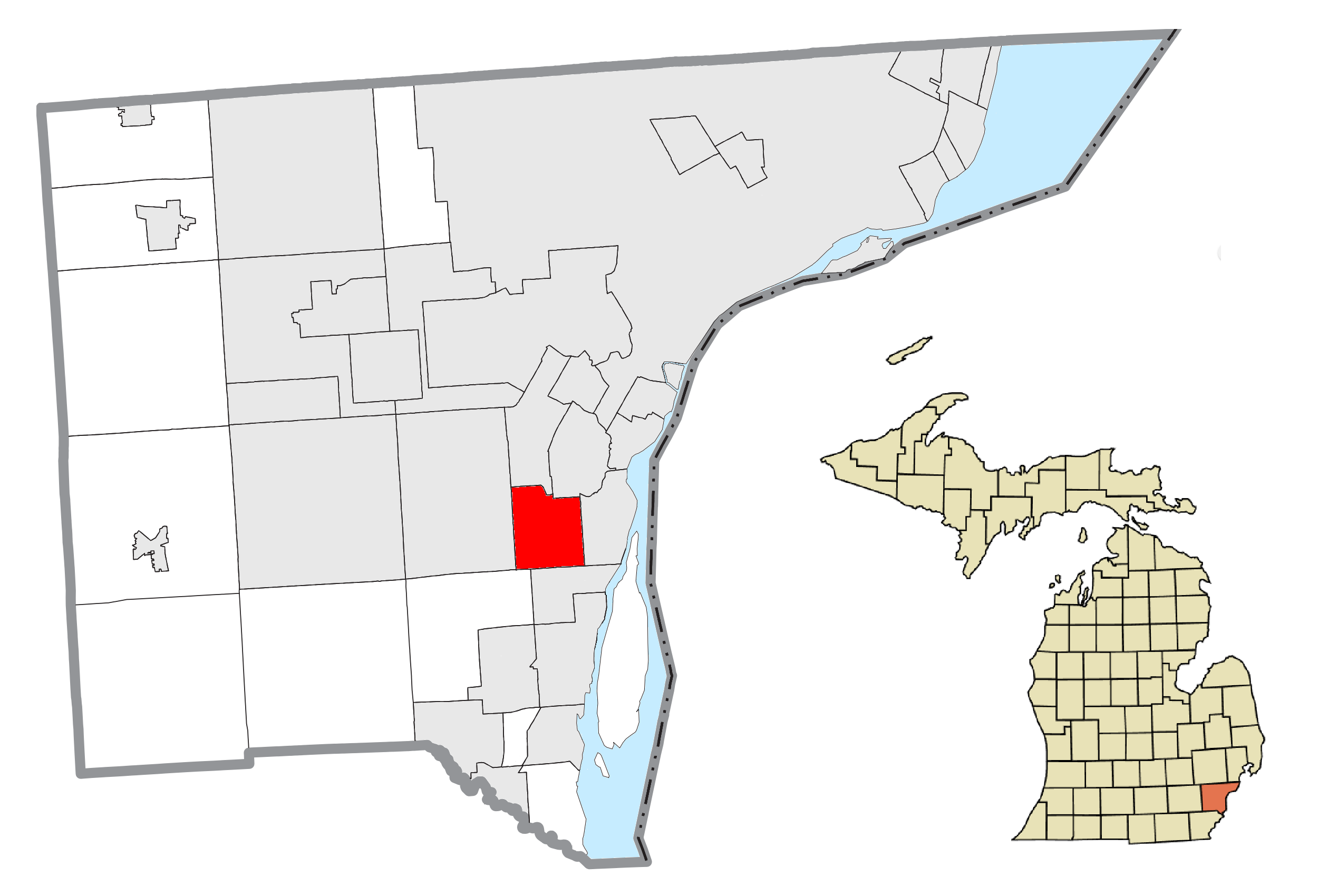
- Location of Southgate in Wayne County, Michigan
- Coordinates: 42°12′50″N 83°11′38″W
- Country: United States
- State: Michigan
- County: Wayne
- Settled: 1795
- Incorporated: October 8, 1958

Government
  - Type: Mayor–council
  - Mayor: Joseph Kuspa
  - Clerk: Janice Ferencz
  - Administrator: Dan Marsh
  - Councilmembers: Zoey Kuspa; Christian Graziani; Karen George; Phillip Rauch; Priscilla Ayres-Reiss; Ed Gawlik Jr. Adriene Price

Area
  - City: 6.875 sq mi (17.805 km^{2})
  - Land: 6.875 sq mi (17.805 km^{2})
  - Water: 0 sq mi (0.000 km^{2})
- Elevation: 590 ft (180 m)

Population (2020)
  - City: 30,014
  - Estimate (2023): 29,002
  - Rank: MI: 38th
  - Density: 4,220/sq mi (1,629/km^{2})
  - Urban: 3,776,890 (US: 12nd)
  - Metro: 4,342,304 (US: 14th)
- Time zone: UTC−5 (Eastern (EST))
  - Summer (DST): UTC−4 (EDT)
- ZIP Code: 48195
- Area code: 734
- FIPS code: 26-74960
- GNIS feature ID: 638446
- Sales tax: 6.0%
- Website: southgatemi.org

Southgate is a city in Wayne County in the U.S. state of Michigan. A Downriver suburb of Detroit, Southgate is located roughly 14 miles (22.5 km) southwest of downtown Detroit. As of the 2020 census, Southgate had a population of 30,047.

Southgate was incorporated as a city on October 8, 1958, from one of the last remaining portions of the now-defunct Ecorse Township.

== History ==
Pierre Michel Campau was the first white settler in Southgate. He moved into the area in 1795, which subsequently became a farming community. Other people from the Detroit area at the Rouge and Detroit Rivers followed him to Southgate.

Historically a rural area of Ecorse Township, the areas within present-day Southgate were originally platted with street grids beginning in the 1920s - though most developments only started just after World War II. Among the oldest residential areas in the city is the Old Homestead neighborhood, on the east side.

There are two accounts of the city's name: Southgate is described in local guides as the "South Gate" or entrance to the Metro Detroit area. "A metropolitan daily picture story" in late 1956 also explained this.

Southgate's first mayor, Thomas J. Anderson, also stated in 1956 that the name originated from the newly built Southgate Shopping Center at the southeast corner of Eureka & Trenton roads. "We were trying to get a separate post office for our community, and were advised that it would help our cause if the township board passed a resolution creating an unincorporated village," Anderson explained. "The name Southgate was chosen because of the shopping center then under consideration, and the board agreed that it was an appropriate name. Anderson had previously suggested the city be named Southgate due to its location south of Detroit. Anderson became aware of South Gate, California near Los Angeles during World War II while temporarily stationed in San Diego. The resolution was adopted at a regular meeting in the early summer of 1953."

Thomas Anderson became the first mayor in 1958 after being Ecorse Township's supervisor for the previous five years. Southgate Anderson High School was named after him in 1982. The flag for Southgate Michigan which was created in 1973.

== Geography ==
According to the United States Census Bureau, the city has a total area of 6.875 sq mi (17.81 km^{2}), all land.

Southgate borders the cities of Riverview (south), Wyandotte (east), Allen Park (northwest), Taylor (west), and Lincoln Park (north), as well as Brownstown Charter Township (southwest).

== Demographics ==
Historical population
Census	Pop.	Note	%±
1960	29,404		—
1970	33,909		15.3%
1980	32,058		−5.5%
1990	30,771		−4.0%
2000	30,136		−2.1%
2010	30,047		−0.3%
2020	30,014		−0.1%
2023 (est.)	29,002		−3.4%
U.S. Decennial Census; 2020 Census

=== Racial and ethnic composition ===
Southgate city, Michigan – Racial and ethnic composition Note: the US Census treats Hispanic/Latino as an ethnic category. This table excludes Latinos from the racial categories and assigns them to a separate category. Hispanics/Latinos may be of any race.
Race / Ethnicity (NH = Non-Hispanic)	Pop 2000	Pop 2010	Pop 2020	% 2000	% 2010	% 2020
White alone (NH)	27,382	25,389	22,544	90.86%	84.50%	75.11%
Black or African American alone (NH)	624	1,635	2,283	2.07%	5.44%	7.61%
Native American or Alaska Native alone (NH)	131	116	109	0.43%	0.39%	0.36%
Asian alone (NH)	501	488	759	1.66%	1.62%	2.53%
Native Hawaiian or Pacific Islander alone (NH)	9	5	6	0.03%	0.02%	0.02%
Other race alone (NH)	8	21	122	0.03%	0.07%	0.41%
Mixed race or Multiracial (NH)	283	437	1,448	0.94%	1.45%	4.82%
Hispanic or Latino (any race)	1,198	1,956	2,743	3.98%	6.51%	9.14%
Total	30,136	30,047	30,014	100.00%	100.00%	100.00%

=== 2020 census ===
As of the 2020 census, there were 30,014 people, 13,497 households, and 7,784 families residing in the city. The population density was 4,365.7/sq mi (1,685.6/km^{2}). There were 14,053 housing units.

The median age was 42.4 years. 17.7% of residents were under the age of 18, 5.4% were under 5 years of age, and 20.1% were 65 years of age or older. For every 100 females there were 93.9 males, and for every 100 females age 18 and over there were 92.5 males age 18 and over.

100.0% of residents lived in urban areas, while 0.0% lived in rural areas.

There were 13,497 households in Southgate, of which 23.3% had children under the age of 18 living in them. Of all households, 38.8% were married-couple households, 22.3% were households with a male householder and no spouse or partner present, and 31.3% were households with a female householder and no spouse or partner present. About 35.7% of all households were made up of individuals and 15.8% had someone living alone who was 65 years of age or older.

There were 14,053 housing units, of which 4.0% were vacant. The homeowner vacancy rate was 1.0% and the rental vacancy rate was 5.4%.

Racial composition as of the 2020 census
Race	Number	Percent
White	23,381	77.9%
Black or African American	2,338	7.8%
American Indian and Alaska Native	202	0.7%
Asian	764	2.5%
Native Hawaiian and Other Pacific Islander	9	0.0%
Some other race	753	2.5%
Two or more races	2,567	8.6%

=== 2010 census ===
As of the 2010 census, there were 30,047 people, 13,062 households, and 7,833 families residing in the city. The population density was 4,389.0/sq mi (1,694.6/km^{2}). There were 13,933 housing units at an average density of 2,034.0/sq mi (785.3/km^{2}). The racial makeup of the city was 88.7% White, 5.5% African American, 0.5% Native American, 1.6% Asian, 1.7% from other races, and 2.0% from two or more races. Hispanic or Latino of any race were 6.5% of the population.

There were 13,062 households, of which 27.4% had children under the age of 18 living with them, 42.6% were married couples living together, 12.3% had a female householder with no husband present, 5.0% had a male householder with no wife present, and 40.0% were non-families. 33.9% of all households were made up of individuals, and 14.1% had someone living alone who was 65 years of age or older. The average household size was 2.29 and the average family size was 2.95.

The median age in the city was 40.8 years. 20.3% of residents were under the age of 18; 9.1% were between the ages of 18 and 24; 26.2% were from 25 to 44; 28.2% were from 45 to 64; and 16.3% were 65 years of age or older. The gender makeup of the city was 47.9% male and 52.3% female.

=== 2000 census ===
As of the 2000 census, there were 30,136 people, 12,836 households, and 8,048 families residing in the city. The population density was 4,395.8/sq mi (1,697.2/km^{2}). There were 13,361 housing units at an average density of 1,948.9/sq mi (752.5/km^{2}). The racial makeup of the city was 93.67% White, 2.11% African American, 0.50% Native American, 1.67% Asian, 0.04% Pacific Islander, 0.85% from other races, and 1.18% from two or more races. Hispanic or Latino of any race were 3.98% of the population.

There were 12,836 households, out of which 26.7% had children under the age of 18 living with them, 49.2% were married couples living together, 9.7% had a female householder with no husband present, and 37.3% were non-families. 32.3% of all households were made up of individuals, and 14.1% had someone living alone who was 65 years of age or older. The average household size was 2.33 and the average family size was 2.98.

In the city, the population was spread out, with 21.5% under the age of 18, 8.3% from 18 to 24, 30.6% from 25 to 44, 23.3% from 45 to 64, and 16.2% who were 65 years of age or older. The median age was 38 years. For every 100 females, there were 93.0 males.

The median income for a household in the city was $46,927, and the median income for a family was $56,710. Males had a median income of $45,829 versus $28,549 for females. The per capita income for the city was $23,219. About 2.6% of families and 4.6% of the population were below the poverty line, including 3.4% of those under age 18 and 8.5% of those age 65 or over.

== Economy ==
Southgate Shopping Center opened in 1957.

== Parks and recreation ==
=== Southgate Nature Center ===
The Southgate Nature Center is a public nature preserve connected to Southgate Anderson High School originally created to teach students about nature preservation. This 30 acre park includes ponds, a fishing dock, forests, fields, and walking trails.

=== Southgate Civic Center ===
The Southgate Civic Center (A.K.A the Southgate Arena), includes two ice rinks and rooms available to rent. During the off season, dry floor events can be booked. The Civic Center also hosts the Southgate Figure Skating Team. The address is 14700 Reaume Parkway.

== Education ==
=== Primary and secondary schools ===
==== Public schools ====
Southgate Community School District operates the following public schools:

- Anderson High School
- Davidson Middle School
- Allen Elementary
- Fordline Elementary
- Grogan Elementary
- North Pointe IB Elementary
- Shelters Elementary

==== Private schools ====
- Christ the King Lutheran
- St. Pius X - opened September 1950
- Creative Montessori Academy

== Media ==
Southgate currently houses the headquarters of The News-Herald, a local Downriver newspaper which covers over twenty surrounding communities. During the late 1950s and 1960s, The Southgate Sentinel, a Mellus newspaper and forerunner to the present-day News-Herald, was published. Southgate is also served by regional newspapers The Downriver Sunday Times, Detroit Free Press and The Detroit News, as well as by Detroit's radio and television outlets.

== Infrastructure ==
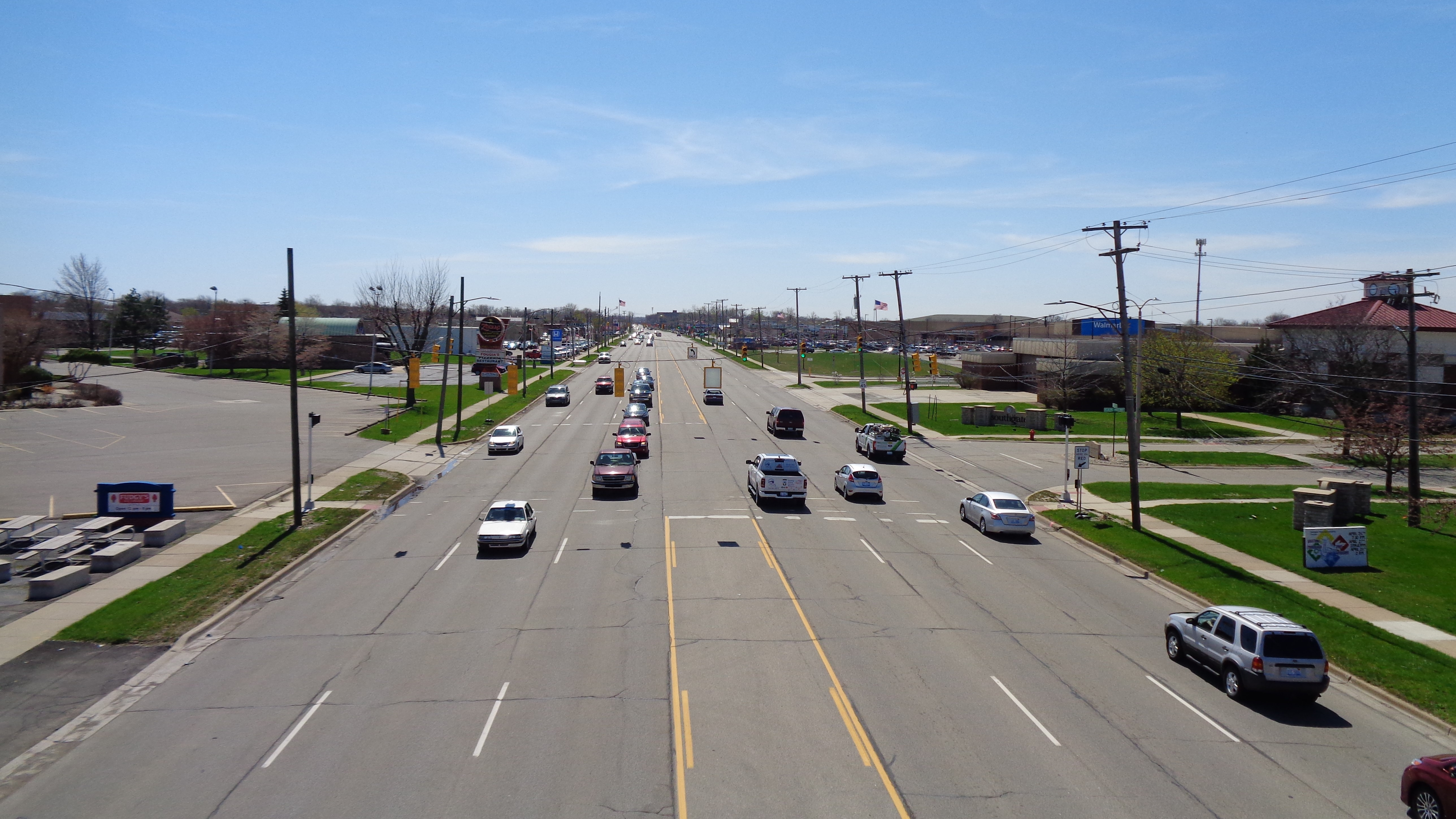
Dix-Toledo Road

=== Transportation ===
==== Highways ====
- I-75 runs south–north through the northwest corner of the city.
- US 25 was the designation for Dix-Toledo Highway between 1929 and 1967. Afterward, it ran as a concurrency with I-75 until its decommissioning in 1973.
- M-85, known locally as Fort Street, runs south–north and forms most of the eastern boundary of the city with Wyandotte.

==== Rail ====
The Conrail Shared Assets Lincoln Secondary, used primarily by CSX Transportation freight trains that run between Detroit and Toledo, Ohio, runs through the northwest corner of Southgate and is notable for the large grade crossing (one of the largest in the world) through the intersection of Northline and Allen Roads, and also has a crossing at Reeck Road.

==== Public transportation ====
Four Suburban Mobility Authority for Regional Transportation bus routes pass through Southgate.

== Significant landmarks ==
The Southgate Tower in Southgate is the tallest building in the city, and visible across the city. Renovations are being carried out by Southgate Tower, LLC, and its management company, Beztak, to turn the office building into apartments. Apartments will be available in winter 2026.

== Notable people ==
- Ashley Qualls, internet business entrepreneur
- Marcie Bolen, Von Bondies Rock and Roll garage band
