= M-85 (Michigan highway) =

State highway in Wayne County, Michigan, United States

M-85
- Fort Street
- M-85 highlighted in red

Route information
- Maintained by MDOT
- Length: 21.882 mi (35.216 km)
- Existed: 1956–present
- Tourist routes: Lake Erie Circle Tour

Major junctions
- South end: I-75 near Rockwood
- I-75 in Detroit
- North end: Griswold Street in Detroit

Location
- Country: United States
- State: Michigan
- Counties: Wayne

Highway system
- Michigan State Trunkline Highway System; Interstate; US; State; Byways
← M-84	→ M-86

M-85, also known as Fort Street or Fort Road for its entire length, is a state trunkline highway in the U.S. state of Michigan. The highway serves several Downriver suburbs of Detroit, as well as neighborhoods in the city itself. From its southern terminus at exit 28 on Interstate 75 (I-75) to its second interchange with exit 43 on I-75 in southwest Detroit, M-85 is part of the Lake Erie Circle Tour. In between, it serves mostly residential areas running parallel to a pair of rail lines; the highway carries between 5,000 and 43,000 vehicles per day on average. Once in the city of Detroit, Fort Street runs parallel to I-75 for several miles before they separate near the Ambassador Bridge. The northern end of M-85 is at the intersection with Griswold Street in downtown Detroit, one block away from Campus Martius Park.

Two previous unrelated highways bore the M-85 designation. The first was in Montcalm County and the second near Caro. These uses were retired in the 1930s and the 1940s, respectively. The current M-85 was created in 1956 after the construction of the Detroit-Toledo Freeway; the original northern end was at an intersection with US Highway 25 (US 25) in downtown. The northern end was truncated in the late 1960s to the northern junction with I-75. The highway was then extended back into downtown Detroit in the first year of the 21st century.

== Route description ==
M-85 starts a directional interchange with I-75 in near Rockwood; traffic to or from southbound I-75 must use Gibraltar Road instead. M-85 runs north from this interchange to Gibraltar Road as a full freeway; north of that intersection the highway becomes a boulevard. There are many businesses directly adjacent to Fort Street in the Downriver area with residential subdivisions on either side of them. The trunkline parallels a pair of rail lines. In this area, M-85 also runs parallel to, but inland from, the southern part of the Detroit River. The highway runs northeasterly through Gibraltar to Trenton, where it turns due north. Fort Street forms the boundary between Riverview and Trenton in the area near the Riverview Landing Shopping Center between King and Sibley Roads; north of here, Riverview extends along both sides of the road. At Pennsylvania Road, Fort Street crosses into the city of Southgate and curves to the northeast near the Southgate Tower office building. The highway returns to a due northerly course near Memorial Park and continues along the Southgate–Wyandotte city line. This area is mainly residential neighborhoods that extend in street grids on either side of the Fort Street boulevard, including the Old Homestead neighborhood of Southgate.

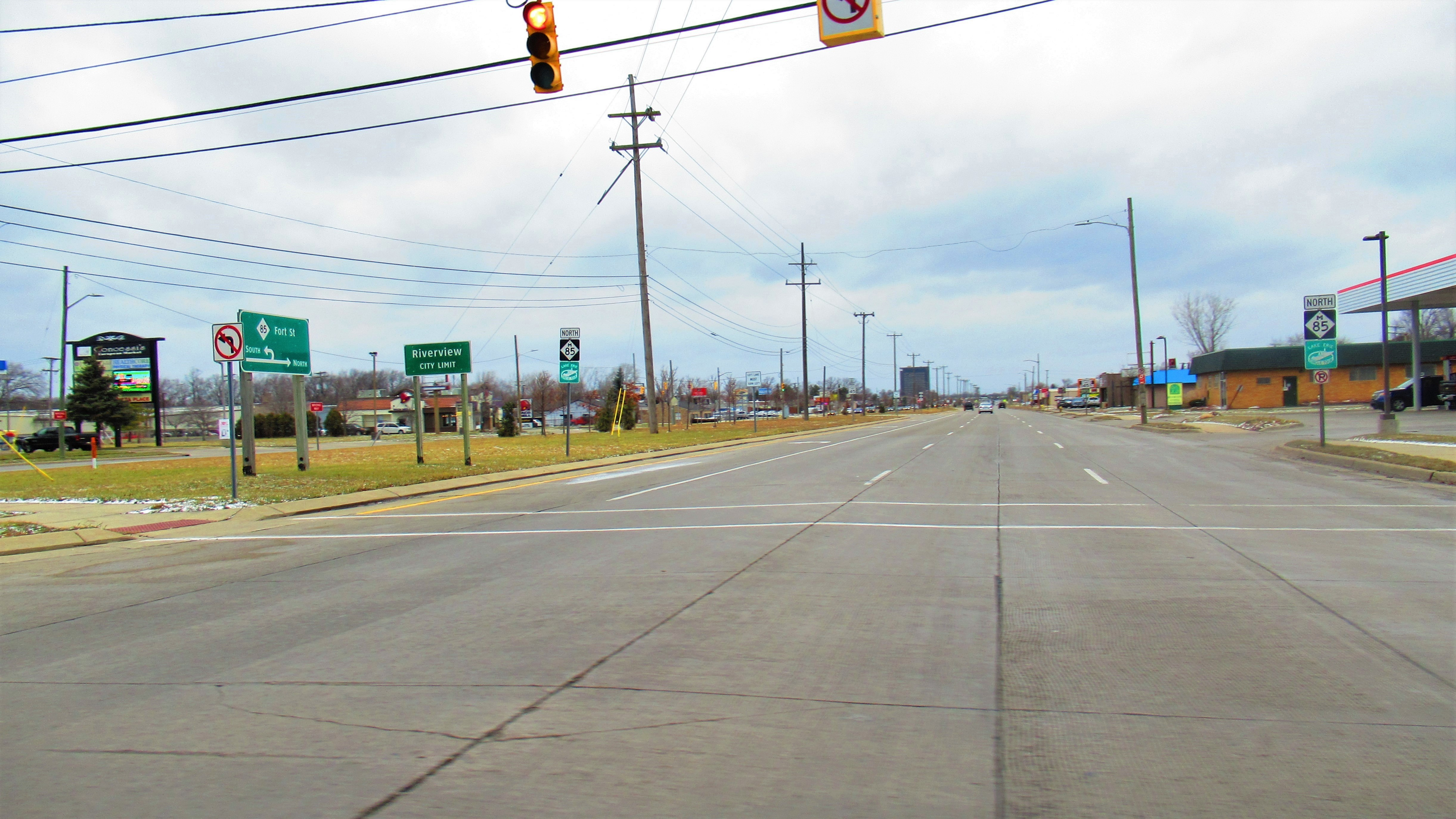
Northbound lanes in Riverview

The highway crosses the South Branch of the Ecorse River and enters the city of Lincoln Park, through which Fort Street angles slightly northeasterly before turning sharply to the northeast at Champaign Road. M-85's new direction keeps it parallel to the Detroit River about one mile (1.6 km) away. When the trunkline crosses the North Branch of the Ecorse River, M-85 enters the city of Detroit near Outer Drive. Fort Street runs parallel to I-75 through the Boynton–Oakwood Heights neighborhoods of the city. North of the intersection with Schaefer Highway, M-85 meets an interchange with I-75 and passes under the freeway, crossing to its northwest side. At this interchange, the LECT designation is transferred from M-85 to I-75. Fort Street continues running between an industrial area and I-75. In this area, the highway crosses the River Rouge and turns east-northeast. Fort Street continues through the Delray neighborhood and past Woodmere Cemetery before crossing under I-75 again; there is no interchange at this location. These two highways continue in parallel to the north of Fort Wayne and under the approaches for the Gordie Howe International Bridge; M-85 intersects Grand Boulevard and passes under the approaches for the Ambassador Bridge; I-75 turns inland near the bridge's toll plaza north of Fort Street. M-85 continues along the river into the Corktown neighborhood.

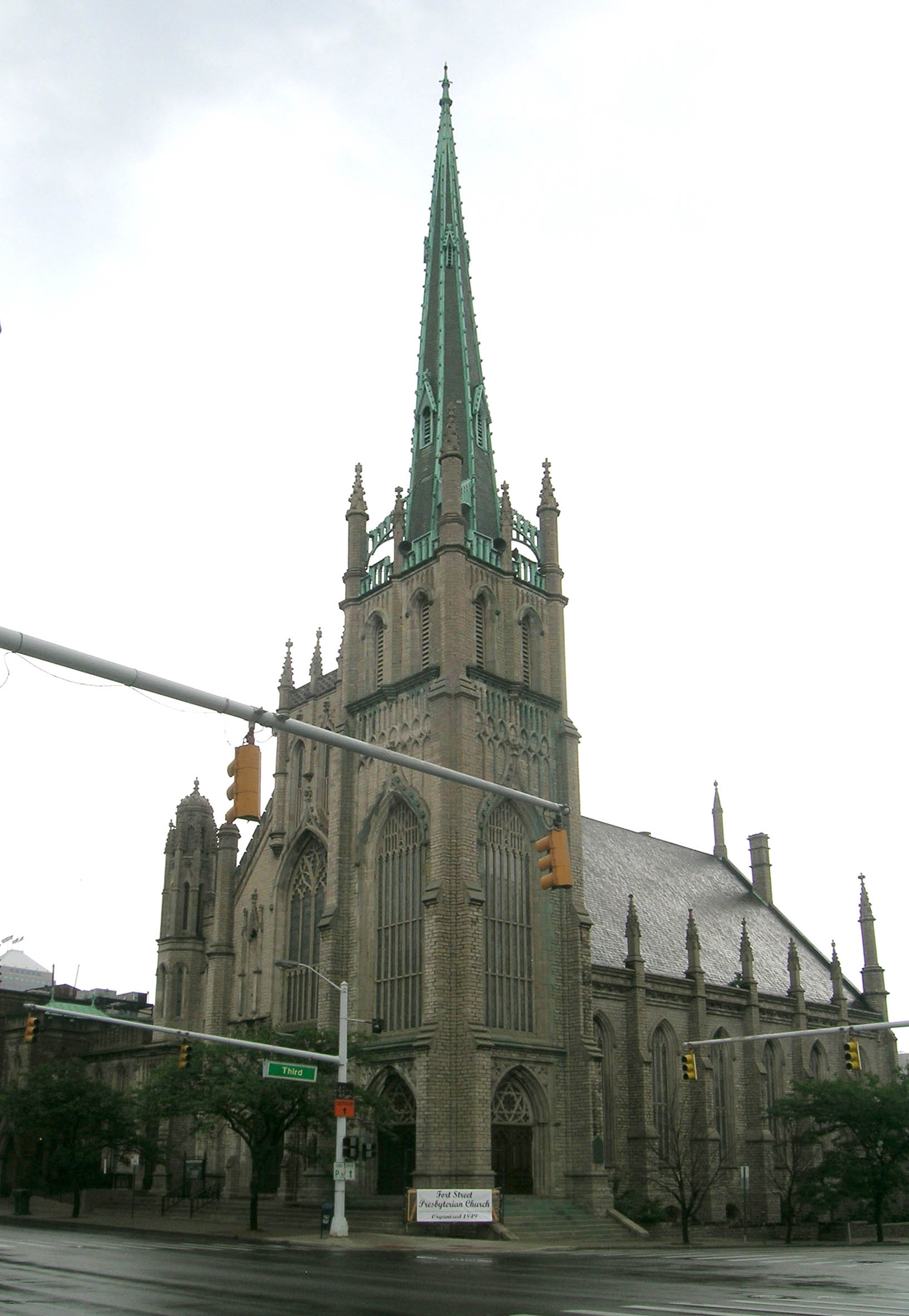
Fort Street Presbyterian Church

As M-85 approaches downtown, it crosses over the CPKC Railway-owned Michigan Central Railway Tunnel. Several blocks later, the highway passes over M-10 (Lodge Freeway) without an interchange near Huntington Place. Fort Street continues carrying the M-85 designation as far east as the intersection with Griswold Street, one block west of Campus Martius Park.

M-85 is maintained by the Michigan Department of Transportation (MDOT) like other state highways in Michigan. As a part of these maintenance responsibilities, the department tracks the volume of traffic that uses the roadways under its jurisdiction. These volumes are expressed using a metric called annual average daily traffic, which is a statistical calculation of the average daily number of vehicles on a segment of roadway. MDOT's surveys in 2010 showed that the highest traffic levels along M-85 were the 42,786 vehicles daily in Wyandotte; the lowest count was 5,976 vehicles per day at the southern terminus. All of M-85 has been listed on the National Highway System, a network of roads important to the country's economy, defense, and mobility. Between the two I-75 interchanges, M-85 is the closest state trunkline to Lake Erie and the Detroit River, making it a part of the Lake Erie Circle Tour (LECT).

== History ==
=== Previous designations ===
In 1919, the first version of M-85 ran from then M-66 east to M-43 at Stanton in Montcalm County. This highway was later extended in 1929 from Stanton north to Edmore. By the end of 1930, this designation was removed when M-57 was extended through the area. A new M-85 was then designated between Mayville and Caro. This second designation was supplanted by an extended and rerouted M-24 in late 1941 or early 1942.

=== Current designation ===
When the Detroit–Toledo Freeway opened in 1956, several local roads were given the M-85 designation between the new freeway in Woodhaven into downtown Detroit to end at US 25/M-17. The northern end was truncated in 1968 to the interchange with I-75 in Detroit when that freeway was completed in the area. In the 1980s, the Great Lakes Circle Tours were created by the state of Michigan in consultation with neighboring states and the province of Ontario; after the tours were created in 1986, M-85 was added to the LECT.

At the end of 2000, MDOT proposed several highway transfers in Detroit. Some of these involved transferring city streets in the Campus Martius Park area under the department's jurisdiction to city control; another part of the proposal involved MDOT assuming control over a section of Fort Street from the then northern terminus of M-85 to the then southern terminus of M-3 at Clark Street. When these transfers were completed the following year, M-3 was severed into two discontinuous segments by the Campus Martius changes, and the southern segment between Clark and Griswold streets was added to an extended M-85.

== Major intersections ==
The entire highway is in Wayne County.

Location	mi	km	Destinations	Notes
Brownstown Township	0.000	0.000	I-75 / LECT – Detroit, Toledo	Exit 28 on I-75; southern end of LECT concurrency
Detroit	15.068	24.250	I-75 / LECT	Exit 43 on I-75; northern end of LECT concurrency
Detroit	21.882	35.216	Griswold Street	
1.000 mi = 1.609 km; 1.000 km = 0.621 mi: Concurrency terminus
