= Fordson Island =

Island in Michigan

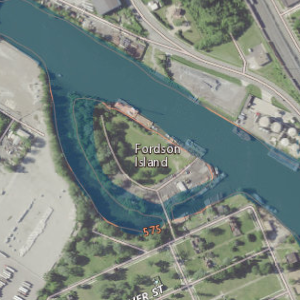
- USGS aerial imagery of Fordson Island

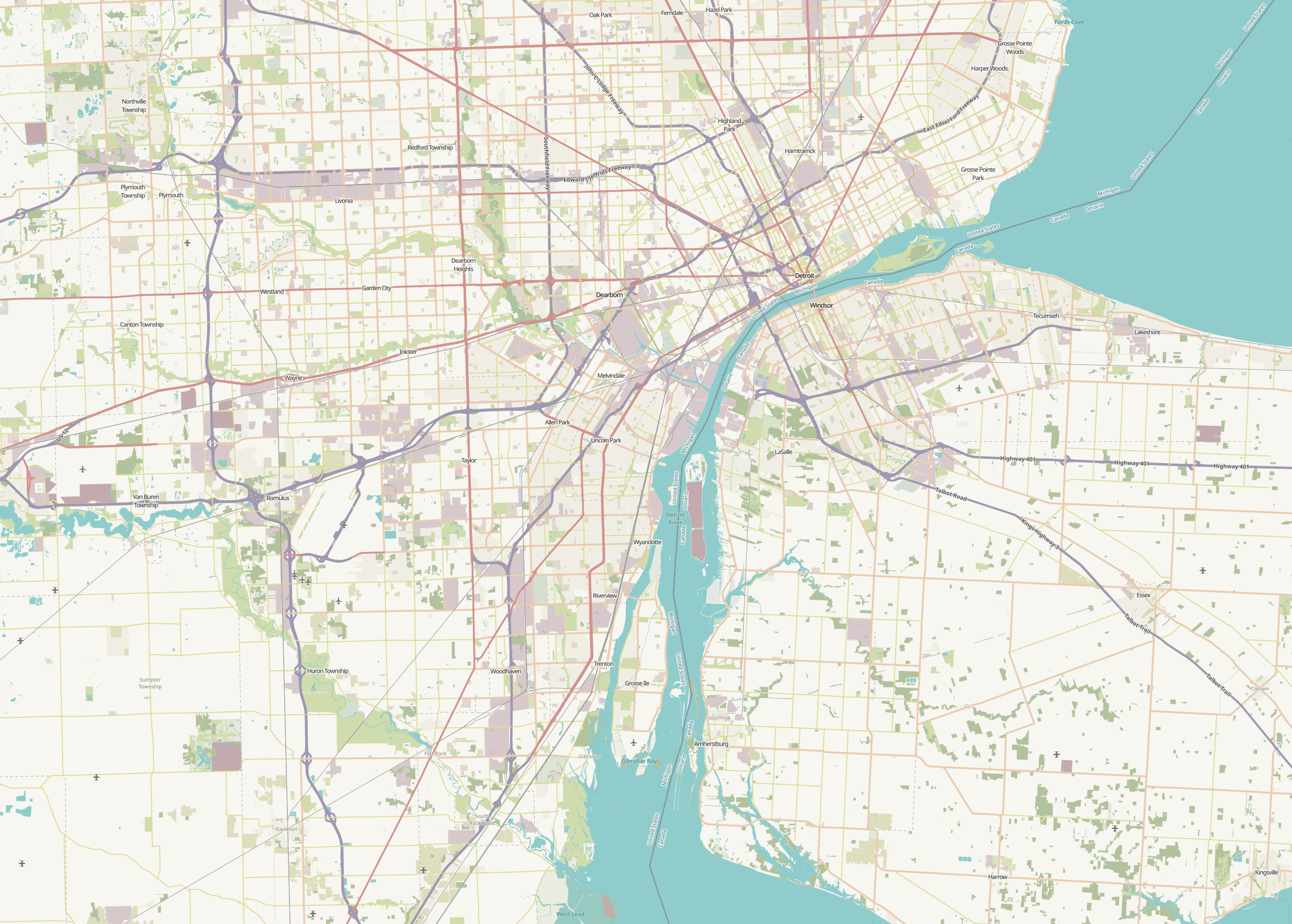
- Location within Wayne County, Michigan Location within Michigan Location within the United States

Geography
- Location: Michigan
- Coordinates: 42°17′37″N 83°08′52″W
- Area: 8.4 acres (3.4 ha)
- Length: 0.25 mi (0.4 km)
- Width: 0.125 mi (0.201 km)
- Highest elevation: 574 ft (175 m)

Administration
- United States
- State: Michigan
- County: Wayne

Fordson Island is an 8.4-acre (3.4 ha) artificial island in the River Rouge, in southeast Michigan. It was created by the Ford Motor Company in 1918, while dredging the River Rouge, and the land was donated to Springwells Township by Henry Ford. It eventually became part of the City of Dearborn, which became aware of its existence in 1980; since its creation, it has been home to liquor smugglers, industrial facilities, several residents, a marina, and numerous abandoned watercraft. By the mid-1980s, the island was mostly uninhabited; in the early 2000s numerous abandoned vessels were dumped on its shores.

== Geography ==
Fordson Island is in Wayne County. Its coordinates are 42°17′37″N 83°08′52″W, and the United States Geological Survey (USGS) gave its elevation as 574 ft (175 m) in 1980. The 8.4 acres (3.4 ha) island is "about a quarter mile long and perhaps half that wide". It is located at the junction between Detroit and Dearborn; while it is a part of Dearborn, it is an exclave and can only be accessed by going through Detroit. To its northeast is the straightened 125 ft (38 m) channel now followed by the River Rouge; to its southwest, it is bounded by a 20 ft (6.1 m) stream that constituted the river's original course. It is upstream of Zug Island.

== History ==
Fordson Island was created in 1918 by the Ford Motor Company. In order to create a shipping channel through which lake freighters carrying ore could access the company's River Rouge Complex, the River Rouge was dredged; straightening the channel of the river caused a small piece of land to be cut off, creating an island (which was donated to the city by Henry Ford). The island was originally a part of Springwells Township, which became a village, and later the City of Springwells, whose name was changed to the City of Fordson. Residents eventually voted to merge into surrounding municipalities; the area containing Fordson Island became a part of Dearborn in 1929. The city of Dearborn would remain largely unaware of its existence until 1980, when a firm hired to appraise land in the city of Dearborn discovered Fordson Island. An employee later said:

I never knew an island existed. Nobody in the firm knew it existed. I sent a woman down there to look at it and she couldn't find it. And she's lived in Dearborn for 10 years.

During Prohibition, several speakeasies operated on the island; it served as a "handy turnaround" for rum runners, whose feuds and rivalries occasionally resulted in gunfire. A small cottage on the island was destroyed by fire in 1936, causing one death which was later ruled an accident; the speakeasies, too, were demolished by the early 1940s. Businesses, including the A.J. Dupuis Pile Driving Company, operated there in the mid-20th century. The Hopwoods, a family who moved onto the island in 1947, rented a house for $50 (equivalent to $721 in 2025) a month. They described it to the Detroit Free Press as having been "wild and full of nature", although oil from nearby industries occasionally collected near the banks of the river and caught fire:

It's changed a lot since we lived there. It was much more wild and full of nature. Across the little dirt road, it was just kind of like a swamp. You'd see a lot of birds. It was a pretty place to live. It was very exciting to see the big boats go by. We used to skate out in back of the house, when the Rouge would ice over [...] It was pretty rustic. If you didn't look in the direction of the Rouge plant, you could always see pheasant.

By the 1980s, Marathon Oil had constructed a transfer facility on the island, the Fordson Island Terminal; for which they had applied for a permit in 1979 to discharge treated ship ballast water. In 1981, only four men lived on the island: William, Robert, Willie and Frank. Joseph, with whom William had maintained a violent rivalry over the course of multiple decades, had died several years earlier; his abandoned house was destroyed by vandals in April 1981. Rev. Leslie Lamb, a retired ship captain and electrician, purchased part of the island around 1976, which he used to restore shipwrecks and old boats.

William operated a marina for many years, which closed after his death in 1984. Three years later, plans were submitted to the Michigan Department of Natural Resources for the marina to be reopened; the proposed site would have dock space for 13 boats up to 30 ft (9.1 m) long. The plan was still mentioned as a potential future development in a December 1999 Detroit Free Press article.

In 1987, the city of Dearborn condemned two of the island's residences, and the Marathon facility occupied "most of the island" by 1987. In 1987, Marathon was discharging up to 15,000 US gal (57,000 L; 12,000 imp gal) of treated ballast water to the River Rouge on an intermittent basis.

By the 2000s, marine debris had become a nuisance, as Fordson Island started to become a "boat graveyard". Abandoned boats first reported on the shore of the island in 2005 remained there in July 2007, even after a June campaign to pick up trash and remove weeds from the island. In 2010, the Detroit/Wayne County Port Authority removed debris (including abandoned boats) from the western shores of the island, and in May 2011, 21 boats were removed.
