= History of Hungarian Americans in Metro Detroit =

The Hungarian people and Hungarian Americans immigrated to Metro Detroit in the 20th century. Historically they populated Delray in Detroit but moved to the Downriver area in the 1960s. There were four historic waves of Hungarian immigration to Detroit.

== History ==
In the late 1890s, Hungarians began to populate Detroit. They settled Delray in Southwest Detroit. In 1898 the Michigan Malleable Iron Company began operations in Delray. Hungarian immigrants moved to Delray from cities including Cleveland Ohio; South Bend, Indiana; and Toledo, Ohio in order to get better working conditions and better wages. On 14 December 1904 the First Hungarian Evangelical & Reformed Church on West End in (Delray) Detroit, MI was organized. In 1905 a Hungarian Catholic church opened in Delray. The current Holy Cross Hungarian Catholic Church building opened by 1925. Hungarians became one of the largest groups to settle Detroit in the early 20th century. The Delray-Springwells area served as the "Little Hungary" of Detroit and Michigan's Hungarian culture was centered in that community. The first wave of Hungarian refugees came to the U.S. in order to escape the Austro-Hungarian Empire's political issues.

After World War I a second wave of Hungarian refugees, who escaped due to religious and political reasons, arrived. These Hungarians became refugees because several territories had been separated from the Hungarian homeland. They selected Detroit because the automobile plants paid high wages. Many Hungarians in the second wave had intended to return to Hungary. However Detroit's Historic Places of Worship stated that "strong community ties and the relative betterment of daily life kept them in America." Some of those who came in this wave had previously worked in coal mines in Pennsylvania. As the number of Hungarians in Delray increased, a new church of the Holy Cross Hungarian Catholic Church opened in 1925.

In 1935 Doanne Erdmann Beynon, author of "Crime and Custom of the Hungarians of Detroit", wrote that Detroit "has never been a "first port of entry" to any considerable number of Hungarian immigrants." Hungarians coming to Detroit had lived in other U.S. cities before coming to Detroit and Beynon wrote that they usually "have become acculturated, at least partially, to Hungarian-American life prior to their migration to Detroit." Beynon wrote that the immigrants had lived in a "rather homogenous" society in small communities "which are least affected by modern industrial civilization" and that "their lives had been moulded and controlled by the traditional folk culture."

Another wave of Hungarians appeared after World War II ended. In 1951 there were about 55,000 ethnic Hungarians in Metro Detroit. Another wave of Hungarians, those against the Communist forces, escaped the Hungarian Revolution of 1956, causing more to arrive in Delray. The construction of Interstate 75 in the mid-1960s destroyed large parts of Delray and divided the community into two pieces. Middle and working class Hungarians moved to Detroit's downriver suburbs Allen Park, Lincoln Park, Melvindale, and Riverview. Some Hungarians also moved to Taylor. The Holy Cross parish school closed. These suburbanites then commuted to their jobs in Detroit along the new expressways.

As of the 1990 U.S. census there were 7,712 speakers of the Hungarian language at home in the State of Michigan. This declined to 4,851 in the 2000 U.S. census. Miklós Kontra, the author of the "Hungarian" entry in The American Midwest: An Interpretive Encyclopedia, wrote that the decline in this number and similar numbers in the American Midwest illustrates "the rapid assimilation of Hungarian Americans."

== Religion ==
In Delray, the First Hebrew Congregation of Delray (first known as the Orthodox Hungarian Jewish Congregation) was located on Burdeno St. near Fort Wayne. It was operated by Hungarian Jews and was Detroit's first Orthodox synagogue east of Woodward Avenue. There were several Hungarian Reformed Churches in Delray; only the American Hungarian Reformed Church located in Allen Park remains in existence.

== Institutions ==
The Hungarian Cultural Center is located in Taylor. The center and the American Hungarian Reformed Church in Allen Park host cultural and social events. Hungarian-born and Hungarian-descent residents living in suburbs travel to these events. As of 2006 veterans of the Hungarian Revolution of 1956 have annual gatherings at the center.

By 1935 various Hungarian social clubs including athletic, altar, dramatic, sick benefit and insurance, singing (Dalárdák), and social clubs were formed. Each club included a membership and a wider group of adherents or pártolók. Beynon wrote that "Practically every Hungarian of Detroit who has not broken away entirely from the people of his own nationality is connected in some way with one or more of these societies or clubs." A former editor of the Detroiti Ujság, Dr. Charles Földy, stated that "These clubs make up the varied life of our colony. If a man isolates himself from all of them, he is not a member of the Hungarian colony any longer." Beynon wrote that the clubs exercise the social control previously enforced by village groups back in Hungary. The Federation of Hungarian Churches and Societies (Hungarian: A Detroiti Magyar Egyházak és Egyletek Nagybizottsága) represented and taxed all of the social clubs. Some organizations, such as the Socialist Labor Party, established multiple clubs to appeal to multiple types of people.

Historic institutions included the Hungarian Country Club, the Hungarian Athletic Club, and the Hungarian Women's Club. The country club organized rural-based activities such as hikes and picnics. The women's club, which held card parties, lectures, and musical programs, had offices on West Jefferson Avenue.

== Culture and social life ==
Steve Babson, author of Working Detroit, stated that in the 1920s, women from Hungarian and Finnish houses had "considerably more freedom" compared to those from Italian and Macedonian houses. Women from Hungarian and Finnish houses opened social groups for both sexes such as political, benevolent, and sports groups; women from the ethnicities often had more encouragement to attend high school and further education compared to Italians and Macedonians. In the late 1920s Lois Rankin of the International Institute of Detroit stated that in Detroit "as in the home country, Magyar [Hungarian] women occupy a position of equality with men, and there is little subservience to be noted in their attitude."

Historically Hungarians in Detroit celebrated "Day of Sorrow" on October 16, a tribute to the 1848 hangings of 13 generals.

== See also ==
- Demographics of Metro Detroit
- History of the Italian Americans in Metro Detroit
- History of the Polish Americans in Metro Detroit
