= History of Italian Americans in Metro Detroit =

The National Italian American Foundation estimated that in 1990, Metro Detroit had 280,000 ethnic Italians.

== History ==
The first ethnic Italian in Detroit was Alfonso Tonti, a Frenchman with an Italian immigrant father. He was the second-in-command of Antoine de la Mothe Cadillac, who established Detroit in 1701. Tonti's child, born in 1703, was the first ethnic European child born in Detroit. Tonti became the commander of the Detroit fort after Cadillac left to return to France.

In order to preserve the fur trade, the French administrators and the British administrators discouraged immigration, so the Italian population had slow growth. Growth in immigration increased after Detroit became a part of the United States and the Erie Canal had been constructed. Armando Delicato, author of Italians in Detroit, wrote that Italian immigration to Detroit "lagged behind other cities in the East".

In 1904 the City of Detroit had 900 Italians. In Metro Detroit there were several thousand ethnic Italians by 1900. The concentrations of the population lived in Eastern Market and east of the area presently known as Greektown. Of those Italians in 1900 most originated from Genoa, Lombardy, and Sicily. Some Italians stayed in Detroit temporarily before traveling onwards to mines in northern Michigan.

The increase in the automobile industry resulted in the increase of the Italian population in the 20th Century. By 1925 the number of Italians in the City of Detroit increased to 42,000. The historical center of Detroit's Italian-American community was in an area along Gratiot Avenue, east of Downtown Detroit. During that period, Italian immigrants and their children lived throughout the City of Detroit, and several neighborhoods had concentrations of Italian immigrants. There were larger numbers of southern Italians than those from the north. Armando Delicato, author of Italians in Detroit, wrote that "Unlike many other American cities, no region of Italy was totally dominant in this area". Steve Babson, author of Working Detroit: The Making of a Union Town, wrote that "Many northern Italians, coming from an urban and industrialized society, had little in common with local Sicilians, who came from the rural and clannish south." In Detroit's history, within the crafts Italians concentrated on tileworking.

During World War II, Fort Wayne (Detroit) served as home to Italian prisoners of war (POWs) captured during the North African Campaign. After Italy's surrender in September 1943, the POWs were given the opportunity to work as servants, cooks, and janitors. At the end of the war many chose to remain and settle in Detroit.

As of 1951 Detroit had about 150,000 Italians.

The National Italian American Foundation estimated that in 1990, Metro Detroit had 280,000 ethnic Italians. As of 2005 the closest remaining large Little Italy near Detroit was Via Italia in Windsor, Ontario and there was a group of remaining Italian shops and restaurants along Garfield Road in Clinton Township. In 2005 Delicato wrote that "Unlike some other national groups, like the Poles, who still look to Hamtramck, or the Mexicans, who have Mexicantown, Italian Detroiters no longer have a geographical center".

== Media ==
In early 20th century there were two Italian newspapers: La Tribuna Italiana d'America and La Voce del Popolo. La Tribuna was pro-Benito Mussolini and La Voce was anti-Mussolini. La Voce and was one of two Italian newspapers still published by 1951. In addition another paper, L'Avvenire, had been established by 1937.

Voce published stories about Italian and American affairs and European viewpoints. The report Ethnic groups in Detroit stated that Voce had an "independent point of view" and that it was "said to be the only Italian paper carrying on a campaign against the underworld." La Tribuna encouraged political organization among Italians to increase the community's political clout. L'Avvenire focused on politics and advocated for a compact political group representing the Italian community.

The Italian Tribune, which was founded in 1909, became a weekly newspaper in a period before 2004.

== Institutions ==
The Dante Alighieri Society – Michigan Chapter promotes Italian language and culture through education and cultural event, Il Mosaico newsletter, and other cultural resources. In addition to Italian courses, the Dante Alighieri Society maintains La Biblioteca Italiana, a substantial Italian-language collection held at Oakland Community College in Royal Oak for members and the community at-large and a DVD lending library for members. For younger members and student members, there is the Gruppo Giovanile, which organized activities with the interests of the youth in mind. History of the Dante Alighieri Society The inaugural meeting of the Società Dante Alighieri in Michigan was held on December 21, 1924, at the Detroit Public Library Main Branch. The guiding purpose was "to promote Italian cultural programs." www.dantemichigan.org

The Italian American Cultural Society (IACS)'s offices are located in Clinton Township. The society supports the Italian American Cultural Center, which houses the society offices, and the Tivoli Manor senior housing center in Warren.

The IACS building is located on Romeo Plank Road, north of 19 Mile, on the northern edge of the township. It is in proximity to the former ex-Partridge Creek clubhouse. The center had been located in Warren for a 20-year period. In 2004 it moved to its current location. Its previous location was sold to a charter school in July 2004. In 2005 the Italian American Cultural Center decided to continue using its existing name.

In the 1920s, women were barred from most Italian lodges and societies, and the Figli d'Italia placed its female members in separate lodges.

In 1951 Italians celebrated American holidays and religious holidays.

== Culture ==
According to Babson, during the 1920s men "were the unquestioned authority and usually the sole breadwinner among adult members"of Italian families, especially those from Sicily, and that wives of first generation immigrants were only able to socialize in the house, marketplace, and church. Only one Italian social club accepted women and the club segregated women into special groups. Babson stated that in the 1920s many young ethnic Italians born in the United States "often rebelled against the isolation and sexual segregation imposed by their parents." Of the ethnic Sicilians, the number of women working outside of the house was very small.

== Society ==
The Consulate of Italy in Detroit is located in Suite 1840 in the Buhl Building in Downtown Detroit.

In 1951 there were three Italian funeral homes.

== Socioeconomic status ==
According to Ethnic Communities of Greater Detroit, 1970, Italians were "in terms of their occupation, their education, and their income", the "least successful" immigrant group along with the Poles.

== See also ==
- Demographics of Metro Detroit
- History of the Hungarian Americans in Metro Detroit
- History of the Polish Americans in Metro Detroit
