= History of Polish Americans in Metro Detroit =

In 2023, Polish Americans are most heavily concentrated in the Upper Midwest and Northeast regions of the United States. As the second most Polish populated state, Michigan follows closely behind Illinois with 784,200 people identifying as Polish, or 7.82% of the state's population, identifying as Polish. Many of these Polish Americans live in the Metro Detroit area of Michigan.

== History ==
=== Wyandotte ===
==== Origin of the Polish Settlement ====
The City of Wyandotte is situated along the Detroit River and the old Michigan Central Railroad. Wyandotte is located about 15 miles to the south of Detroit. At the 1940 census, the population of the city was approximately 35,000 people. Of this total there were over 9,000 Poles grouped within the neighborhoods of the three Polish parishes at that time: Our Lady of Mount Carmel (1899–2013), St. Stanislaus Kostka (1914–2013), and St. Helena (1927–2007).

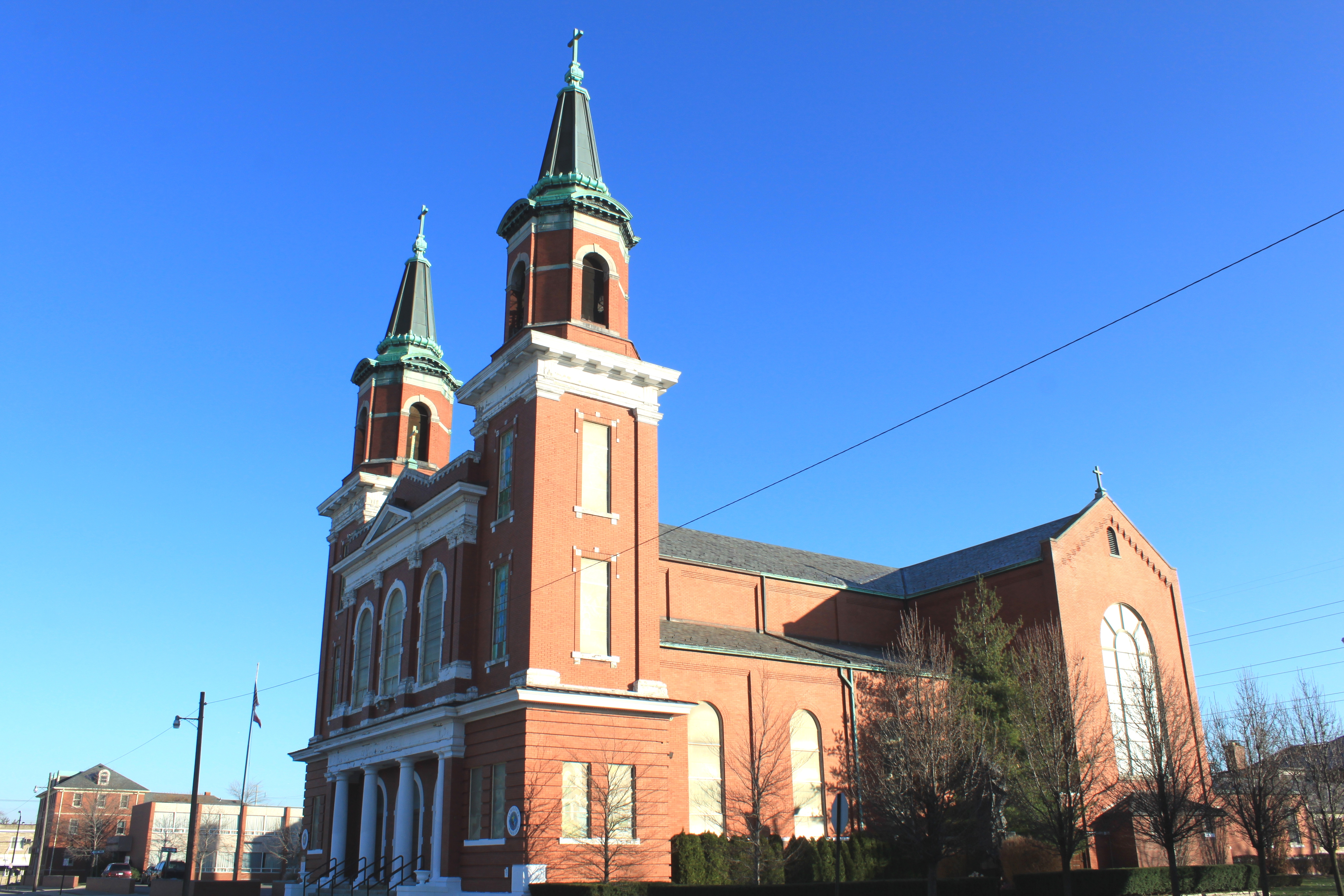
Our Lady of Mt. Carmel Church

==== The Society of St. Stanislaus Kostka ====
Following the Austro-Prussian War of 1866, Anthony Zynger emigrated to the United States and was the first Pole to arrive in Wyandotte where he found employment in one of the many factories in the city at the time. In 1868, Anthony Lesczynski emigrated to the United States and arrived in Wyandotte. In the course of time, he opened a grocery store at the intersection of Oak and 4th Streets. On November 22, 1870, a mission was preached at the store by Rev. Xavier Szulak, S.J., and it was during this mission that Anthony Lesczynski officially established the Society of St. Stanislaus Kostka. By this time, there were several Polish families living in Wyandotte and membership reached 37 members. In 1872, during the dedication of St. Albertus Catholic Church in Detroit, this society was represented by Anthony Zynger and Anthony Lesczynski.

In 1875, hard times struck the laboring class in Wyandotte. Conditions became so intolerable that during an 1876 depression many of the first Polish families were forced to leave Wyandotte and moved to Arkansas and other states. The depression lifted in 1877 and many new Polish families began to arrive in Wyandotte. Conditions again became bad and many of these families soon left for the neighboring cities of Ecorse and Detroit. Owing to this forced departure, the Society of St. Stanislaus Kostka could not survive and dissolved for lack of membership.

In 1888, when more members could be counted upon, the Society was revived by Francis Michalak who was elected President by 47 new members. The Board of Directors consisted of: Francis Michalak, President; Joseph Kasprzyk, Vice President; Stephan Zalewski, Secretary; M. Ozowski, Cashier; and Martin Grabarkiewicz, Cashier Protector.

The Society received sacraments regularly at the Irish church of St. Patrick in Wyandotte. At first, they received sacraments at the German church of St. Joseph in Wyandotte, but transferred to St. Patrick Church due to discrimination. Once a month, a Polish priest administered to their spiritual needs. This was rendered very often by Rev. Vitold Buchaczkowski from SS. Cyril and Methodius Polish Seminary in Detroit. A special feature of this service was an annual indulgence imparted to them on Easter Sunday and on the feast day of St. Stanislaus Kostka.

From 1888 to 1898, 150 Polish families arrived in Wyandotte and settled in a small village west of Wyandotte named Glenwood. Although only partially organized, the Poles began to plan to establish a parish in which they could be ministered to in the Polish language. A committee was organized by the society to make the initial steps toward organizing and pushing the matter to its desirable conclusion with the approval of the Bishop of Detroit. They consisted of: Martin Grabarkiewicz, Thomas Biniasz, Michael Sawinski, Frank Lybik, Martin Ignasiak, and Michael Dolinski

==== Our Lady of Mount Carmel Parish ====
The first business transaction of the building committee concerned the purchase of several lots in Glenwood, on Superior and Pulaski Boulevard (now 10th Street) from the Welch Brother's Realty Company. This deal was fulfilled, and Welch Brother's Company donated eight lots for the building of the proposed church and school. On September 8, 1899, the Most Rev. John Foley personally inspected the grounds. He approved the location and almost immediately appointed Rev. Bernard Zmijewski as pastor. Fr. Zmijewski became pastor on September 18, 1899. Since the church building was still in the planning stage, he was constrained to hold services at St. Patrick's Church.

The charter parishioners desired to name the parish "Our Lady of the Scapular," however; because Bishop Foley did not recognize this folksy title, he instead named the new parish "Our Lady of Mount Carmel." In effect, since the beginning, parishioners had always referred to the parish with the Polish "Szkaplerznej" or, "Scapular."

The laying of the cornerstone of a combination of church and school under the title of "Our Lady of Mount Carmel" took place on December 3, 1899, and the formal dedication of the completed structure was held on July 8, 1900. Rev. John Moneta, professor from SS. Cyril and Methodius Polish Seminary in Detroit preached the homily. The choir from St. Josaphat Church in Detroit, under the direction of Zygmunt Kadlubowski, added much to the solemnity of the dedication.

The church building also served as an elementary school. Fr. Zmijewski petitioned Mother Cajetan, Mother Provincial of the Felician Sisters in Detroit, an earnest appeal for the Felician Sisters to take charge of the school. In September, 1901, the Felician Sisters opened two classrooms in the basement to teach the first and second grades. The following year, 113 boys and girls were enrolled in the school. The sisters lived in the school for over 15 years before a convent was built.

In 1916, Fr. Grudzinki erected the present Our Lady of Mt. Carmel Church and the Felician Sisters convent. After the new church was completed, the original building was turned over for exclusive school use and additions were made. The present church is a prime example of the so-called 'Polish Cathedral style' of churches in both its opulence and grand scale.

The Polish diaspora in Wyandotte is very active today.

=== Detroit ===
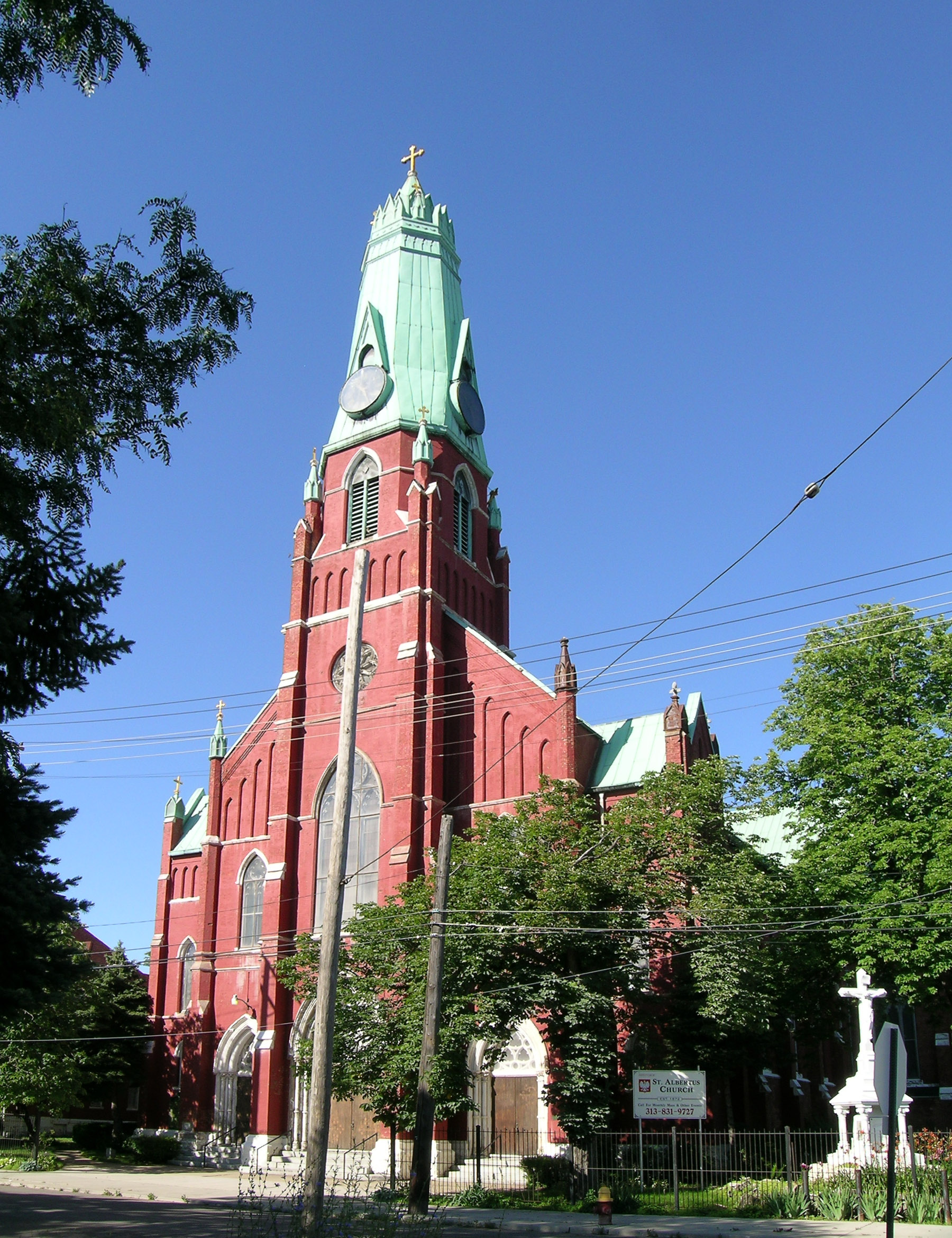
St. Albertus Roman Catholic Church in Detroit

In the 1880s Polish immigration to Detroit started.

In 1904 the City of Detroit had 13,000 Polish people. By 1925 the number of Polish people increased to 115,000. In the 1910 count of Detroit's population, the Polish population was not distinguished because Poland was not yet independent. Steve Babson, author of Working Detroit: The Making of a Union Town, wrote that "Thus, at least half of the "Germans" counted were probably Poles." After World War I the U.S. government began counting Poles as a separate ethnic group. At that period it was the largest ethnic group in Detroit.

In 1910 the Dodge Brothers opened an automobile plant in Hamtramck. This caused an increase in Polish immigration. By 1920 about 66% of the Hamtramck's residents were Polish-born. Of the remaining residents, most were ethnic Polish. In 1922 Hamtramck became a municipality, electing a Pole as its first mayor. George Tysh of the Metro Times stated that "In the early days of the auto industry, Hamtramck’s population swelled with Poles, so much so that you were more likely to hear Polish spoken on Joseph Campau than any other tongue." For portions of the 20th century the Polish community was centered on Hamtramck and Detroit's Poletown.

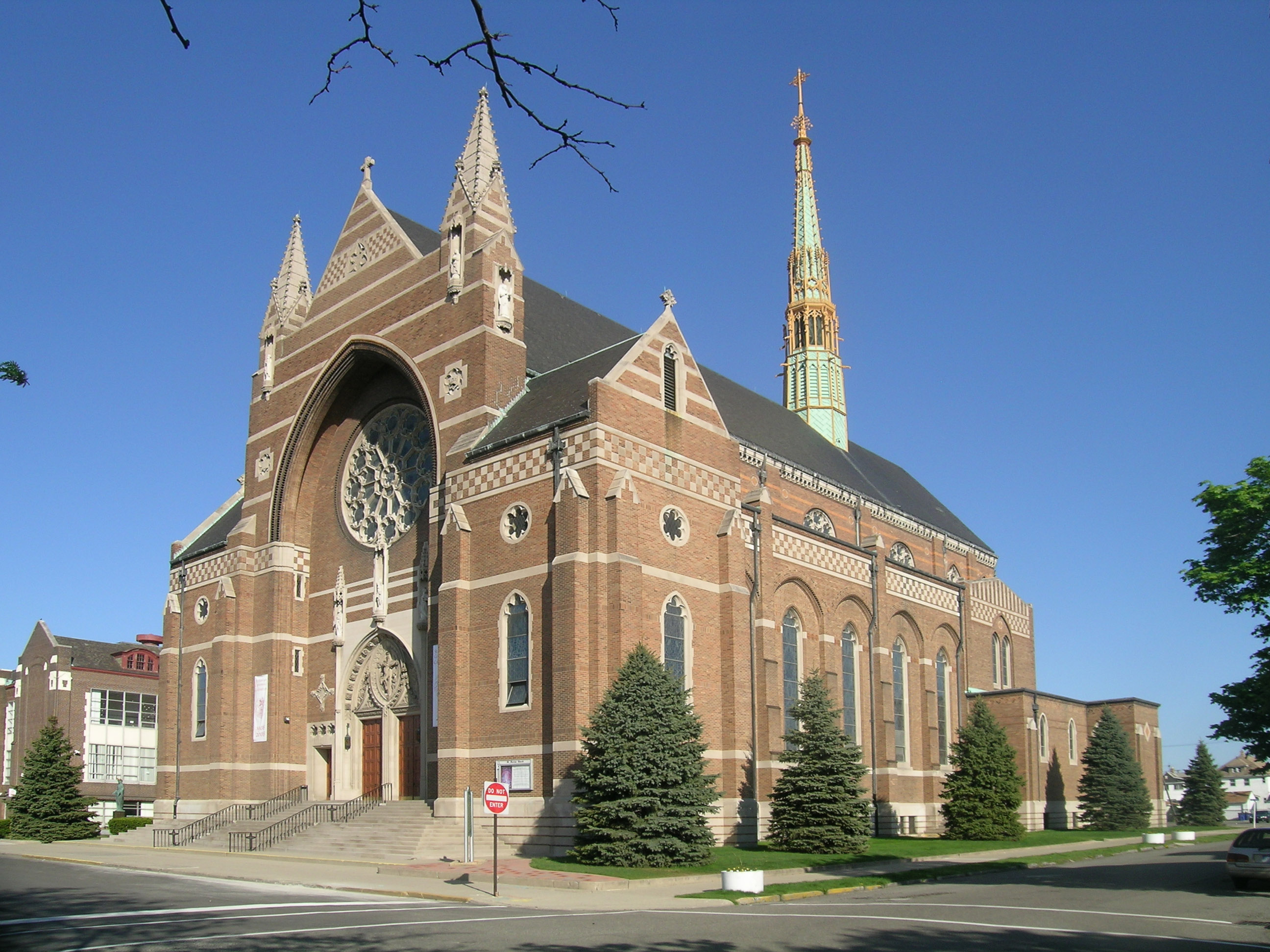
St. Florian Church in Hamtramck

A wave of Polish immigrants arrived in the U.S. post-World War II. Poletown in Detroit began losing its Polish population since the 1940s because of construction projects replacing earlier structures and demographic changes. From the late 1960s to the early 1990s a wave of arrivals consisted of refugees, including those who were members of Solidarity, and non-immigrants who had temporary visas. In 1981 the Central Industrial Park (CIP) project destroyed much of Detroit's Poletown.

By the 21st century, many Detroit and Hamtramck Poles moved to Warren, Sterling Heights, and Troy. Consequently, Troy had become the center for the original Polonia of Detroit and Hamtramck.

== Demographics ==
As of 2014, Macomb County has almost 4,500 immigrants from Poland and Wayne County has 3,300 immigrants from Poland. Those two counties have the highest numbers of Polish immigration in Metro Detroit.

== Politics ==
In the 20th century, Poles were politically divided among Catholic traditionalists, Polish nationalists, and Socialists. The nationalists advocated for independence of Poland while the Catholic church favored working with the existing German, Russian, and Austrian governments. The Polish National Church had four parishes in Detroit. The church, founded by American Poles, used Polish liturgies and was against social conservatism. The Polish Catholic Union, the socialist Polish Mutual Aid Association, and the pro-independent Polish National Alliance were Polish social programs in the area.

In terms of the political parties, Polish people were most aligned with the Democratic Party.

== Institutions ==
The American Polish Cultural Center is in Troy.

== Social groups ==
Historically, the Polish had several associations including the Polish Doctors Association, the Society of Polish Engineers, the Polish Lawyers Association, and the Polish Veterans. The latter group, which had a clubhouse, had 25% of its members born in Poland. The members had enlisted in Haller's Polish Army.

== Socioeconomic status ==
According to Ethnic Communities of Greater Detroit, 1970, Poles were "in terms of their occupation, their education, and their income", the "least successful" immigrant group along with the Italians.

== Education ==
As of 2013, Polish is among the most commonly spoken foreign languages in Hamtramck Public Schools. As of the 2008–2009 school year 2.4% of the district's students had Polish as their primary language.

After Hamtramck became a municipality in 1922, every member of the Hamtramck Board of Education was a Pole and most students of the school system were Polish Catholics. In 1925, of the school district's 7,526 students, about 5,400 were ethnic Polish. Half of the ethnic Polish students were non-US citizens. In a period in the 20th century, 8% of HPS teachers were Polish.

Many Polish residents of Detroit in the decade of 1910 did not send their children to Detroit Public Schools. This was partly due to a curriculum introduced in the decade of 1900 that lacked Polish culture and strongly emphasized English language and literature, and partly due to a 1910 IQ testing-based tracking system that had the potential of denying immigrants access to academic programs. In addition many of the new intermediate schools built around 1910 were not accessible to Polish residents. Ethnic Communities of Greater Detroit (1970) stated that in the 20th century, the "proportion of teachers of Polish descent is not so great in Detroit as in Hamtramck". Of the DPS schools, Northeastern High School during a period in the 20th century had the highest levels of Polish teachers, with some Europe-born ethnic Polish faculty.

In the early 20th century, Hamtramck three parishes established grade schools, St. Florian, Our Lady Queen of Apostles, and St. Ladislaus.

In the 20th century, the Institute of Educational Aid, offering biology, citizenship, English, geography, and mathematics courses to adults, was operated by a Polish organization.

== Media ==
Historically WJLB broadcast Polish-language radio programming.

== Notable people ==
- John Dingell
- John Dingell Sr.
- Bob Keselowski (Rochester)
- Brad Keselowski (Rochester Hills)
- Brian Keselowski (Rochester Hills)
- Ron Keselowski (Troy)
- John Lesinski Sr.
- George Sadowski
- Eddie Slovik (Detroit)
- Norbert Schemansky (Dearborn)

== See also ==
- St. Florian Church (Hamtramck, Michigan)
- Demographics of Metro Detroit
- History of the Hungarian Americans in Metro Detroit
- History of the Italian Americans in Metro Detroit
