= Detroit International Exposition and Fair of 1889 =

1889 exposition near Detroit, Michigan, US

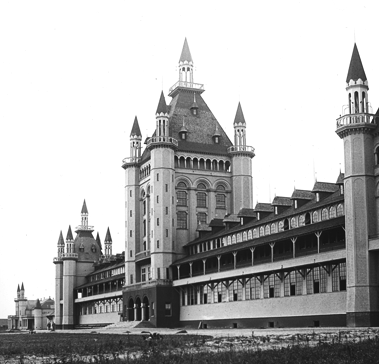
Detroit International Exposition main building in 1889

The Detroit International Exposition and Fair of 1889 debuted on September 17, 1889, in Delray, Michigan, near Detroit. Running as an annual event through 1892, it showcased the industrial and agricultural achievements of the modern city and attracted over 300,000 visitors worldwide.

== Background ==
The fairgrounds were located in Delray, Michigan, an area southwest of Detroit that was later annexed by the city in 1906. It was a grand showcase of Detroit's growing might, spotlighting its convenient transit hubs and booming production of everything from cast-iron stoves to pharmaceuticals. It offered a mix of technological demonstrations, fine art, and horse racing, complemented by international cuisines, an on-site brewery, and a variety of musical and stage acts.

The exposition covered 156 acres (0.6 km^{2}) and featured over 300 structures, including pavilions, livestock stalls, and various dining venues. The Main Exposition Building, designed by Louis Kamper in an eclectic Victorian style, was a palace-like structure that featured a 20-story main tower and boasted 200,000 square feet of exhibition space. At the time, it was the largest building in the world built specifically for fairground purposes. The structures were demolished shortly after the exposition ended, and the grounds were sold in 1895 to the Solvay Process Company for industrial use.
