= Southwest Detroit =

Human settlement in Detroit, Michigan, United States of America

Coordinates: 42°19′N 83°6′W

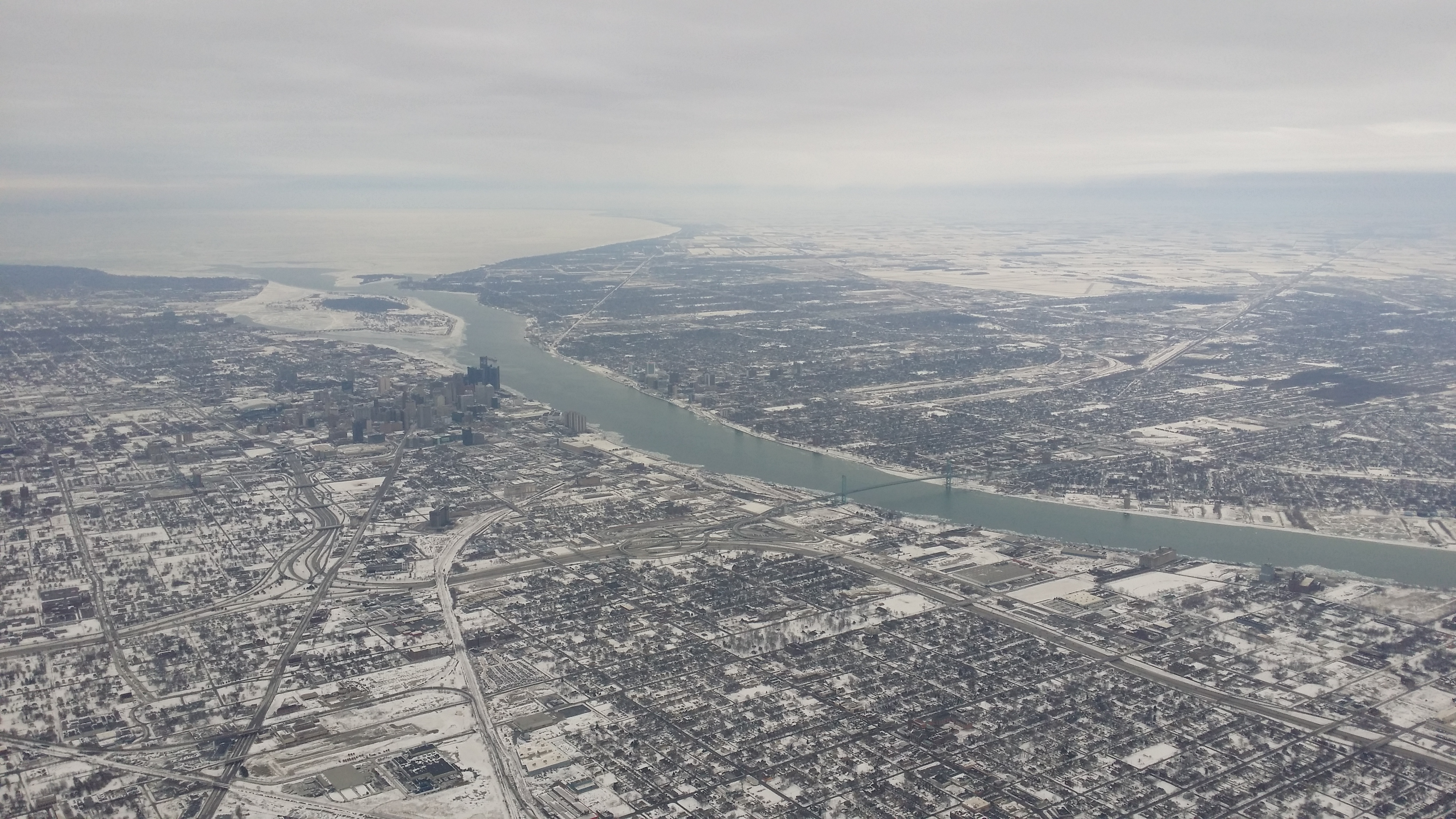
Aerial view of Southwest Detroit

Southwest Detroit is a region within the city of Detroit that includes several historical neighborhoods, including Corktown, Mexicantown, Hubbard Farms, and Delray.

== Neighborhoods ==
Southwest Detroit is well known for Mexicantown, Detroit's vibrant Mexican community. Clark Park is a popular park within the Hubbard Farms neighborhood of southwest Detroit.

== Economy ==
Southwest Detroit has many independent grocery stores. In particular Southwest Detroit has several Hispanic supermarkets, or supermercados, that stock meat, specialty produce, and tortillas.

The Southwest Detroit Business Association serves as an industry organization for businesses from the community.

== Transportation ==
Two international bridges connect the U.S. and Canada via Southwest Detroit and Windsor, Ontario: The Ambassador Bridge and The Gordie Howe International Bridge.

== Education ==
Residents are within Detroit Public Schools and are zoned to Western International High School or Cesar Chavez High school with the added option of attending Detroit Cristo Rey High School, which is a private, Catholic college prep school. Previously Southwestern High School was in Southwest Detroit. Southwestern closed in 2012, and students were reassigned to Western.

The current Munger Elementary-Middle School, which opened in 2012, had a cost of $22.2 million.
