= Holy Cross Hungarian Roman Catholic Church =

Church building in Detroit, United States of America

Coordinates: 42.29368°N 83.11924°W

The Holy Cross Hungarian Roman Catholic Church is a Catholic church located in the Delray section of Detroit, Michigan, within the Archdiocese of Detroit.

== History ==
In the decade of 1900 there were plans to establish a Catholic church, but by 1905 the Hungarians had difficulty agreeing on a final site. Later that year the Holy Cross Hungarian Church, a Hungarian Catholic church, opened in Delray. In 1906 the first church building, a frame building, was established. As the number of Hungarians in Delray increased, a new church of the Holy Cross Hungarian Catholic Church opened in 1925. The cornerstone was laid on November 26, 1924.

The construction of Interstate 75 in the mid-1960s destroyed large parts of Delray and divided the community into two pieces. The Hungarian community declined and the Holy Cross parish school closed.

The Holy Cross Hungarian Church was scheduled to observe its 75th anniversary on September 17, 2000. By August of that year, renovations and polishing were underway.

== Architecture ==
The brick church building has twin towers. Hungarian-born Henri Kohner was the architect and builder of the current church. Detroit Stained Glass Works designed and created the church's five Renaissance-style heavy enamel-painted sanctuary windows. The windows portray Jesus Christ, Saint Peter, Paul the Apostle, and several Hungarian saints. They were installed in 1924. The company von Gerichten Studio of Columbus, Ohio paid $12,000 to have the stained windows made. Ludwig von Gerichten designed and created the church's stained glass windows. Among them is a pot-metal and painted enamel glass window titled "The Assumption of the Virgin." Andras Daubner made several large hand-painted murals that were made between 1948 and 1949.

== See also ==
- History of the Hungarian Americans in Metro Detroit
