= Southwestern High School (Michigan) =

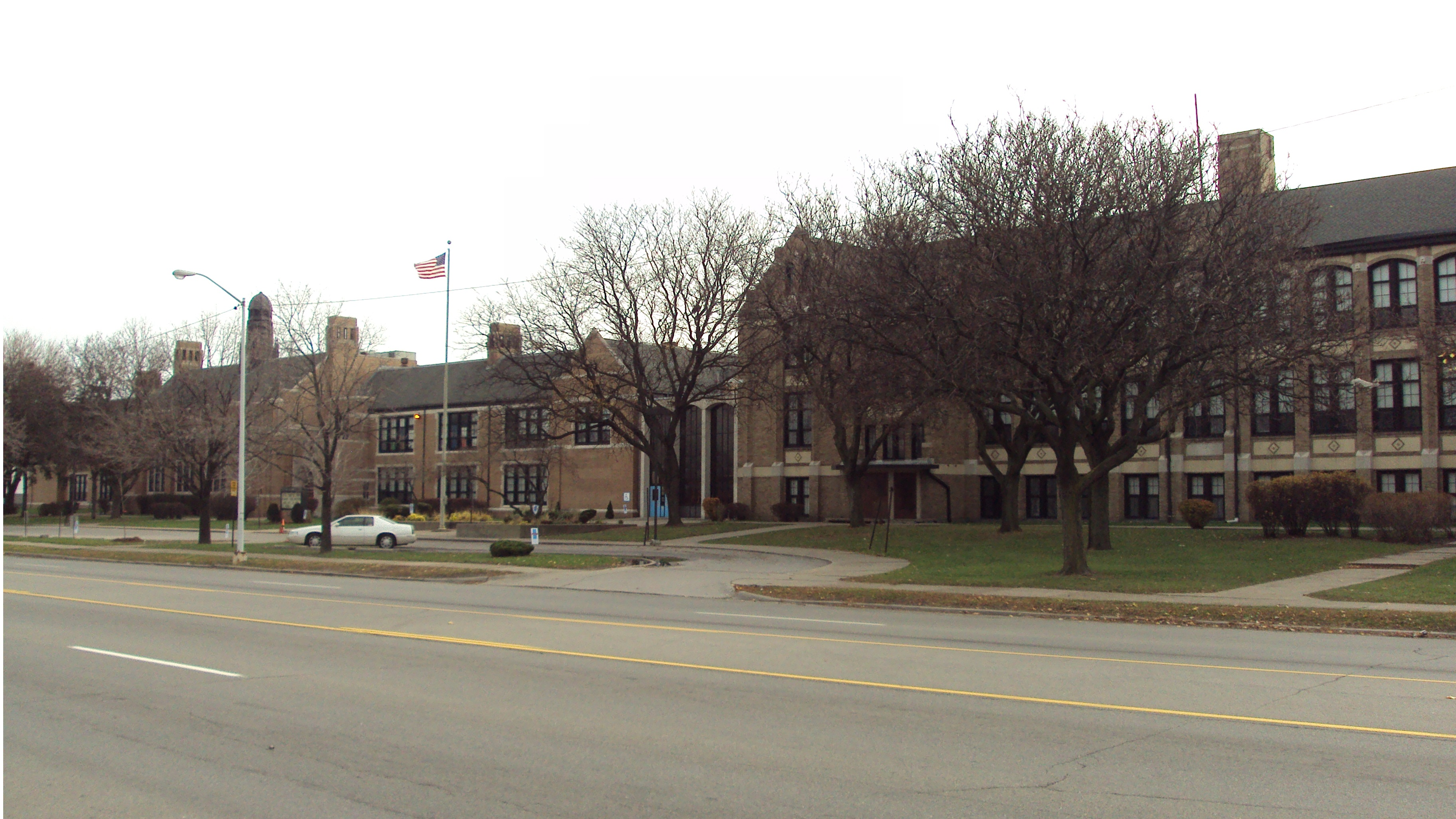

Location
- 6921 W. Fort Street; Detroit, Michigan; United States; 42°18′11″N 83°06′31″W

Information
- Type: Public secondary
- Status: Demolished
- Closed: 2012
- School district: Detroit Public Schools
- Grades: 9-12
- Mascot: Prospectors
- Demolished: 2023
- Website: detroitk12.org/schools/school/584/

Southwestern High School was a high school in Southwest Detroit, Michigan. It was part of the Detroit Public Schools district. The school's area, Southwest Detroit, has the majority of Detroit's Latino population. The school was located in a three-story building. It closed in 2012.

The school served Boynton–Oakwood Heights, Delray, and Springwells from September 1916 until June 2012.

== History ==
Southwestern was designed with a gymnasium, swimming pool, extensive track and field space, and an auditorium. It was one of the first schools developed following Michigan's enactment of statutes requiring mandatory attendance at high school. The students of adjoining Nordstrum attended the dedication of Southwestern in April 1922, and began using the building immediately, although the first regular classes began in September 1922. The January 1923 yearbook was called the Sou'wester. Its initial student body was heavily Hungarian American.

The growth in Detroit's student population was so rapid, Nordstrom simply became a wing of Southwestern used mainly by ninth and tenth grade students, with the most advanced classes held in the newer building.

In a period prior to 1955, Southwestern was one of the schools serving high school students from the Allen Park School District. That year, Allen Park High School in Allen Park opened.

When integration busing came in 1970, with 350 White American students newly assigned to Southwestern High, student discipline declined. In 1979 the principal died after being hit by a bullet off-campus. By 1982 Joe Greene, who was now principal, instituted a new school discipline program. That year the student body at that time was described as "melting-pot" by Glen Macnow of Detroit Free Press.

In the 1980s Guam-born Manny Crisostomo, working for the Detroit Free Press, received permission from the DPS superintendent to photograph the inside of the school, including the students. He took photographs for 40 weeks, and based on these photographs he won the 1989 Pulitzer Prize Feature Photography Award.

Chadsey High School closed in 2009 and its neighborhoods became part of the Southwestern zone. Population decline continued in Detroit, and specifically in the quantity of schoolchildren in neighborhoods served by Southwestern High School. For several years the district considered closing Southwestern. Robert Bobb, who served as the Detroit Public Schools emergency manager, had almost closed Southwestern. By February 2012 the school district announced that it had plans to close Southwestern at the end of the school year. Several protesters challenged the school closing proposal. Aaron Foley of MLive said that the protesters were concerned about a loss of bilingual education employees and fears of a rivalry with students at Western International High School. The school closed in June 2012. Its neighborhoods were apportioned between Northwestern High School and Western International for summer school and the start of the fall semester in September 2012. The school's contents were auctioned using the internet in October 2012. DPS officials said that making the sale online would save $85,000 of school funds.

By 2014 scrappers and vandals had attacked the closed Southwestern campus.

== Saving the school ==
Throughout Southwestern's abandonment, there had been many attempts to save the school. In 2012, Southwestern Community Village, a neighborhood group, announced that they had plans to save the school, however a fire in 2013 dealt a big setback to their plans. Southwestern Community Village, not trying to deal with the deterioration that had occurred as a result of the fire, decided to drop the plans. The school would continue to be destroyed by scrappers in the following years. In 2015, despite the heavy damage that had already occurred, auto-supplier group Sakthi Automotive, whose office building was situated right next to Southwestern High School across Waterman street, purchased Southwestern and announced that they would be renovating the school and converting it into a training center for the nearby factories. Soon after their purchase, Sakthi Automotive began tearing away the track field behind Southwestern High School, making way for the construction of a large facility. Construction was completed, although some of the track field still remained before also being removed sometime after. Sakthi Automotive also installed boards over the windows of the school, which, from a distance, looked like real windows. This was to make the school appear more aesthetically pleasing. Unfortunately, this is all Sakthi Automotive would do, and despite the boards over the windows, scrappers still flooded into the school, further tearing it apart. Several years would pass, and Sakthi Automotive would not do anything for the school. In September 2020, real estate owner Dan Gilbert purchased the Southwestern High School site from Sakthi Automotive for $38.5 million. He did not announce what he would do with the school, and it remained abandoned.

== Scrapping ==
Just a few years after Southwestern High School's closure, it was completely gutted. Scrappers smashed all of the windows, exposing the school's ghostly interior to those who drove by. Scrappers ripped all valuable metal from the interior of the school, including pipes and wiring. Detroit Public Schools (DPS) Police were called to the abandoned school almost daily in order to stop scrappers from further stripping the school. The school quickly became an eyesore to the neighborhood that surrounded it. On March 3, 2013, a trespasser deliberately set a fire in the school's cafeteria, which damaged several nearby rooms within the newer wing.

== Demolition ==
In January 2023, Southwestern High School began demolition after sitting vacant for over a decade. By February 10, the school was completely gone.

== Redevelopment ==
In December 2024, it was announced that Luxwall, an Ypsilanti-based glass solutions company would construct a 276,000 square foot facility on the former land of Southwestern High School, which is owned by Dan Gilbert and Bedrock. Back in November 2023, LuxWall received a $31.7 million grant from the U.S. Department of Energy to aid in the project. Luxwall stated that 277 new jobs would be offered for the area once the facility opened. in June 2025, construction officially began on the facility, and is currently still under construction as of September 2025 and can be seen from the I-75 freeway. The facility is expected to be completed in the summer of 2026.

== Campus ==
The campus has 245,000 square feet (22,800 m^{2}) of space. In 2002 a replacement pool was built for $1.25 million.

== Curriculum ==
As of 2000 the school offered training programs in business-oriented technical skills and by that year it included a computer-assisted design computer center. Students were able to take internship and work and school cooperative programs. In 2000 the school did not offer skilled manufacturing and trade courses. These courses were offered at five different technical centers in Detroit, and interested students would arrive to their regular school early and board buses bound for a technical center. That year the technical schools had limited numbers of recruitment information available in Spanish, the primary language of many students at Southwestern.

== Notable alumni ==
- Ben Carson, physician and politician
- Martha Farkas Glaser, Civil Rights Activist and Manager of Jazz Musician Erroll Garner
- Rashida Talib, member of the US House of Representatives
- former NFL player Dale Hansen
- former MLB player Stan Lopata
- former MLB player Barney McCosky
- former Basketball player, Journalist, and Author Tom "Tatos" Mooradian
- former MLB player Merv Rettenmund
- former NFL player Luis Sharpe
- former MLB player Mike Tresh
- Former 1990 Final Four MOP Anderson Hunt (UNLV)
- Former Detroit Mercy basketball head coach Bacari Alexander
- Former NBA basketball player Tony Robertson
- Former NBA basketball player Voshon Lenard
- Former NBA basketball player Howard Eisley
- Former NBA basketball player Jalen Rose
- Basketball head coach and former professional player Antoine Joubert
