= Delray, Detroit =

Delray
- Neighborhood of Detroit
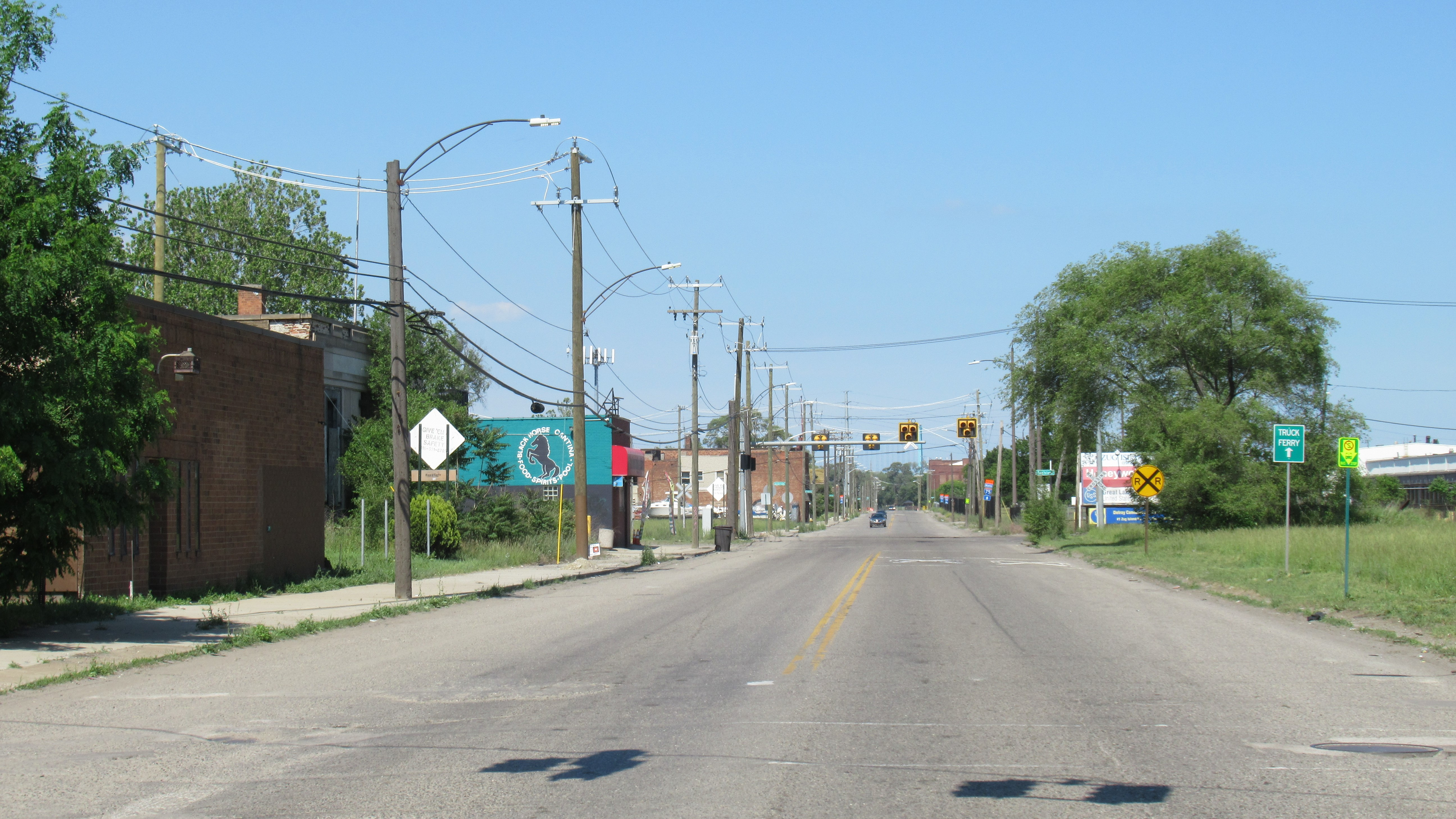
- Looking north along W. Jefferson Avenue in 2021

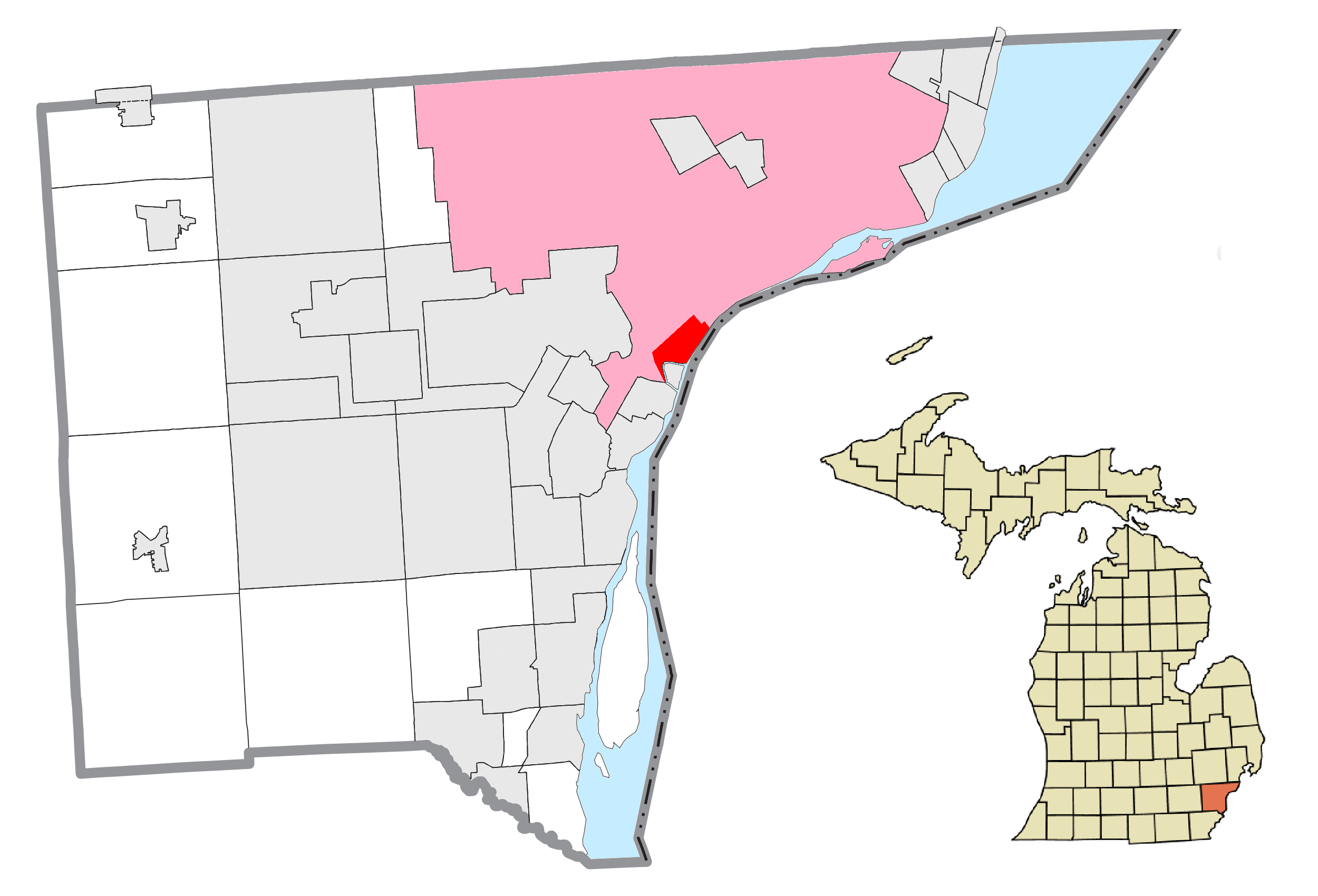
- Location of Delray (red) within the city of Detroit (pink) in Wayne County

- Location within the state of Michigan Location within the United States
- Coordinates: 42°17′45″N 83°07′00″W
- Country: United States
- State: Michigan
- County: Wayne
- City: Detroit
- Platted: 1836
- Incorporated: 1897 (village)
- Annexed by Detroit: 1906

Area
  - Land: 2.938 sq mi (7.61 km^{2})
- Elevation: 591 ft (180 m)

Population (2010)
  - Total: 2,783
  - Density: 947.2/sq mi (365.7/km^{2})
- Time zone: UTC-5 (EST)
  - Summer (DST): UTC-4 (EDT)
- ZIP code(s): 48209 (Detroit)
- Area code: 313
- GNIS feature ID: 1617006

Delray is a neighborhood in southwest Detroit in the U.S. state of Michigan. Its area extends south to the River Rouge, east to the Detroit River, west to Fort Street, and north to Clark Street. The two census tracts that cover the neighborhood had a population of 2,783 at the 2010 census.

Delray was platted in 1836. Initially a rural area, heavy industry arrived in the 1890s, beginning a prosperous era leading to Delray incorporating as a village in 1897. Delray's population swelled, fueled largely by immigrants from Eastern Europe, and the village's 7 square miles (18 km^{2}) were annexed into the city of Detroit in 1906. By 1930, Delray peaked at approximately 24,000 residents, but the population has dropped precipitously since World War II due to increased industrialization, pollution, and urban decay. By the late 1960s, the city's master plan for Delray was to transition it to a purely industrial area. In 2007, the Detroit Metro Times described Delray as "the closest thing to a ghost town within a city."

In 2013, Delray was selected for the location of the upcoming Gordie Howe International Bridge. Connecting Detroit to Windsor, Ontario across the border, the bridge was inaugurated in July 2026.

== Geography ==
Though Delray has no official boundaries, the Detroit Free Press defines Delray's limits as the River Rouge on the south, east to the Detroit River, west to Fort Street, and north to Clark Street. It is the second most southerly neighborhood in Detroit, lying just northeast of Boynton–Oakwood Heights. Delray is roughly conterminous with two Census Bureau tracts that cover 2.938 square miles (7.61 km^{2}). The city of River Rouge, including Zug Island, borders Delray to the southwest, and is connected to Detroit by the West Jefferson Avenue–Rouge River Bridge.

The major thoroughfares through Delray are West Fort Street, Interstate 75, and West Jefferson Avenue. In 1935, Delray formed the southern portion of Wards 14, 16, 18, and 20. Since 2013, the neighborhood has been part of District 6.

== History ==
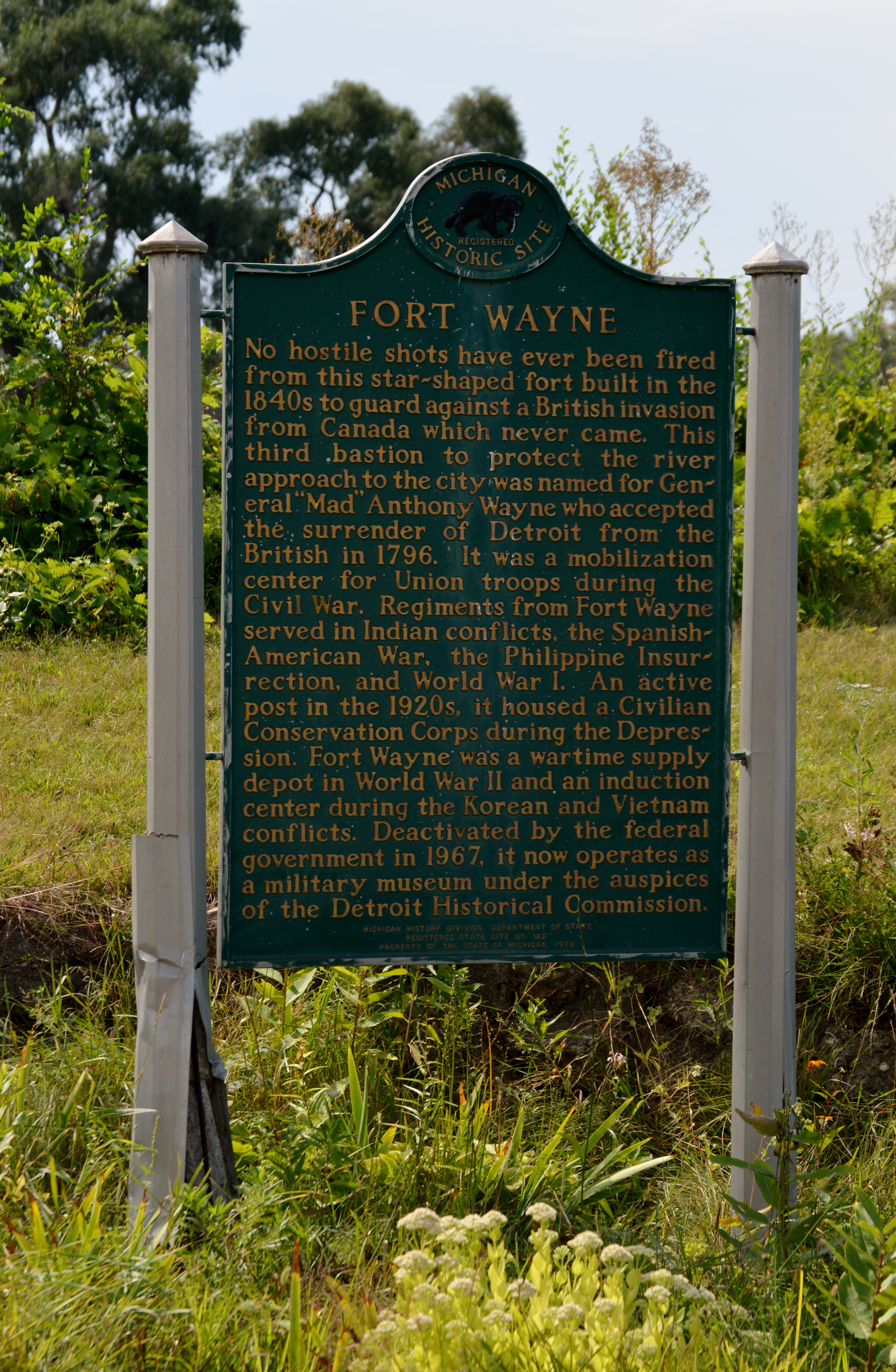
Fort Wayne historical marker

The area that would become Delray was first platted as Belgrade in 1836. Most of the settlement lay in Springwells Township, with the rest across the River Rouge in Ecorse Township. Fort Wayne was built in 1843 on the Detroit River at the foot of what is now Livernois Avenue to protect against a potential British attack from Canada. The area was renamed "Del Rey" on October 14, 1851, at the suggestion of resident Augustus D. Burdeno, a Mexican–American War veteran who had encountered a village named Molino del Rey ("King's Mill") while serving in Mexico. The settlement, by then anglicised to "Delray," received its own post office on February 8, 1870, which remained opened until 1970.

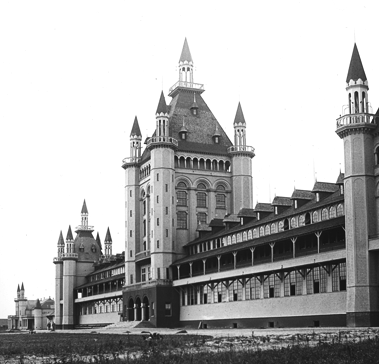
The Main Exposition building of the Detroit International Exposition and Fair of 1889

In 1889, Delray was the site of the Detroit International Exposition and Fair, a combined industrial expo and agricultural fair designed to show off the rising economic prominence of Detroit, whose population of 206,000 made it the nation's 15th largest city. The expo's main building, located on the riverfront west of Fort Wayne, was designed by architect Louis Kamper, and featured 200,000 square feet (19,000 m^{2}) of exhibition space. The fair was a resounding success, drawing 300,000 attendees, which prompted officials to make the expo an annual affair, but declining attendance ended the event by 1894.

In 1895, Delray's era of heavy industry began when the Solvay Process Company, drawn by the area's underground salt deposits, cleared the Detroit International Exposition site and opened a chemical plant to manufacture soda ash. More heavy industry followed, including the Michigan Malleable Iron Company, the Michigan Carbon Company, a Detroit Edison power plant, and the Detroit Iron & Steel Company, whose blast furnaces on Zug Island were just across the River Rouge from Delray. Despite the economic uptick, Delray's 15,000 inhabitants still lacked serviceable water, sewage, fire, and lighting infrastructure, and sought civic improvements via either incorporation or annexation by Detroit. On October 26, 1897, the Wayne County Board of Supervisors authorized the incorporation of Delray as a village by a vote of 25–19.

By 1900, Delray had become a magnet of immigration from Eastern Europe, drawn by the village's job opportunities. Hungarian immigrants predominated, so much so that by 1911, the Detroit Free Press estimated their population as 5,000 and referred to Delray as a Hungarian colony. Newspapers frequently reported on Hungarian immigrants living in overcrowded rooming houses, engaging in crime, and frequenting Delray's saloons, which numbered 33 at the turn of the century.

Detroit formally annexed Delray on April 1, 1906, along with the adjacent village of Woodmere and a portion of Springwells Township, forming Detroit's 18th Ward and increasing the city's population by 20,000. Detroit immediately sought to improve the newly acquired area's infrastructure; for example, Delray had only one paved street, River Road (quickly renamed West Jefferson Avenue), Woodmere had no sewage system, and the former Springwells Township tract lacked street lighting.

In the 1920s, Delray's industrial base continued to grow. In 1922, Fisher opened an auto body factory at the southwest corner of Fort Street and West End Street. Directly east, the Detroit Union Produce Terminal opened in 1929, serving as a food distribution center which spread over 40 acres (0.16 km^{2}) and had 10 miles (16 km) of railroad track. Two miles west of Delray, Ford completed its River Rouge Plant in 1928, which employed 85,000 workers at its peak.

By 1930, Delray's population peaked at an estimated 24,000 residents. A wastewater plant opened in Delray in 1940, leading to the destruction of 600 housing units, the neighborhood's first large-scale residential demolition. By 1940, Delray's population dropped to 20,000. After World War II, many residents moved to the suburbs, following the broader trend in both Detroit and the nation. By 1950, Delray's population dropped to 17,000. In 1957 and 1974, further expansion of the water treatment plant demolished all of the neighborhood's houses south of Copland Street and west of Dearborn Street, and the construction of Interstate 75 destroyed even more still.

By the late 1960s, Delray was suffering from population loss, urban decay, and heavy pollution. The Detroit Free Press wrote that Delray's "air is so bad it is hard to tell at any moment just where it comes from." With the neighborhood's future looking grim, the Detroit City Planning Commission adopted the plan that Delray's future was to be purely industrial, spurring outrage from longtime residents. In 1975, residents staged a mock funeral for Delray—reported then as "dilapidated and dying"—to draw the city's attention to the pollution and crime, but the neighborhood's downward spiral continued. Using data from the 1980 census, the Detroit Free Press calculated that Delray had the highest rates of serious crime, malicious destruction of property, and residential fires of Detroit's 51 subcommunities, as well as the lowest percentage of residents to have attended college. The General Motors Fleetwood body plant closed in 1987, eliminating more than 3,000 jobs.

According to the 2000 census, just 3,100 people remained in Delray. The Great Recession further shuttered many of the few non-industrial businesses remaining in Delray, and forced U.S. Steel, a major employer operating on Zug Island, to impose crippling layoffs. Despite the population loss, journalist John Carlisle wrote in a 2009 that "a foul stench" was still present in Delray due to the wastewater plant and the industry still operating.

In 2013, Delray was chosen as the site of the Gordie Howe International Bridge, which will provide a second Detroit River crossing for trade between the United States and Canada. Construction has resulted in large-scale demolition of houses and streets that lie in the footprint of the bridge. The city's Bridging Neighborhoods Home Swap program allows Delray residents in the affected area to relocate to new houses in the city. In 2021, as demolition and construction continued, the U.S. and Canadian governments declared the completion of the bridge "a top infrastructure project" for both nations.

=== Hungarian population ===
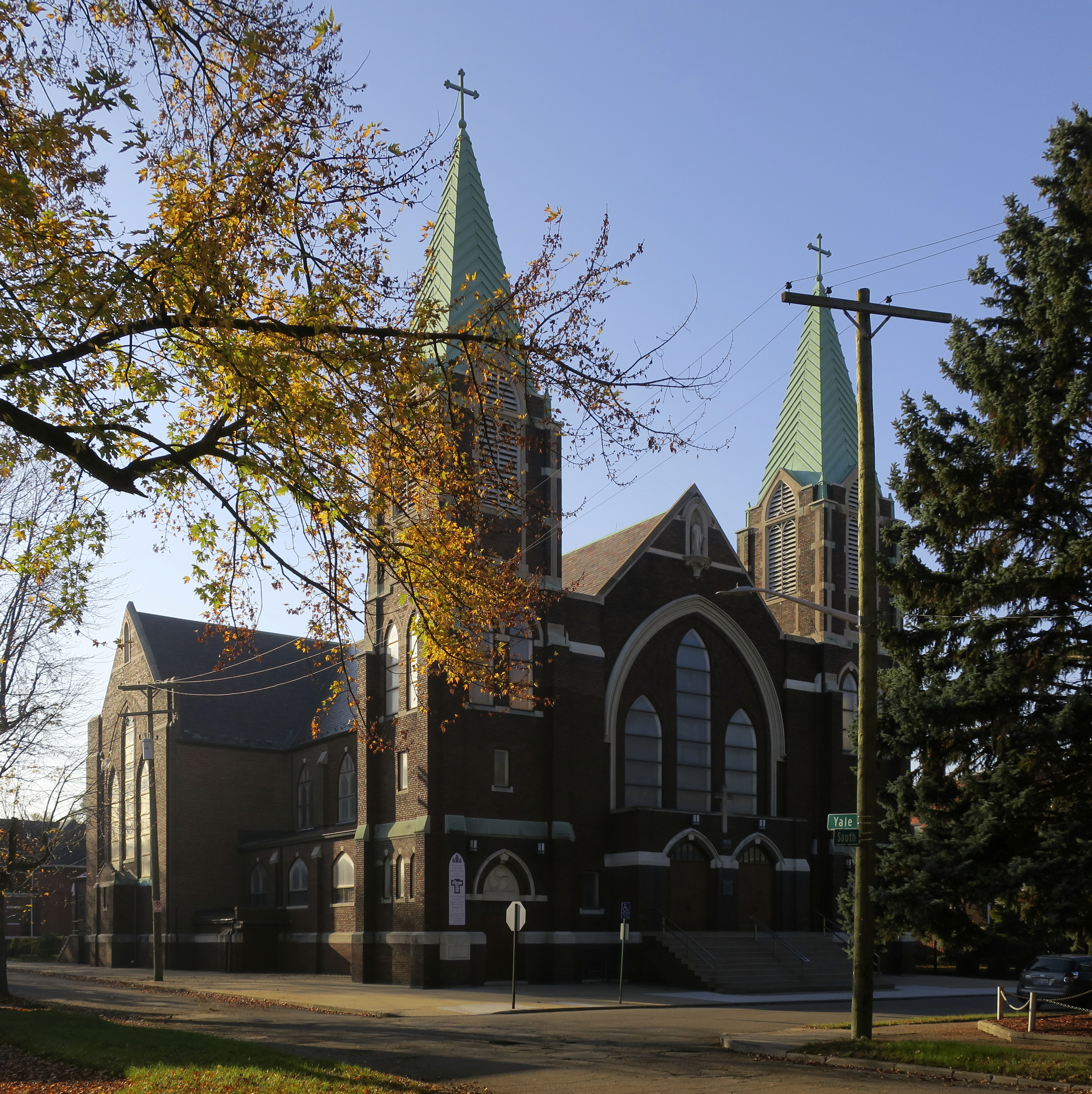
Holy Cross Hungarian Catholic Church in 2022

In the early 20th Century the Delray-Springwells area served as the "Little Hungary" of Detroit and Michigan's Hungarian culture was centered in that community.

In 1898, the Michigan Malleable Iron Company began operations in Delray. Hungarian immigrants moved to Delray from cities including Cleveland, Ohio; South Bend, Indiana; and Toledo, Ohio, in order to get better working conditions and better wages. The first wave of Hungarian refugees came to the U.S. in order to escape the Austro-Hungarian Empire's political issues.

In 1904, a society to establish a Hungarian Lutheran church had about 60 members, There were also plans to establish a Catholic church, but by 1905 the Hungarians had difficulty agreeing on a final site. Later that year the Holy Cross Hungarian Church, a Hungarian Catholic church, opened in Delray. By 1911, about 5,000 Hungarians lived in Delray. In 1906, the Hungarian population began resisting the actions of the town police. In 1907, some Hungarians in Delray and Wyandotte who feared a lack of work returned to Hungary.

After World War I a second wave of Hungarian refugees arrived, who emigrated due to religious and political reasons. Hungary had been reduced in size so many Magyars were escaping discrimination, intimidation and deprivation in the conquered lands of the former enemies of Hungary, often because of the roles they had played in the war. They selected Detroit because the automobile plants paid high wages. As the number of Hungarians in Delray increased, a new church of the Holy Cross Hungarian Catholic Church opened in 1925.

In 1935, Doanne Erdmann Beynon, author of "Crime and Custom of the Hungarians of Detroit," wrote that "it may be assumed" that the Hungarian colony is within an area that extends from Fort Street to the Detroit River and from Clark Street to the Rouge River. He stated that even though the former Delray municipality had "definite" boundaries the boundary of the "Hungarian colony of Delray" was "zonal" and that the lines "fade off indeterminately into areas that do not belong to the colony." He wrote that within this colony, immigrants from all parts of Hungary lived next to each other and did not settle in different areas according to their places of origin. The exception was an area on Barnes and Medina Streets called "Magyar Negyed" where the immigrants mainly originated from Sarud in Heves County. Beynon wrote that the residents preserved "the peculiar customs and, to some extent, the costumes of the home village."

Beynon wrote that in Delray the individual village cultures in Hungary were mixed into a new pan-Hungarian way of life in Delray. During the time Hungarians inhabited Delray, a common phrase was "Within Delray the village life flows on" (Hungarian: Delray-ben foly a falusi élet). Various Hungarian social clubs including athletic, altar, dramatic, sick benefit and insurance, singing (Dalárdák), and social clubs were formed. Each club included a membership and a wider group of adherents or pártolók. Beynon wrote that "Practically every Hungarian of Detroit who has not broken away entirely from the people of his own nationality is connected in some way with one or more of these societies or clubs." As of 1935 many Hungarians in Delray had been socially isolated to the community and persons who had lived 15 to 20 years in Detroit had never visited the city center. Kossuth Day was celebrated in Delray.

Beynon argued that due to Delray's fragmentation among many different wards it was "not possible to determine from the population statistics published by the Bureau of the Census either the number of Hungarians resident within the colony or the population which these form of the total Hungarian population of Detroit." Using the Detroit Board of Education's Detroit City Census, Beynon concluded that in 1925, 45.46% of Detroit's Hungarian population lived in Delray. Using a list of Hungarian surnames in the Detroit City Directory published by the company Polk, Beynon concluded that 44.27% of the Hungarians lived in the Delray colony and 55.72% lived outside of the Delray colony.

During the Great Depression the Daughters of Divine Charity served in a Hungarian-operated orphanage on South Street.

From January 1, 1927, to March 11, 1932, the Wayne County Juvenile Court received 462 complaints filed against Hungarian boys, with a total of 380 boys involved. Of those boys, 140 were from the Delray Hungarian colony.

One wave of Hungarians arrived after the end of World War II. Another wave of Hungarians escaped the Hungarian Revolution of 1956, causing more to arrive in Delray. The construction of Interstate 75 in the mid-1960s destroyed large parts of Delray and divided the community into two pieces. Middle and working class Hungarians moved to Allen Park, Lincoln Park, Melvindale, and Riverview. The Holy Cross parish school closed.

The Holy Cross Hungarian Church was scheduled to observe its 75th anniversary on September 17, 2000. By August of that year, renovations and polishing were underway.

== Education ==
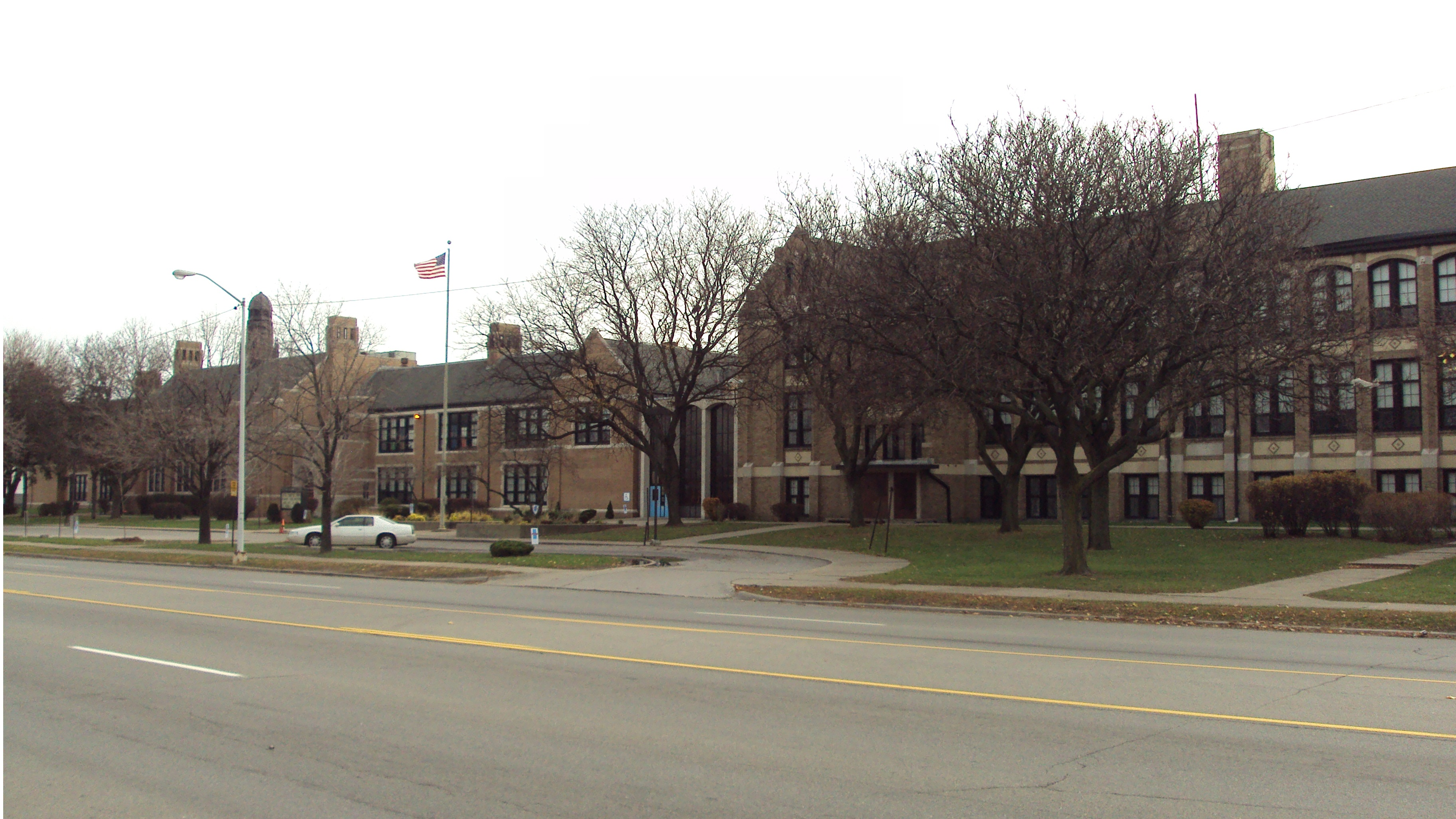
The former Southwestern High School on West Fort Street in Delray (demolished in 2023)

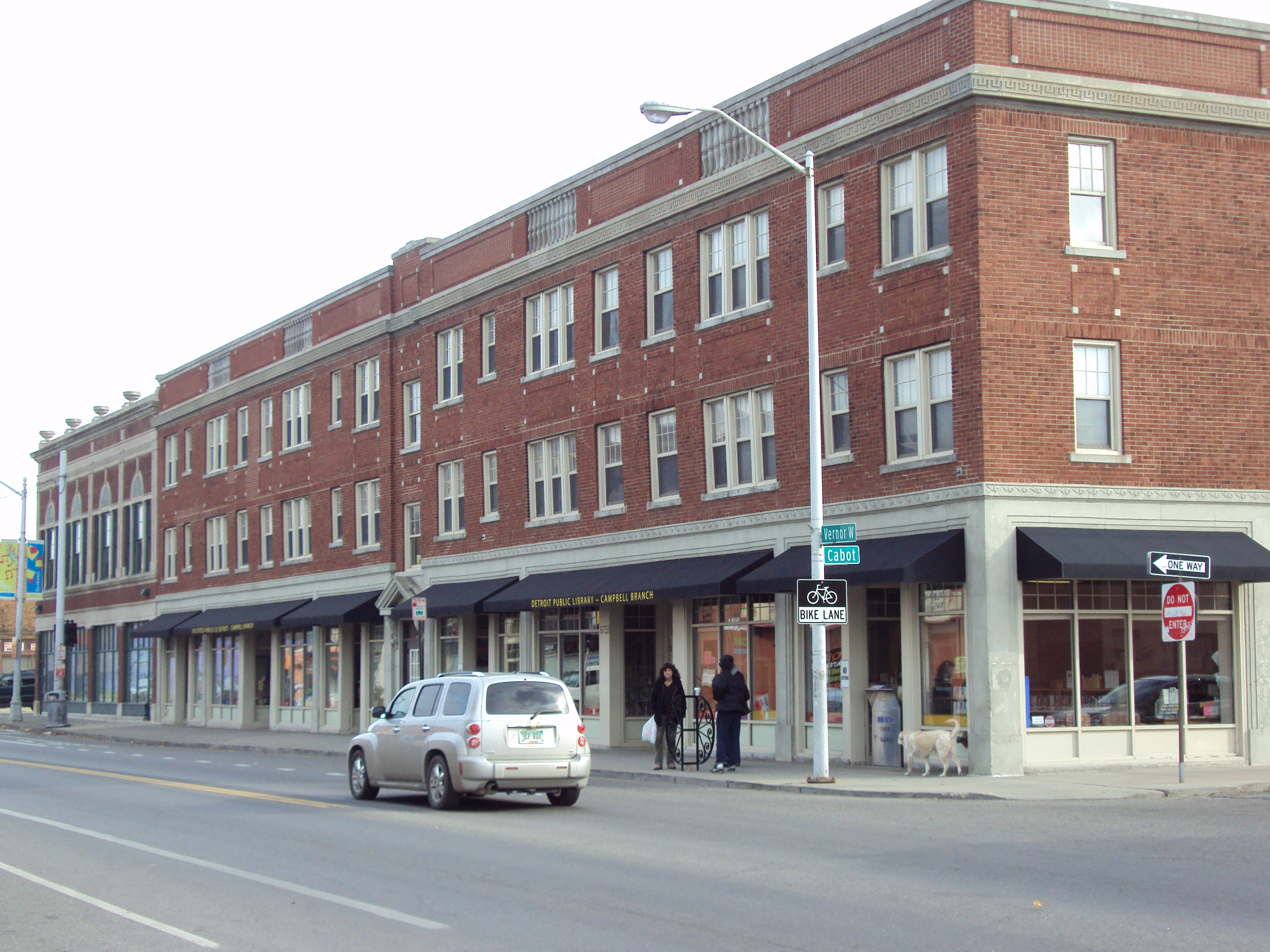
Campbell Branch Library, the closest library branch

=== Public schools ===
Residents of Delray are zoned to Detroit Public Schools (DPS). Clemente Elementary serves Delray for elementary school. All residents are zoned to Western International High School.

==== Histories of public schools ====
From 1894 to 1999, James McMillan School was located on West End Street in central Delray. Originally opened as an elementary school, it was absorbed into DPS in 1907. It was converted into a high school but back into an elementary school for the district in 1916. McMillan Elementary School operated until the end of the 1999 school year, when DPS shut down the school. After it was closed, it remained unused with no intentions of being reopened. It subsequently became heavily vandalized and polluted, suffering a number of fires and eventually a gas line explosion, until the building itself was torn down in 2009. The neighborhood is home also to the now-abandoned Cary Elementary School.

Students at the elementary level (grades preK-5) previously attended Roberto Clemente Elementary or Phoenix Elementary. Students in grades 6–8 attended Mark Twain Elementary School or Earhart Middle School. High school students attended Southwestern High School or Western International High School. At 6921 West Fort Street, Southwestern High School can be considered part of the Delray neighborhood, although most properties along this stretch of Fort Street are not normally included as part of the Delray neighborhood.

=== Public libraries ===
In September 1907, Branch 8 of the Detroit Public Library system opened as the Delray Branch on West End Avenue. In January 1922, the branch was replaced with the James Valentine Campbell Branch on M-85 (West Fort Street). The branch operated until its closure in December 1996. In July 1999, the Campbell Annex Branch opened at the Holy Redeemer Cultural Center and closed in August 2004, only to reopen as the Campbell Branch at Lawndale Station. The neighborhood currently contains no libraries but is closest served by the Campbell Branch Library. It is located outside of the neighborhood at 8733 West Vernor in the Springwells neighborhood.

== Gallery ==
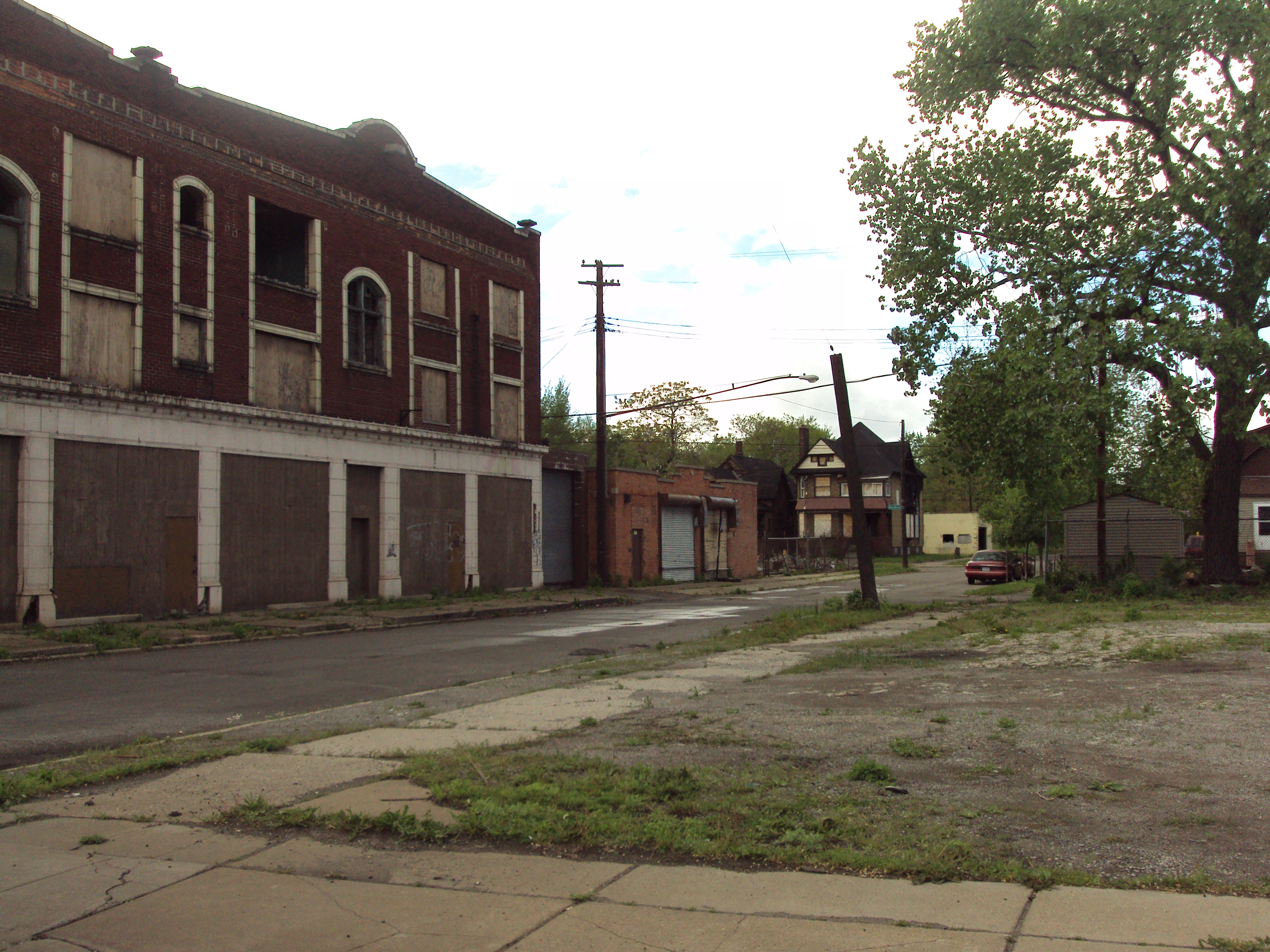
Delray in May 2010

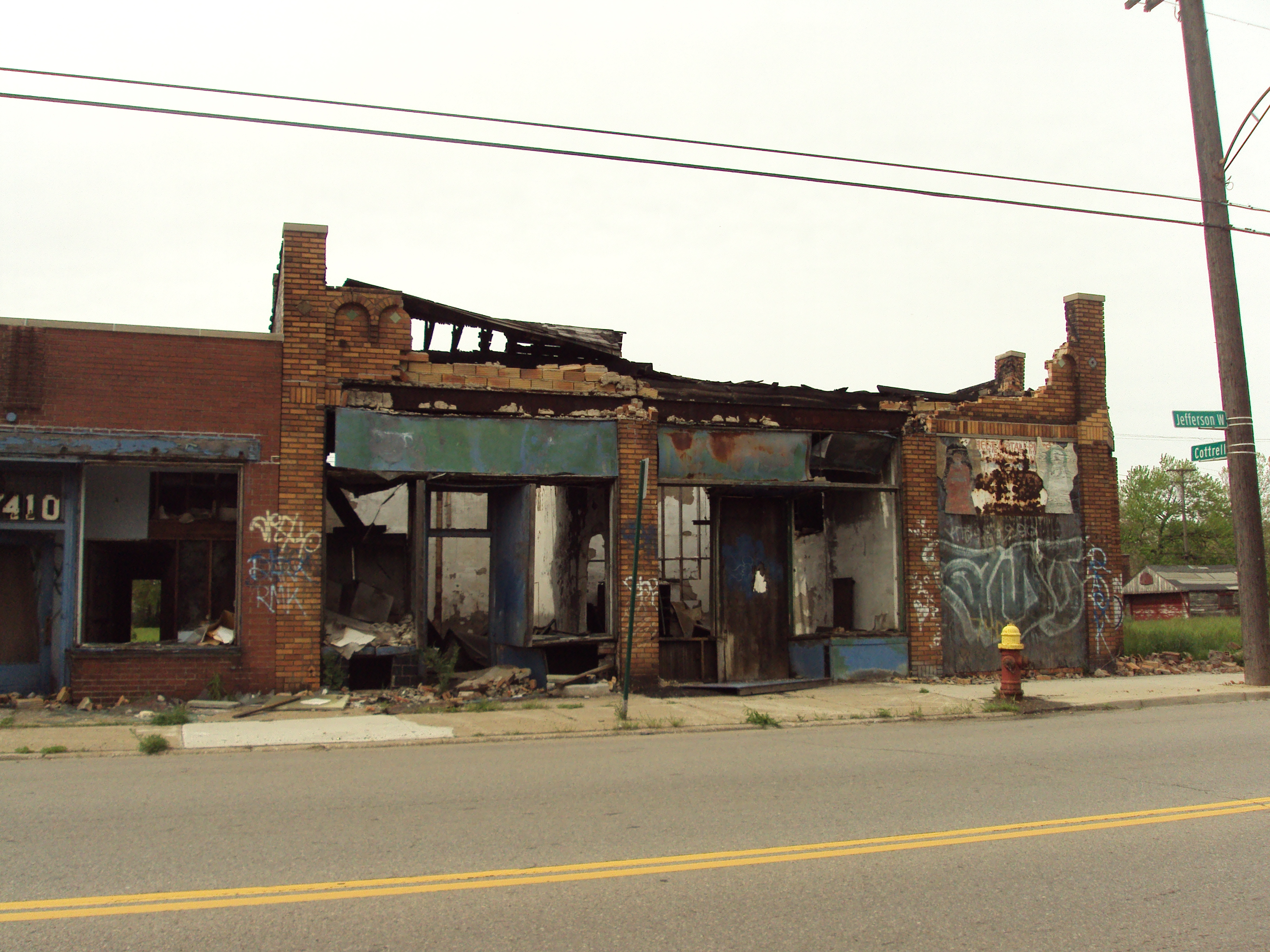
Delray in May 2010

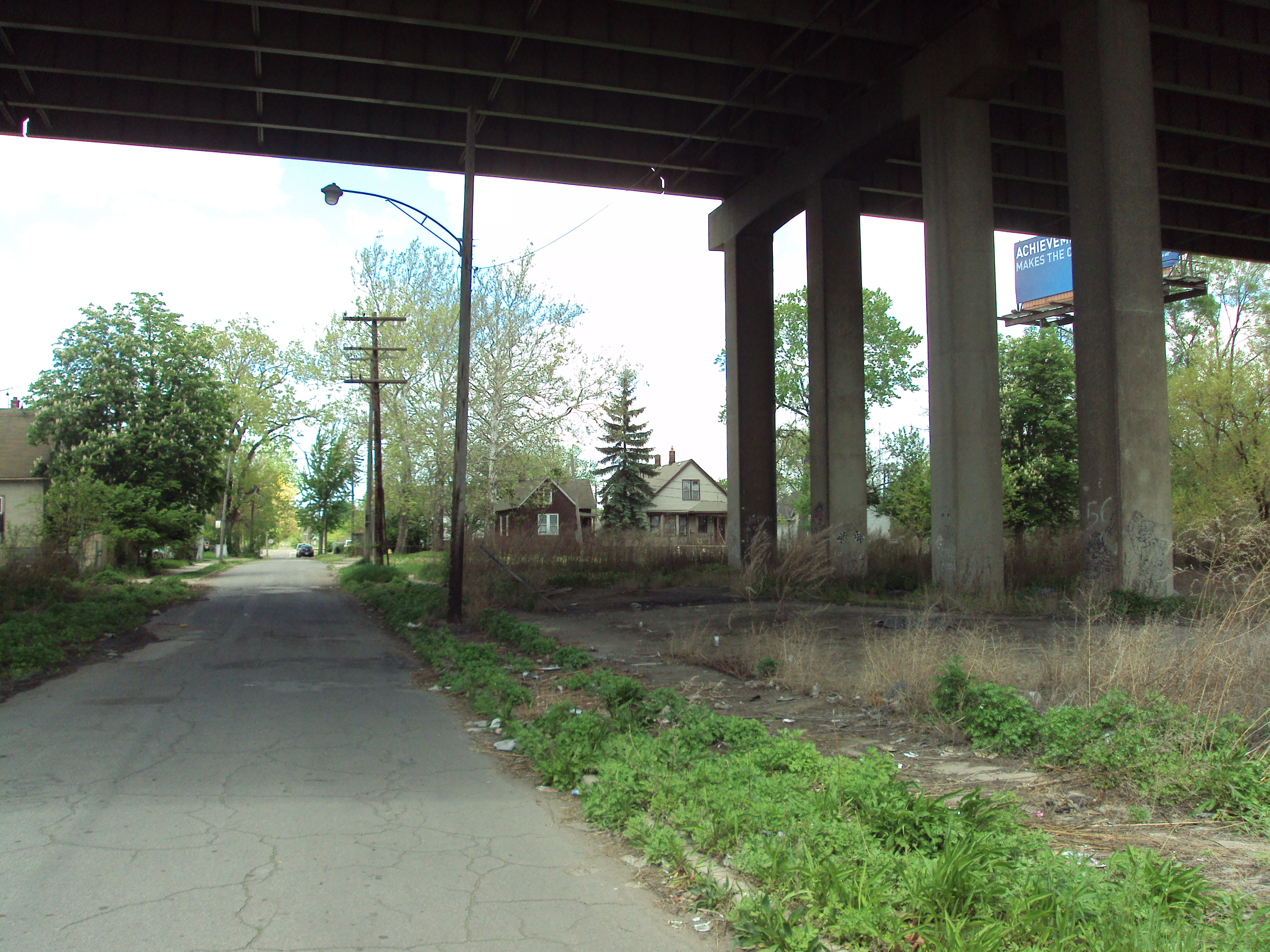
Interstate 75 was built over several blocks of Delray.

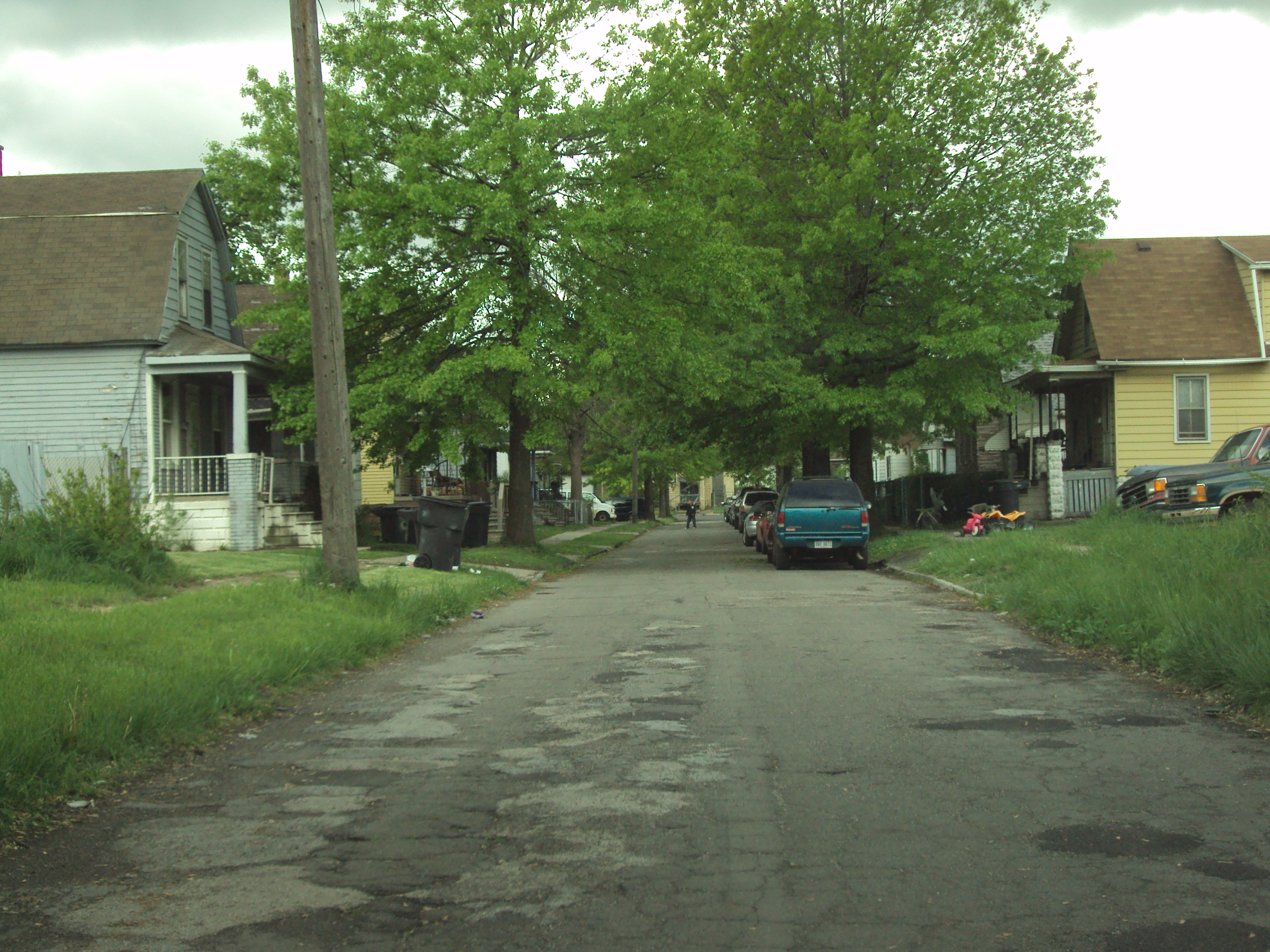
Dey Street within Delray

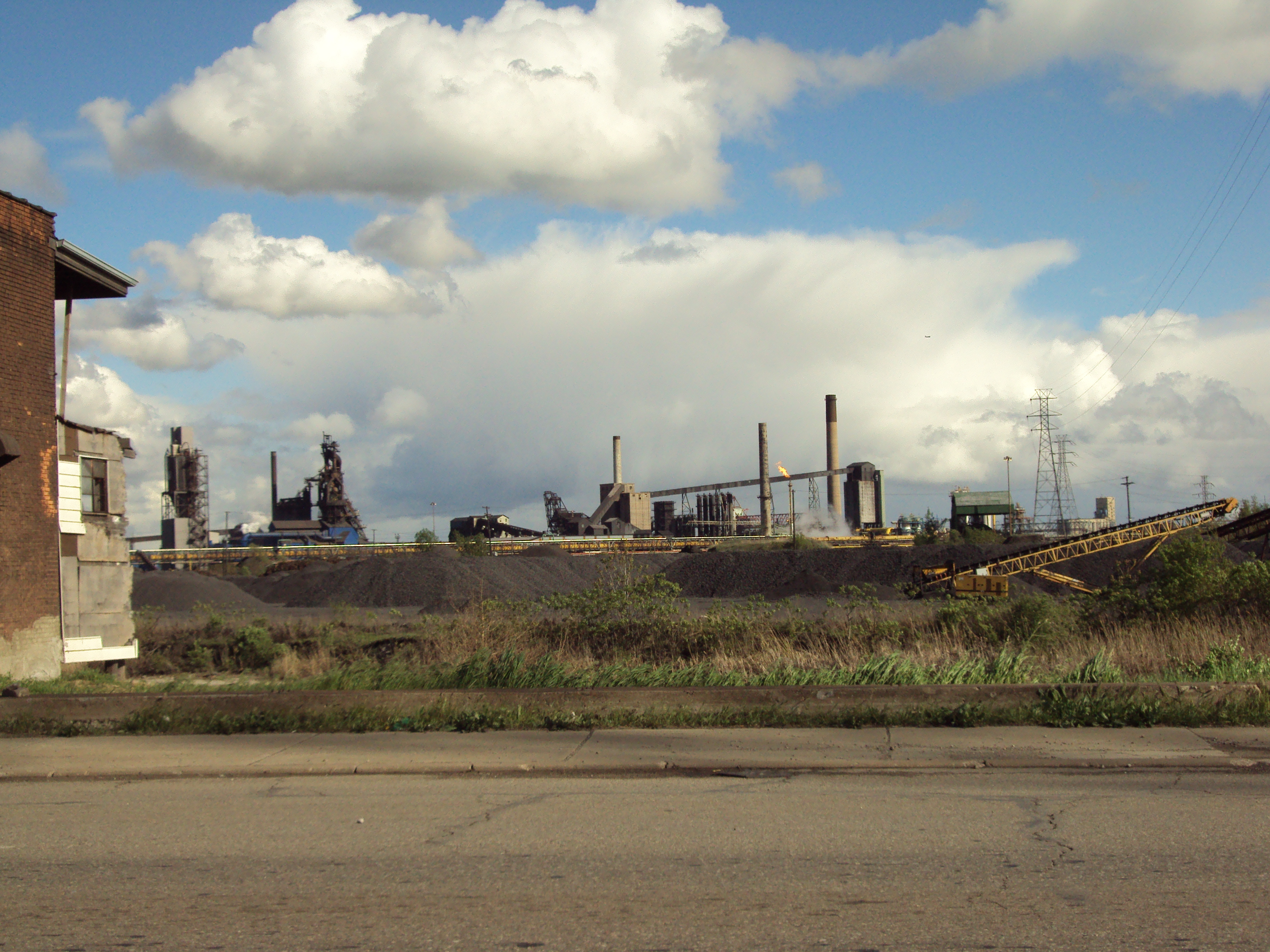
Zug Island (River Rouge) as seen from West Jefferson in Delray

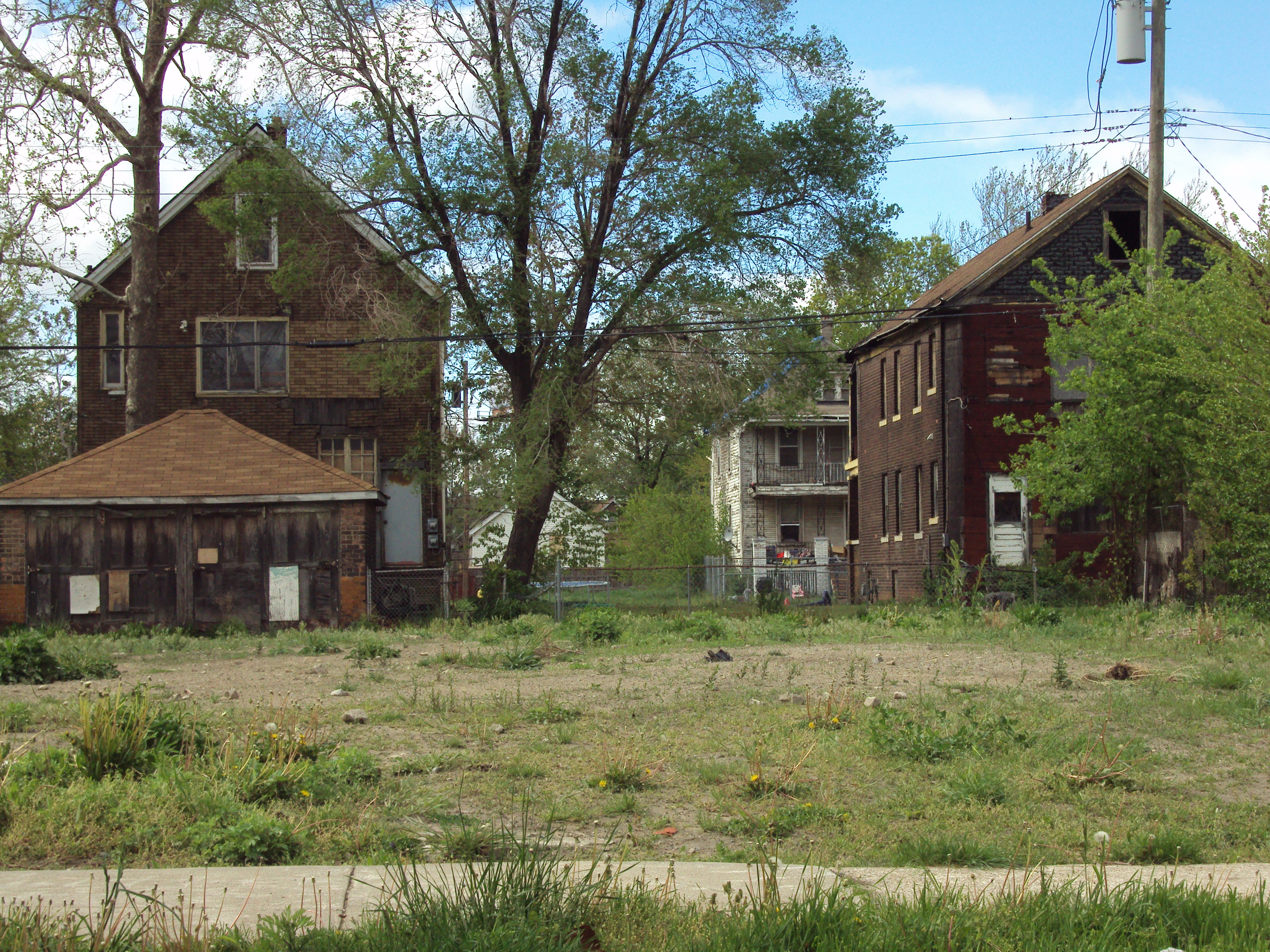
Delray in May 2010

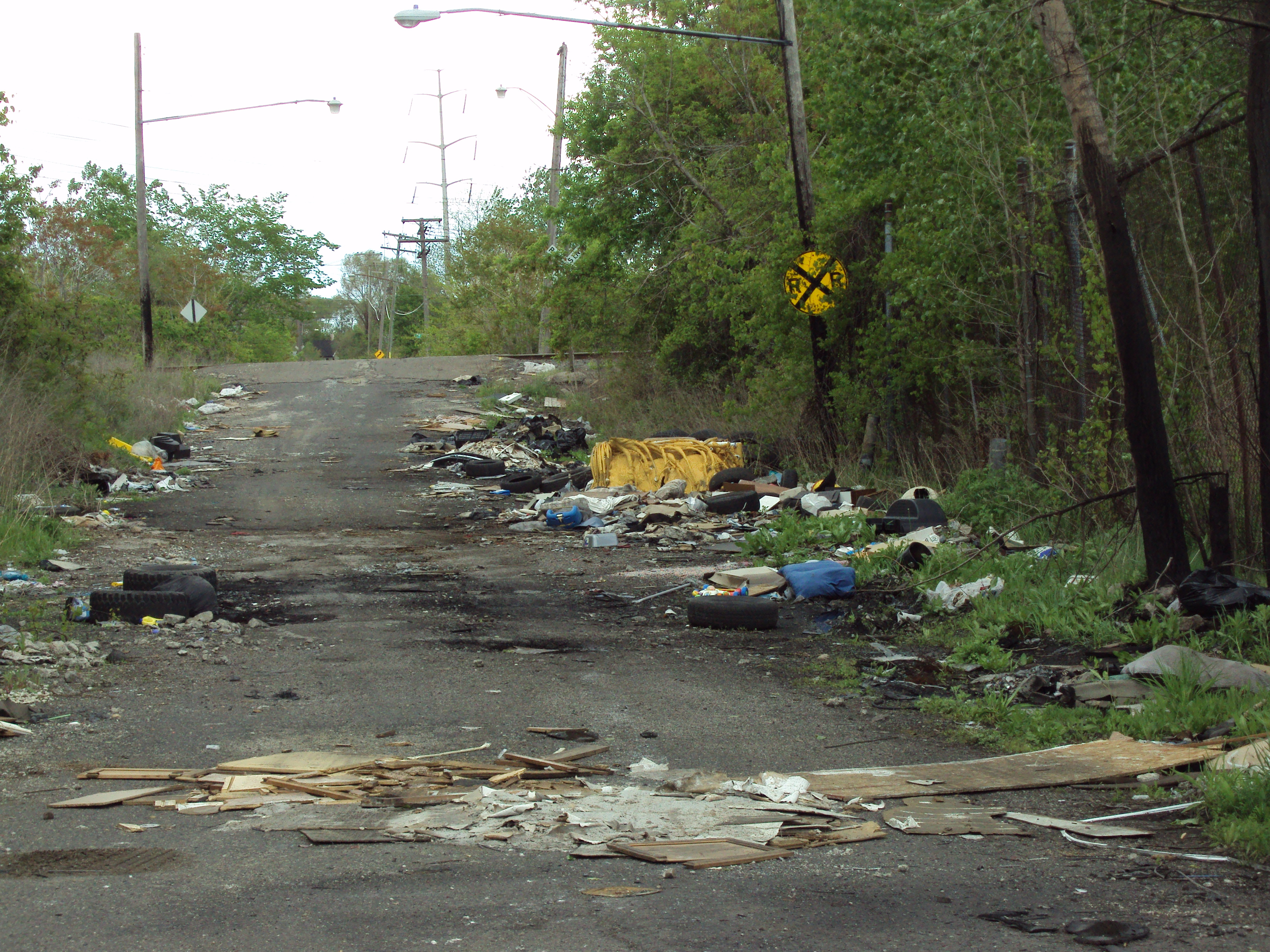
Delray in May 2010

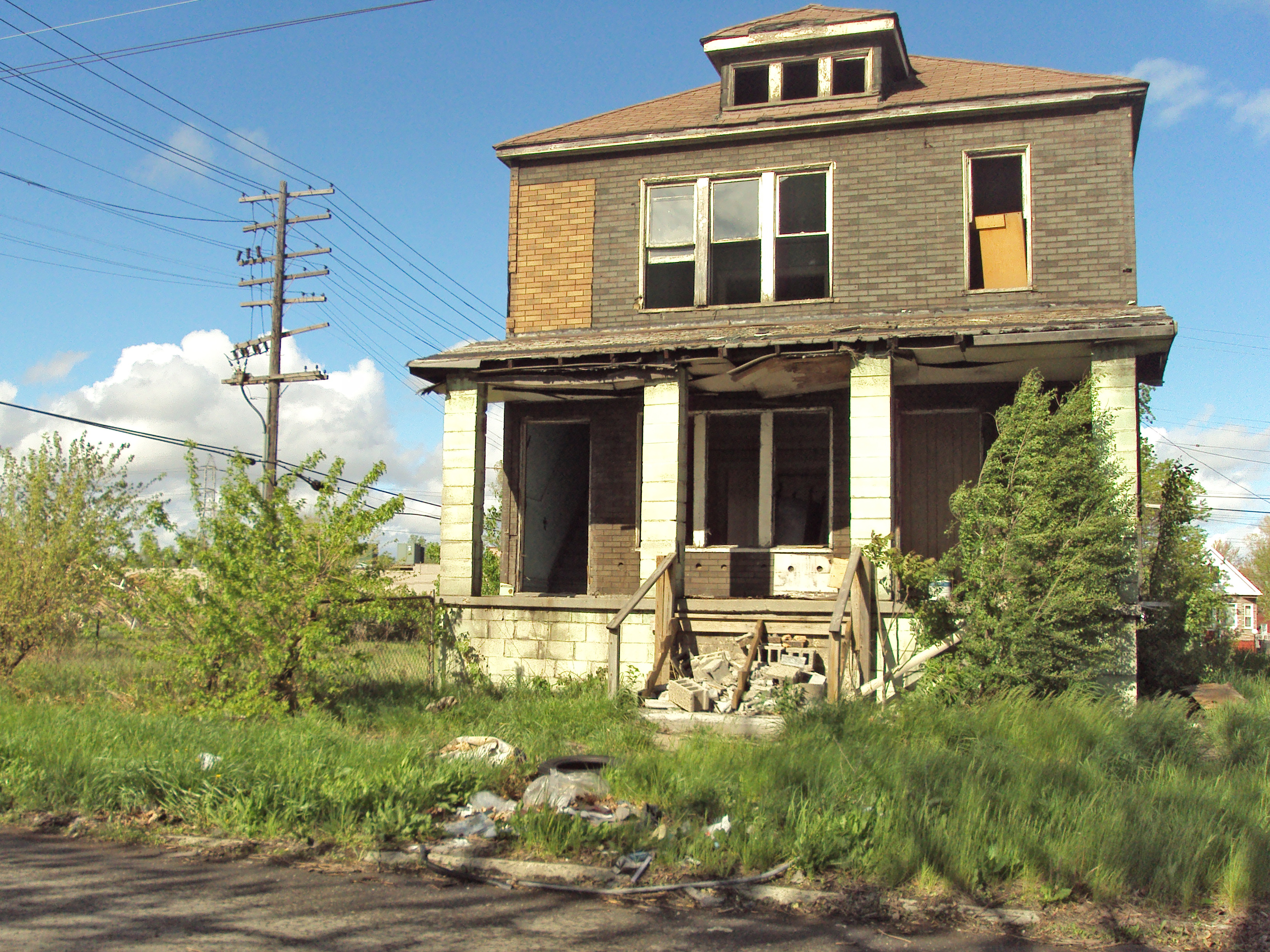
An abandoned home in Delray in 2010

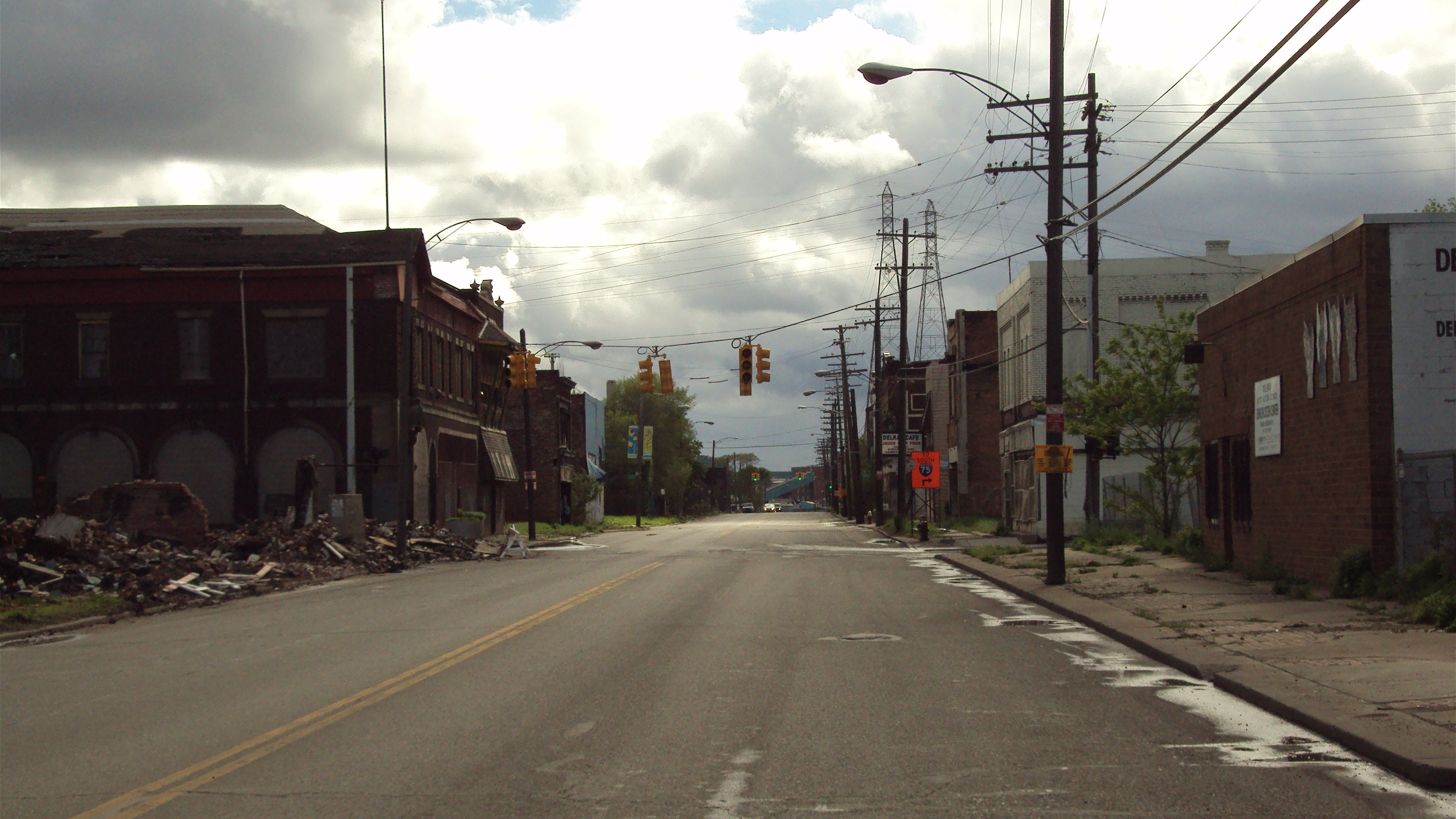
Looking south along W. Jefferson Avenue in May 2010

== See also ==
- Southwestern High School, closed high school located within Delray
