= Dale Hansen (American football) =

American football player (1921–1978)

Profile
- Position: Tackle

Personal information
- Born: January 27, 1921; Detroit, Michigan
- Died: May 6, 1978 (age 57); Warren, Michigan
- Listed height: 6 ft 3 in (1.91 m)
- Listed weight: 223 lb (101 kg)

Career information
- High school: Southwestern (Detroit, MI)
- College: Michigan State University

Career history
- Detroit Lions (1944, 1948)
- Stats at Pro Football Reference

Warren Dale Hansen (January 27, 1921 – May 6, 1978) was an American football player. He played college football for Michigan State University and professional football for the Detroit Lions.

== Early life ==
Hansen was born in 1921 in Detroit and attended Southwestern High School in that city.

He played college football for Michigan State College (later known as Michigan State University) in 1939 and 1940.

== Professional football ==
He also played professional football in the National Football League for the Detroit Lions in 1944. He also played for Detroit All-Stars in 1946 and the Paterson Panthers of the American Football League in 1947. He returned to the Lions in 1948 and appeared in 11 games as a tackle, two of them as a starter. He was placed on the inactive list in 1949 after sustaining an ankle injury. During his career, he appeared in 14 games for the Lions and 10 games for the Panthers.

== Later life ==
After his football career ended, Hansen worked for 26 years in Chrysler's cost and budgeting department. In his later years, Hansen lived in Birmingham, Michigan. Hansen died in 1978 at South Macomb Hospital in Warren, Michigan.
