= Springwells, Detroit =

- Neighborhoods of Detroit
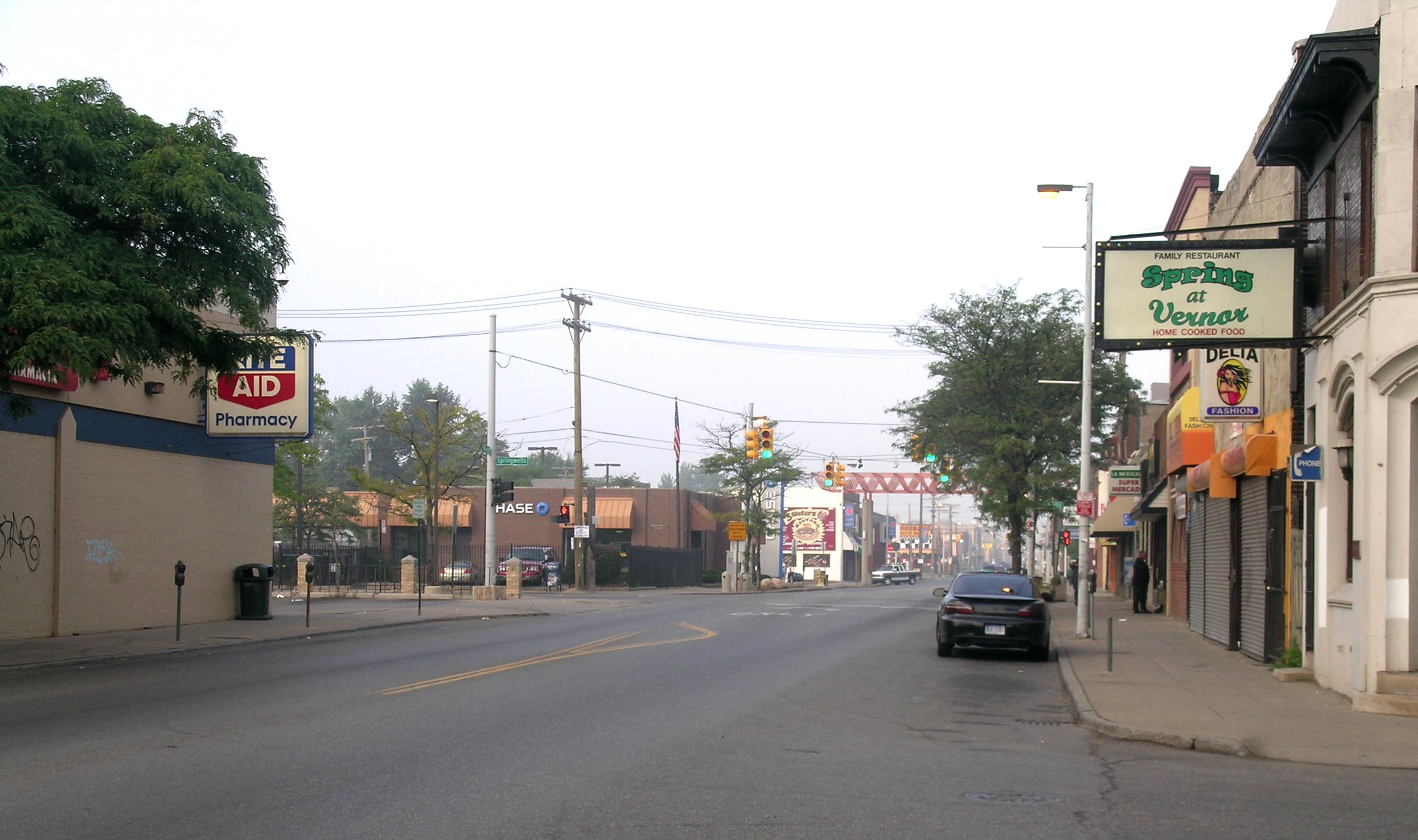
- Looking south along Vernor Highway

- Location within the city of Detroit Springwells, Detroit (Michigan)
- Coordinates: 42°18′28″N 83°07′28″W
- Country: United States
- State: Michigan
- County: Wayne
- City: Detroit
- Time zone: UTC−5 (EST)
  - Summer (DST): UTC−4 (EDT)
- ZIP code(s): 48209
- Area code: 313

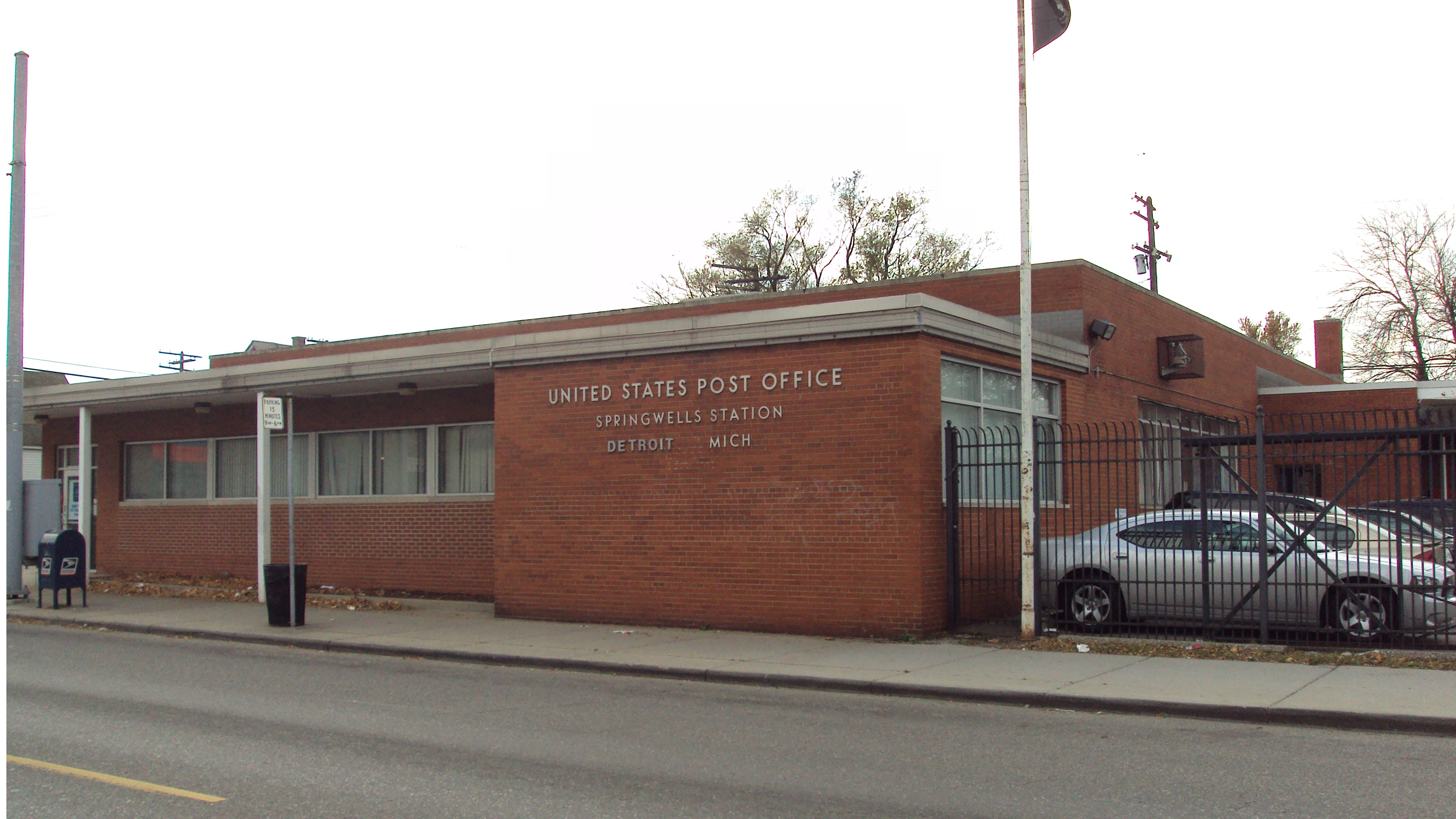
U.S. Post Office in Springwells

Springwells is a neighborhood located in Detroit, Michigan, near the Ford Motor Company River Rouge Plant.

== Etymology ==
The name cites the original village founded in 1783 and absorbed by Detroit in 1885. Father Gabriel Richard established the Springwells School in 1820. Another Springwells began in Springwells Township before also being absorbed in 1925. Named for the abundance of springs and wells. These initiatives are active to date and range in priority from housing development to resident services to specific site-based redevelopment and community rebranding strategies that generally share the desire to improve the community's image and reputation as well as its presentation in media. At times the neighborhood is also called the Springwells neighborhood in regard to city planning.

Urban Neighborhood Initiatives, a local non-profit, is working on a Springwells marketing campaign aimed at increasing economic activity for local businesses as well as attracting new businesses and residents to the area. The community rebranding process is being funded as part of a larger initiative of LISC (Local Initiatives Support Corporation) called Building Sustainable Communities which UNI was commissioned to facilitate in the neighborhood surrounding Vernor and Springwells.

== Boundaries ==
The Springwells neighborhood is typically defined as the area starting at Dix Hwy. to the north, Waterman St. to east, Fort St. to the south, and Woodmere St. to the west.

== Landmarks ==
In 2002, the West Vernor-Springwells and the West Vernor-Lawndale Historic Districts in the neighborhood were recognized by the National Register of Historic Places Springwells includes Odd Fellows Hall, a 14,000-square-foot (1,300 m^{2}) historic building built in 1917. Recently restored with funding from Governor Jennifer Granholm's Cool Cities initiative, it is hoped that the Hall will "serve as an anchor to the neighborhood and a magnet for further economic development and job creation."

== Education ==
Detroit Public Schools operates public schools.

High school students are zoned to Western International High School. High school students were previously zoned to Southwestern High School. Southwestern closed in 2012, and students were reassigned to Western..

Additionally several other school districts operate within a short walk from Springwells and Vernor including The Leona Group's Cesar Chavez Academy School District lower elementary, middle, and high school campuses as well as the WAY Academy, a charter high school in Odd Fellow's Hall on the corner of Vernor and Lawndale. Vistas Nuevas Head Start of Matrix Human Services operates several schools in the area as well including the St. Stephens center on Lawndale at Chamberlain, and the Manuel Reyes Center on Vernor at Ferris.

The neighborhood is served by Detroit Public Library's Campbell Branch Library, located at 8733 West Vernor in Springwells. In September 1907 Branch 8, the Delray Branch, opened. The branch was on West End Avenue. In January 1922 a replacement branch, James Valentine Campbell Branch on West Fort Street, operated from January 1922 to December 1996. In July 1999 the Campbell Annex Branch opened at the Holy Redeemer Cultural Center. The branch closed in August 2004. In March 2006 the Campbell Branch Library at Lawndale Station opened.

== See also ==
- West Vernor–Springwells Historic District
