= Western International High School =

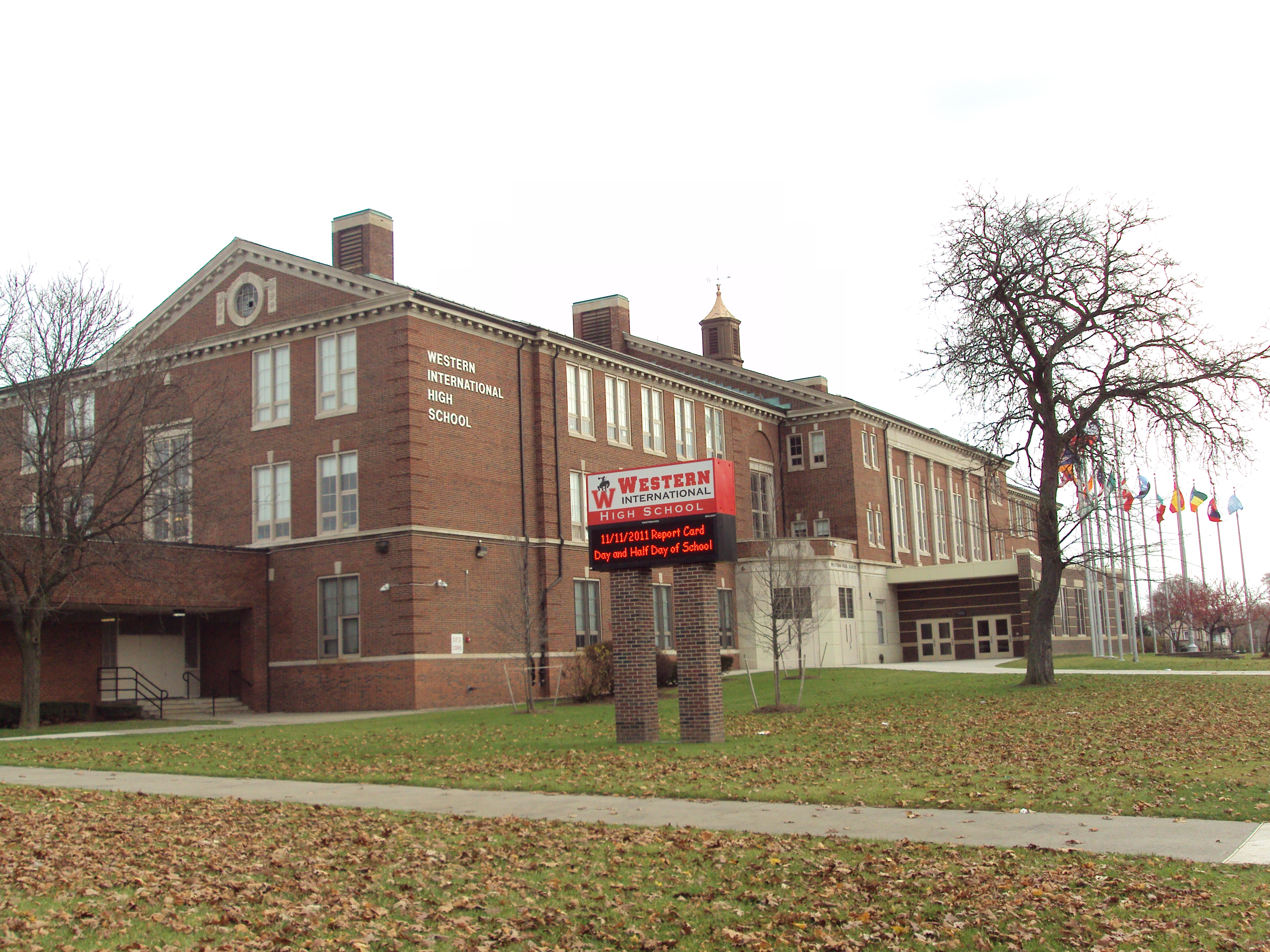

Location
- 1500 Scotten Street; Detroit, Michigan 48209; United States; 42°19′8″N 83°5′31″W

Information
- Type: Public high school
- Established: 1898
- Status: Active/open
- School district: Detroit Public Schools
- Superintendent: Nikolai Vitti
- CEEB code: 231235
- NCES School ID: 261200004857
- Principal: Angel Garcia III
- Teaching staff: 83.20 (FTE)
- Grades: 9-12
- Gender: Co-ed
- Enrollment: 1,931 (2023-2024)
- Language: English in core classes, with notable numbers of Spanish, Arabic, and French speaking students, and Spanish language and literature courses offered.
- Area: Urban
- Colors: Red and white
- Athletics conference: DPSL
- Nickname: Cowboys
- Website: Western International

Western International High School is a public high school, located across from Clark Park, within southwest Detroit's Mexicantown. Western is operated by the Detroit Public Schools system.

As of 2012, it was the final remaining public high school in southwestern Detroit. Western serves Mexicantown, Boynton–Oakwood Heights, Delray, and Springwells Village.

== History ==
The school opened in 1898 as "Western High School." The Webster School held high school classes on a temporary basis until Western was built.

On February 26, 1935, Western High School's campus was destroyed by a fire. No classes occurred during the incident. Western received a new campus as part of the Public Works Administration projects. $216,381 (around $4949139.89 when adjusted for inflation) in federal aid was used to rebuild the school.

Western International previously had a rivalry with Southwestern High School. In 2012 Southwestern closed, and part of its boundary was reassigned to Western International. Students from both schools protested the closure of Southwestern, the perceived quality of education, and DPS policies. As a result, over 100 students from Western received suspensions, with several also receiving tickets from police officers. In response several students started a "freedom school" so they could receive education during their suspensions.

In 2015 DPS designated Western as part of the "Clark Park K-12 Educational Comunidad" ("Comunidad" means community in Spanish) along with Earhart and Maybury elementary schools.

== Academics ==
=== Curriculum ===
As of 2000 the school offered training programs in technical skills, including work and school cooperative programs, with business education, computer-assisted drafting, desktop publishing, office management, and office technology available. In 1999 there were six teachers that were a part of this program, and the number doubled by 2000. In 2000 the school did not offer skilled manufacturing and trade courses. These courses were offered at five different technical centers in Detroit, and interested students would arrive to their regular school early and board buses bound for a technical center. That year the technical schools had limited numbers of recruitment information available in Spanish, the primary language of many students at Western.

Student assessments
- 2021–22 school year Change vs. prior year

M-STEP 11th grade proficiency rates (Science / Social Studies)
- Advanced %: 1.0 / 1.3
- Proficient %: – / 6.8
- PR. Proficient %: 7.2 / 46.1
- Not Proficient %: 83.8 / 45.8

Average test scores
- SAT Total: 782.8 (▼ −70.4)

=== Admission ===
WIHS holds no admission test; enrollment is open to all Detroiters of high school age. Western is the most culturally diverse public high school in Detroit; the student body is (approximate figures) 72.2% Hispanic/Latino, 20.6% African American, 5.3% Caucasian, and 1.9% listed as "other".

== Notable alumni ==
Author and athlete Ken Doherty was a 1923 graduate of Western High School, and went on to athletic fame as an All-American track and field performer at Detroit City College. During much of the 1920s, he was the nation's best decathlon performer; he won a bronze medal in the decathlon at the 1928 Olympic Games in Amsterdam. Doherty's Track and Field Omnibook (1971) is the world's most widely read publication on the sport of track and field.

Screenwriter John Briley (class of 1943) is a writer best known for screenplays of biopics. He won the 1982Academy Award For Best Original Screenplay for Gandhi. He has also written for television and theatre, and published several novels.

Swimmer John Dudeck (class of 1952) was a nationally renowned athlete; as a WHS senior, he competed at the 1952 US Olympic Trials. On the collegiate scene, he swam for Michigan State University. A former Big Ten Conference record holder and two-time Big Ten titlist in the 100-yard breaststroke (1953, 54), Dudeck was a nine-time All-American for the Spartans (1953–55).

King Cole is a former MLB player for the Chicago Cubs, Pittsburgh Pirates, and the New York Yankees.

George Lerchen is a former MLB player for the Detroit Tigers and the Cincinnati Reds.

George Saldana was named to the 1963 National Interscholastic Swimming Coaches Association (NISCA) All-America team, in the 400-yard freestyle event.

Todd Cruz (1955–2008) was a 1973 Western graduate who played six seasons of Major League Baseball. In 1982, he hit 16 home runs and drove in 57 runs for the Seattle Mariners. One year later, as a member of the Baltimore Orioles, he took part in the 1983 World Series.

Ron Simpkins was a 1976 graduate of Western High School. He then enrolled at the University of Michigan to play football for coach Bo Schembechler. While attending Michigan, Simpkins earned NCAA All-America recognition; he also won the school's John Maulbetsch Award in 1977, and team MVP honors in 1979. He would eventually become the university's all-time leading tackler. Upon graduation, Simpkins entered the National Football League draft; he was selected by the Cincinnati Bengals in the 7th round (167th overall). He played in Super Bowl XVI at the Pontiac Silverdome, losing to Joe Montana and the San Francisco 49ers. Simpkins would play in six NFL seasons before taking 1988 off. He returned for one more year in 1989, with the Green Bay Packers. In the spring of 1990, Simpkins came home to coach football. During a career that spanned eighteen seasons, he was at the helm for the Cowboys of Western High School; he retired in 2007.
