= Demographics of Metro Detroit =

Demographics of region

Historical population
Census	Pop.	Note	%±
1950	3,016,197		—
1960	3,762,360		24.7%
1970	4,307,470		14.5%
1980	4,353,365		1.1%
1990	4,482,299		3.0%
2000	4,752,557		6.0%
2010	5,196,250		9.3%
2017 (est.)	5,992,060		15.3%

As of the census of 2010, there were 5,196,250 people, 1,682,111 households, and 1,110,454 families residing within the Detroit–Warren–Ann Arbor Combined Statistical Area (Detroit CSA). Within the Detroit–Warren–Dearborn Metropolitan Statistical Area (Detroit MSA), there were 4,296,250 people residing. The census reported 70.1% White, 22.8% African-American, 0.3% Native American, 3.3% Asian, 0.02% Pacific Islander, 1.2% from other races, and 2.2% from two or more races. Hispanic or Latino of any race were 6.2% of the population. Arab Americans were at least 4.7% of the region's population.

As of the 2017 American Community Survey estimates, the median income for a household in the MSA was $57,101, and the median income for a family was $72,119. The per capita income for the MSA was $44,403.

== History ==
In 1701, French officer Antoine de La Mothe Cadillac, along with fifty-one additional French-Canadians, founded a settlement called Fort Ponchartrain du Détroit, naming it after the comte de Pontchartrain, Minister of Marine under Louis XIV. The French legacy can be observed today in the names of many area cities (ex. Detroit, Grosse Pointe, Grosse Ile) and streets (ex. Gratiot, Beaubien, St. Antoine, Cadieux).

Later came an influx of persons of British and German descent, followed by Polish, Irish, Italian, Lebanese, Assyrian, Greek, Jewish, Armenian, and Belgian immigrants who made their way to the area in the early 20th century and during and after World War II. There was a large migration into the city from the rural South following World War I.

== Population by ethnicity ==
Racial Composition of Metro Detroit (as of 2010)
Self-identified race	Percent of population
Non-Hispanic white	65.18%
Hispanic and Latino (of any race)	6.2%
Black or African American	22.8%
Asian	3.3%
Two or more races	2.2%
Native Americans and Alaska Natives	0.3%
Native Hawaiians and Other Pacific Islanders	0.02%

The census of 2010 reported 70.1% White, 22.8% African American, 0.3% Native American, 3.3% Asian, 0.02% Pacific Islander, 1.2% from other races, and 2.2% from two or more races. Hispanic or Latino of any race were 6.2% of the population. Arab Americans were at least 4.7% of the region's population.

=== Ethnic groups ===
According to the United States Census Bureau, as of July 2018, approximately 79.1% of those residing in the City of Detroit proper are African American. Most but not all of the suburban cities are still predominantly white. In the 2000s, 115 of the 185 cities and townships in Metro Detroit were over 95% white. Of the more than 240,000 suburban blacks in Metro Detroit, 44% lived in Inkster, Oak Park, Pontiac, and Southfield. Highland Park and Hamtramck, two cities surrounded by Detroit, have a similar split with Highland Park being 93% African American but Hamtramck only 15%. In Wayne County, the city of Dearborn has a large concentration of Arab Americans, mainly Lebanese. Recently, the area has witnessed some growth in Albanian, Asian and Hispanic populations. Immigration continues to play a role in the region's projected growth with the population of Detroit-Ann Arbor-Flint (CMSA) estimated to be 6,191,000 by 2025.

Oakland County is among the most affluent counties in the United States with populations over one million.

== Religion ==
Religious groups in Metro Detroit include Christianity (67%), Islam (3%), Judaism (2%), Hinduism (1%), Buddhism (1%), and other groups.

== Immigration and foreign-born origins ==
A 2013 report by Global Detroit and Data Driven Detroit stated that there were almost 400,000 immigrants combined in Wayne, Oakland, Macomb, and Washtenaw counties. The largest groups are, in order, India, Mexico, Iraq, Canada, and Lebanon. Throughout the entire U.S. the largest immigration group comes from Mexico. Of those living in the four county region as of 2013, about 8% were not born in the United States. That year, the percentages of people not born in the United States were 41% in Hamtramck, 27% in Dearborn, 26% in Troy, and 23% in Sterling Heights. 5% of people within the city of Detroit are immigrants, making the percentage of immigrants in Detroit the lowest such percentage out of those of the 25 largest cities in the United States. The national average is about 13%.

The first wave of immigrants, including Germans, Irish, and Poles, arrived in the mid-19th Century. In 1900 Detroit had 96,503 people who were not born in the United States. This figure increased to 157,534 in 1910. In the early 20th Century the largest wave of immigrants came to work at automobile factories. The immigrants arrived from Armenia, Belgium, Greece, Hungary, Italy, Russia, Syria, and Ukraine. Initially the volume was in the thousands. The volume increased to the tens of thousands after Henry Ford announced that workers would be paid $5 per day. As a result, Austrians, Belarusians, Bulgarians, Croatians, Finns, Lithuanians, Macedonians, Norwegians, Romanians, Serbians, Slovaks, and Swedes traveled to Detroit. By 1925 almost half of Detroit's population was not born in the United States.

By 2001 many Bangladeshi Americans had moved from New York City, particularly Astoria, Queens, to the east side of Detroit and Hamtramck. Many moved because of lower costs of living, larger amounts of space, work available in small factories, and the large Muslim community in Metro Detroit. Many Bangladeshi Americans who moved into Queens, and then onwards to Metro Detroit had origins in Sylhet. In 2002 over 80% of the Bangladeshi population within Wayne, Oakland, and Macomb counties lived in Hamtramck and some surrounding neighborhoods in Detroit. That area overall had almost 1,500 ethnic Bangladeshis, almost 75% of Bangladeshis in the entire state of Michigan.

== LGBT population ==
As of 2007 Ferndale is the center of the LGBT community in Metro Detroit. As of 1997 many LGBT people reside in Ferndale, Pleasant Ridge, and Royal Oak. Model D stated in 2007 that there are populations of LGBT people in some Detroit neighborhoods such as East English Village, Indian Village, Lafayette Park, and Woodbridge and that the concentration of gay bars in Detroit is "decentralized". As of 1997, Detroit is reported to be racially segregated between gays of different economic and racial backgrounds.

== See also ==
- Demographic history of Detroit
