= St. Leo High School (Detroit, Michigan) =

St. Leo High School (Michigan)

Location
- 4860 15th Street; Detroit, Michigan; United States

Information
- Type: Private, Coeducational
- Established: 1892
- Closed: 1971
- Grades: 9–12
- Colors: Red and White
- Athletics conference: Catholic High School League
- Nickname: Lions

St. Leo High School was a Catholic high school established in 1892 in Detroit, Michigan, United States.

It was designed by Donaldson and Meier, an architectural firm based in Detroit, Michigan. Founded in 1880 by John M. Donaldson (1854–1941) and Henry J. Meier (1858–1917),

St. Leo was one of only nine Catholic high schools established in the 1800s in the Detroit area:

1. Detroit Sacred Heart Academy (1851)
2. University of Detroit High School (1877)
3. Detroit Felician (1882)
4. Detroit Holy Redeemer (1882)
5. St. Mary's Preparatory (1885)
6. Grosse Pointe Academy of the Sacred Heart (1887)
7. Detroit St. Joseph (1889)
8. Detroit Sweetest Heart of Mary(1890)
9. Detroit St. Leo (1892)

In 1926, St. Leo faced Detroit Holy Redeemer in the very first football game to determine the champion of the Detroit Parochial League (later the CHSL). St. Leo lost that game 14-9.

St. Leo High School was located on 15th Street between Grand River Avenue and West Warren Avenue, just a few blocks from the site where the 1967 Detroit riots began. The school closed in 1971.
