= Sweetest Heart of Mary High School =

- 4440 Russell St. Detroit, Michigan; United States

Information
- Type: Private, Coed
- Established: 1890
- Closed: 1965
- Grades: 9–12
- Colors: Green and White
- Athletics conference: Catholic High School League
- Nickname: Hawks

Sweetest Heart of Mary High School was a Coeducational Catholic high school in Detroit, Michigan. The school was staffed by the Sisters of St. Joseph.

Sweetest Heart of Mary was one of only nine Catholic high schools established in the 1800s in the Detroit area:

1. Detroit Sacred Heart Academy (1851)
2. University of Detroit High School (1877)
3. Detroit Felician (1882)
4. Detroit Holy Redeemer (1882)
5. St. Mary's Preparatory (1885)
6. Grosse Pointe Academy of the Sacred Heart (1887)
7. Detroit St. Joseph (1889)
8. Sweetest Heart of Mary (1890)
9. Detroit St. Leo (1892)

Sweetest Heart of Mary High School closed in 1965
