= Lawndale, Illinois =

Lawndale, Illinois may refer to:

- Lawndale, Logan County, Illinois; an unincorporated community
- Lawndale Township, McLean County, Illinois
- In Chicago
  - South Lawndale, Chicago, a neighborhood
  - North Lawndale, Chicago, a neighborhood

== See also ==
- Lawndale (disambiguation)
