= Felician Academy (Detroit, Michigan) =

- Detroit, Michigan; United States

Information
- Type: Private, All-Girls
- Established: 1882
- Closed: 1967
- Grades: 9–12
- Colors: Blue and Silver
- Athletics conference: Catholic High School League

Felician Academy was an all-girls Catholic high school in Detroit, Michigan. The school was opened in 1882 and was operated by the Felician Sisters.

Felician Academy was one of only nine Catholic high schools established in the 1800s in the Detroit area:

1. Detroit Sacred Heart Academy (1851)

2. University of Detroit High School (1877)

3. Detroit Felician (1882)

3. Detroit Holy Redeemer (1882)

5. St. Mary's Preparatory (1885)

6. Grosse Pointe Academy of the Sacred Heart (1887)

7. Detroit St. Joseph (1889)

8. Detroit Sweetest Heart of Mary(1890)

9. Detroit St. Leo (1892)

Felician Academy closed in 1967.
