= St. Joseph High School (Detroit, Michigan) =

St. Joseph High School (Detroit)
- Detroit, Michigan; United States

Information
- Type: Private, for men
- Established: 1889
- Closed: 1964
- Grades: 9–12
- Colors: Blue and White
- Athletics conference: Catholic High School League
- Nickname: Blue Jays

St. Joseph High School was an all boys Catholic high school established in 1889 in Detroit, Michigan, United States.

St. Joseph was one of only nine Catholic high schools established in the 1800s in the Detroit area:

1. Detroit Sacred Heart Academy (1851)
2. University of Detroit High School (1877)
3. Detroit Felician (1882)
4. Detroit Holy Redeemer (1882)
5. St. Mary's Preparatory (1885)
6. Grosse Pointe Academy of the Sacred Heart (1887)
7. St. Joseph (1889)
8. Detroit Sweetest Heart of Mary (1890)
9. Detroit St. Leo (1892)

== Athletics ==
St. Joseph met Detroit Miller High School in 1947 at Detroit's Olympia Stadium in what became the first City Basketball Championship game in Detroit PSL and Catholic High School League history. St. Joseph lost that game 47-34 before a Michigan high school record attendance of 11,563.
