= Lawndale, Michigan =

Lawndale may refer to these places in the U.S. state of Michigan:

- Lawndale, Kalamazoo County, Michigan in Comstock Township
- Lawndale, Saginaw County, Michigan in Saginaw Charter Township

== See also ==
- West Vernor-Lawndale Historic District in Detroit, Michigan
- Lawndale (disambiguation)
