= Bagley-West Vernor Historic District =

- U.S. National Register of Historic Places
- U.S. Historic district
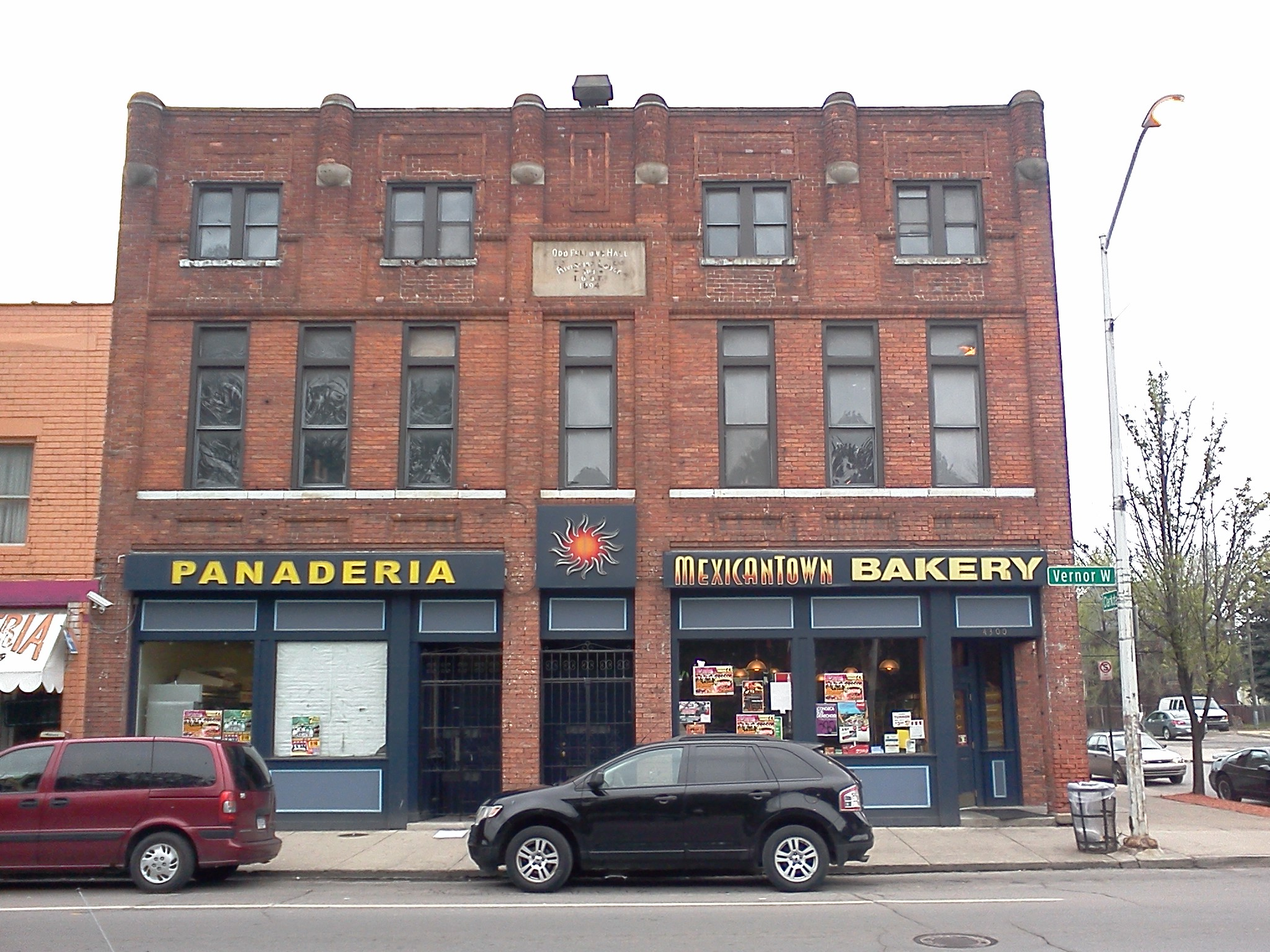
- Mexicantown Bakery (4300-4308 West Vernor; I.O.O.F. Riverside Lodge No. 303)
- Interactive map
- Location: Generally, 2443-3500 Bagley St. and 1753-4750 W. Vernor; Detroit, Michigan
- Coordinates: 42°19′23″N 83°05′16″W
- Built: 1920
- Architect: Donaldson and Meier, William B. Stratton, John Scott
- Architectural style: Italianate, Neoclassical, Queen Anne, Spanish Colonial Revival, Tudor Revival, Art Deco, Postmodern, Commercial Brick
- MPS: Detroit’s Latino Communities
- NRHP reference No.: 100012599
- Added to NRHP: January 22, 2026

The Bagley-West Vernor Historic District is a commercial historic district, covering much of the commercial area of the Mexicantown neighborhood of Detroit. The district contains two groupings of buildings. The first, located east of Interstate 96, includes buildings located along Vernor Highway approximately between 18th and 20th Street, and along Bagley Street approximately between 17th and 20th Street, as well as some structures in between. The second, located west of Interstate 96, includes buildings located along Vernor Highway approximately between the freeway and Ferdinand Street, and along Bagley Street approximately between the freeway and 24th Street. The district is significant because of its association with the development of Latino culture and history in Detroit. It was listed on the National Register of Historic Places in 2026.

== History ==
The area within the Bagley-West Vernor Historic District was developed in the late 19th and early 20th centuries, as the city of Detroit expanded to the southwest. In the 1910s an 20s, Detroit's manufacturers established factories just outside city limits in this area. The surge of manufacturing jobs attracted new residents to Detroit, including a large number of Latino (primarily Mexican) families. At first, these new residents lived in various places around the city, but as the 20th century progressed, more Latino residents congregated in Southwest Detroit near Barley and Vernor Streets. This was accelerated as Puerto Rican, Cuban, and other nationalities joined the primarily Mexican earlier residents. In the latter half of the century, particularly after the 1967 Detroit riot, earlier European residents of Southwest Detroit moved out of the city, leaving areas for the newer Latino residents to move into. As more Latino residents moved into the neighborhood, the commercial corridors of Bagley and Vernor also transitioned to more Latino businesses.

Some of the first Latino businesses were food-related, spaces where residents could access specific foods that might not be available from other locations. Thus, some of the first Latino businesses in the district were grocers, bakeries, tortillerias, and restaurants. As more Latino families moved into the area, other businesses were opened, including bars, dance halls, and record shops. In the 1960s, construction of a new freeway cut through the commercial sections of Bagley and Vernor, and a number of businesses and homes were razed. Through the 20th and into the 21st century, the Latino population continues to be a large constituent of the residents in the area, and Latino businesses are ubiquitous in the Bagley-West Vernor Historic District.

== Description ==
The Bagley-West Vernor Historic District is located along a stretch of Bagley Street and West Vernor Highway. The district is primarily commercial, but does include some one- and two-family residences, apartment buildings, churches, and a library. The district contains 116 buildings. of with 66 contribute to the character of the district.

The oldest commercial buildings in the district, dating from the 1870s thorough 1890s, are located along Bagley at the eastern end of the districts. These are primarily brick buildings exhibiting Italianate and Victorian styles. Other buildings were constructed later in the 19th and into the 20th century; most had minimal embellishments, although some exhibited more high style forms.

== Gallery ==
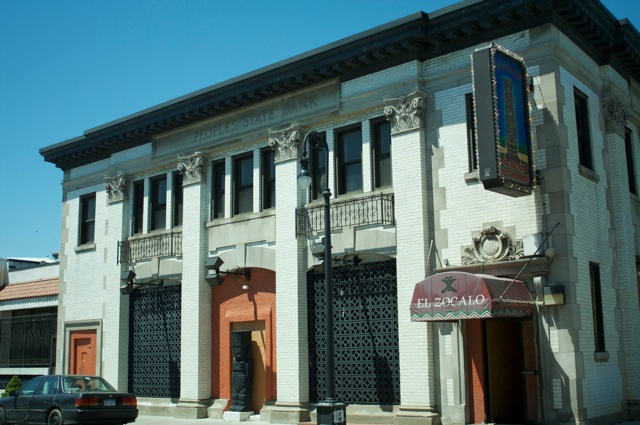
El Zocalo (3400 Bagley, Peoples State Bank)

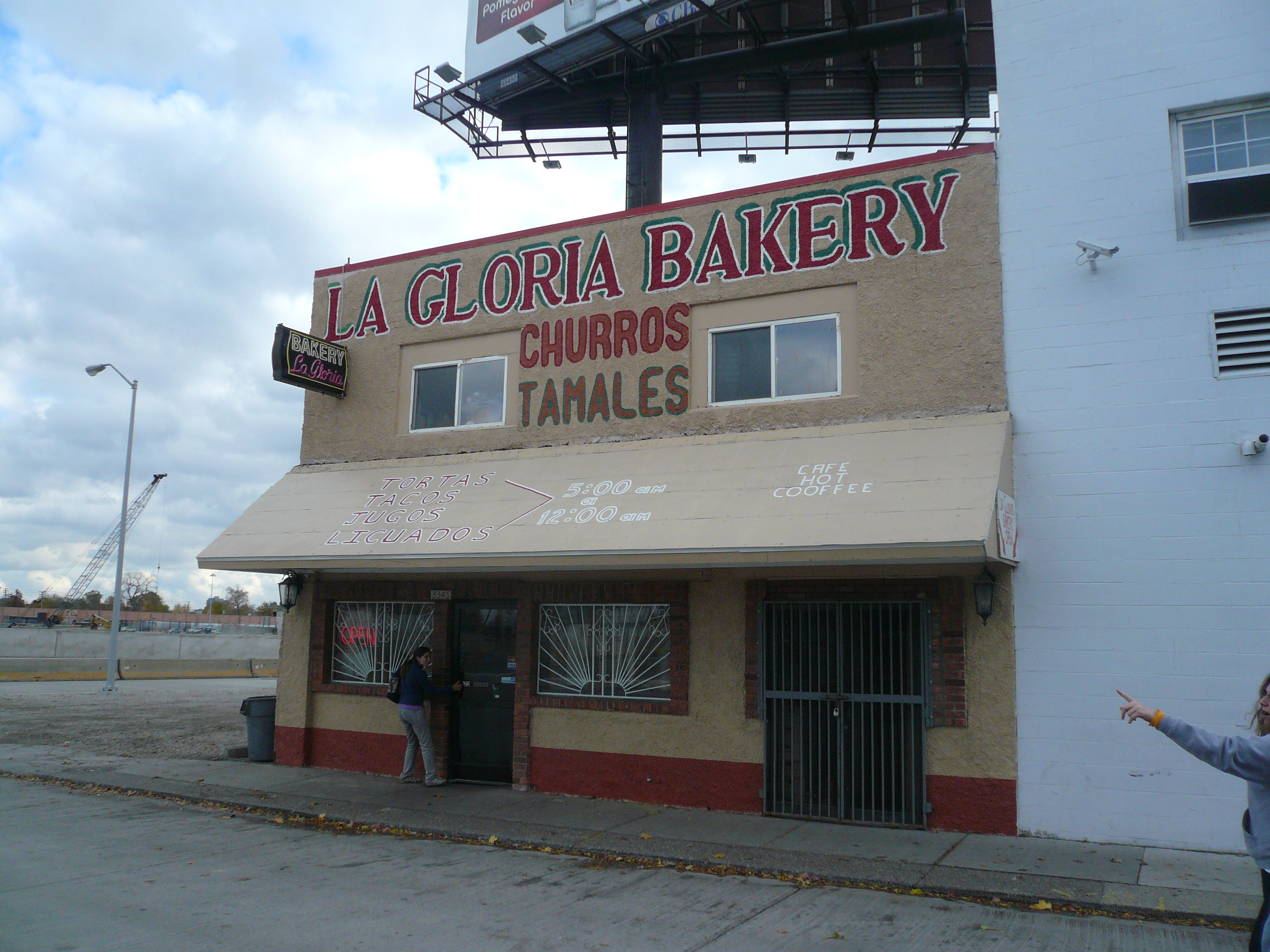
La Gloria Bakery (3345 Bagley)

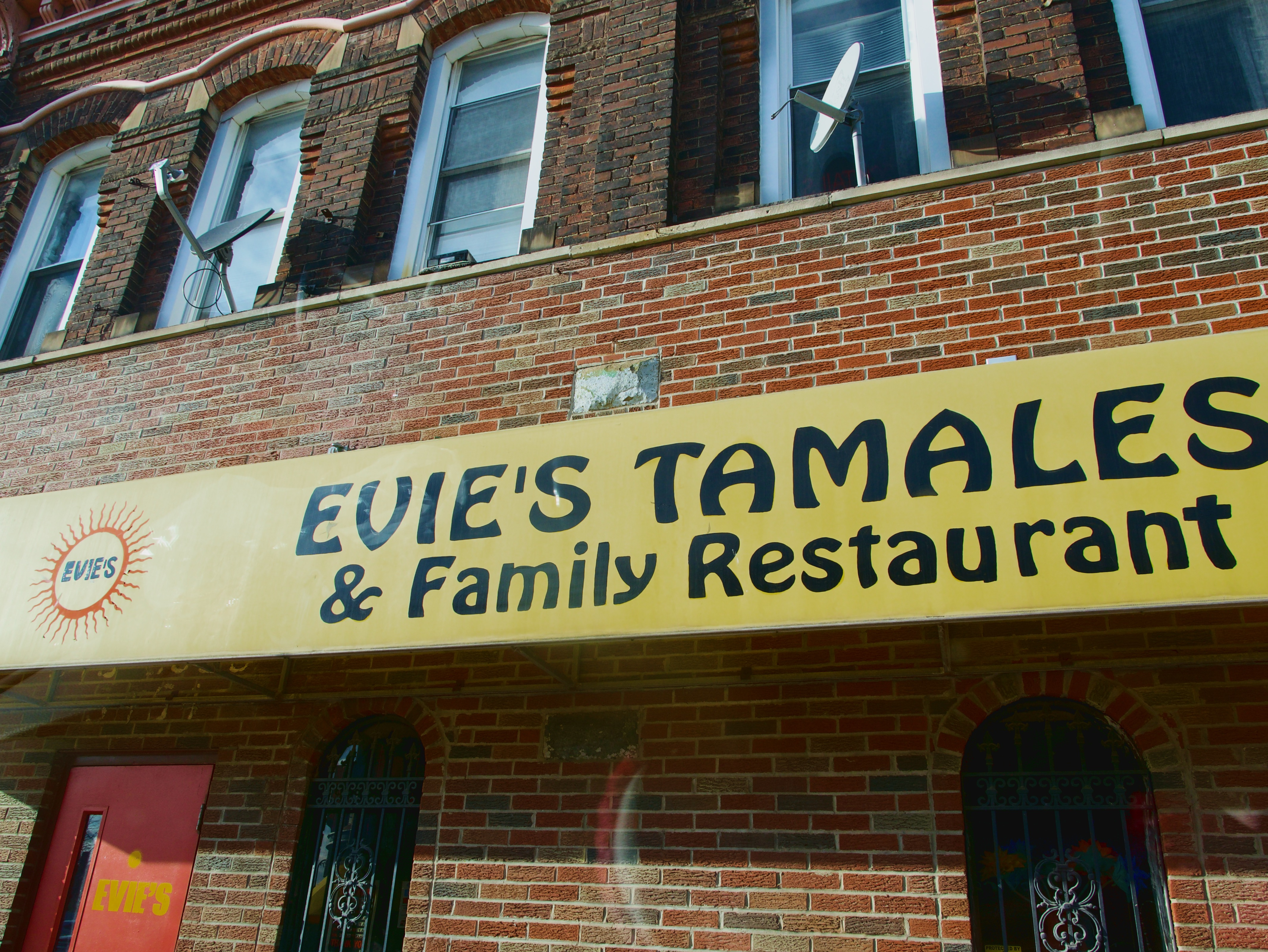
Evie's Tamales (3434-3456 Bagley)

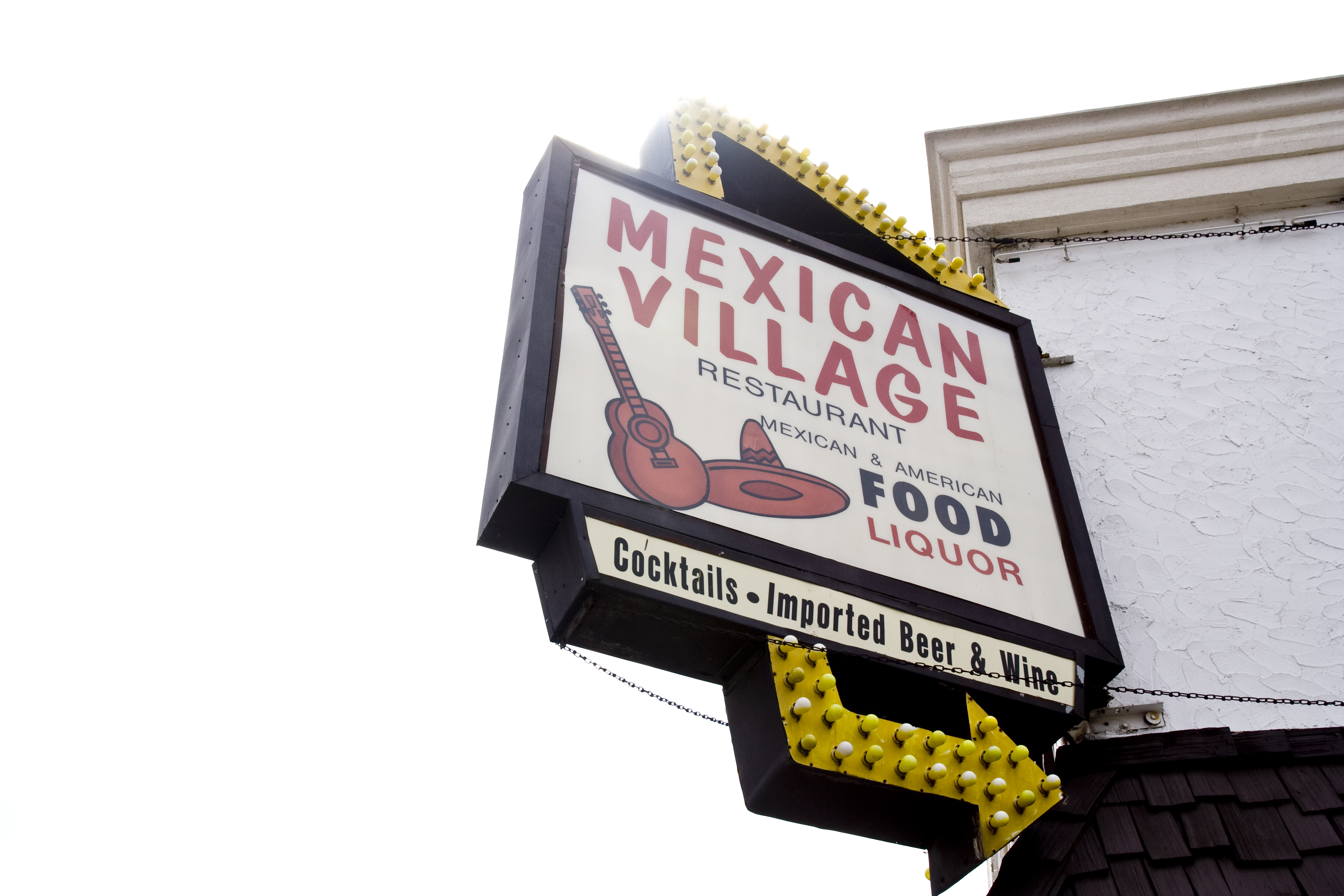
Mexican Village (2600 Bagley)

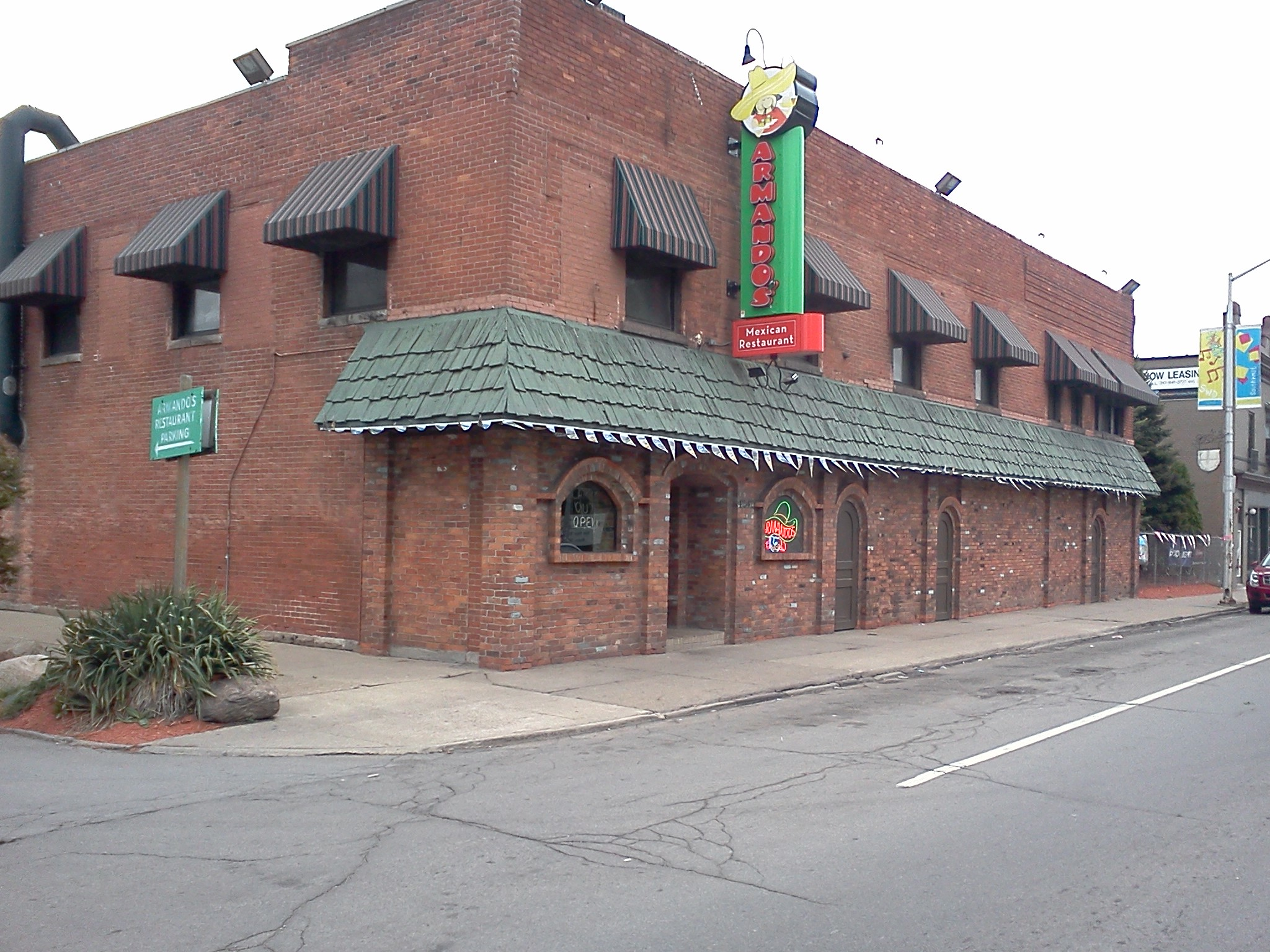
Armando’s Mexican Restaurant (4242 West Vernor)

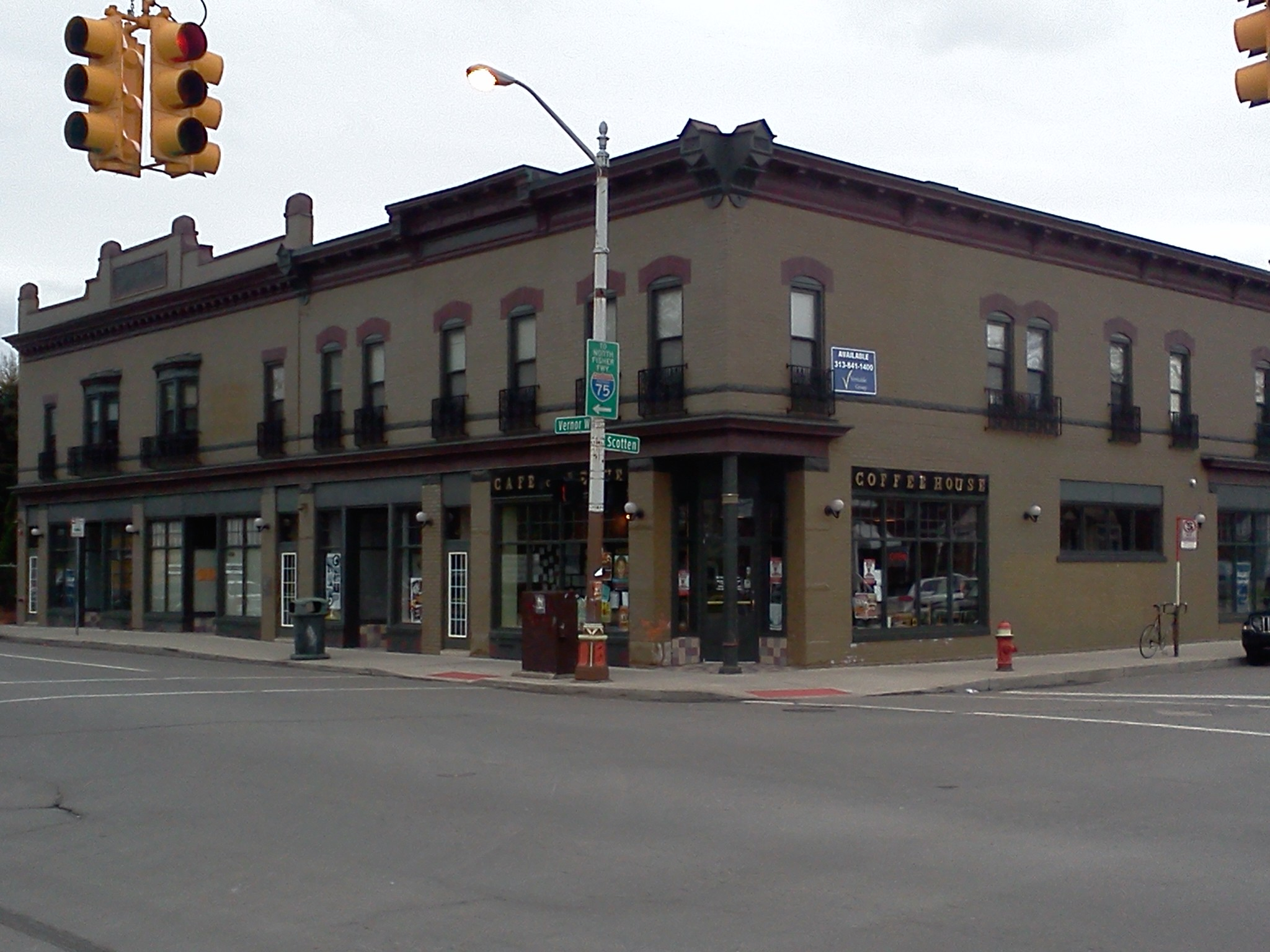
Cafe Con Leche (4200-4208 West Vernor)
