= History of Mexican Americans in Metro Detroit =

In 2004 58.5% of the people of Hispanic origin in the Wayne County-Macomb County-Oakland County tri-county area were Mexicans.

The Hispanic population is 8% of Detroit proper, mainly Mexican and then Puerto Rican.

== Population history ==
In 1910 the State of Michigan had fewer than 100 Mexicans. In the 20th century the original Mexicans arriving in Detroit came from the central portion of Mexico. Mexicans moved to Detroit to get industrial jobs, including Henry Ford's $5 per day jobs. The community of Mexicantown, originally known as "La Bagley", was established to provide Mexican-oriented goods and services. Historians estimated that in reality Detroit alone had over 4,000 Mexicans even though the U.S. census of 1920 only counted 1,268 Mexicans in the entire state.

In 1951 in Detroit there were about 15,000 to 17,000 U.S.-born ethnic Mexicans and 12,000 Mexican-born residents.

Around the 1950s/1960s, the second generation and third generation of Mexicans had been born in Michigan and their presence caused the size of the Metro Detroit Mexican community to increase.

== Demographics ==
In 2014 there were 22,700 Mexican immigrants in Wayne County, making Mexicans the largest immigrant group in that county. Within Metro Detroit overall, Mexicans are the third-largest immigrant group. In Macomb and Oakland counties, the Mexican populations are among the ten largest immigrant groups in each county.

== Commerce ==
Around the 1950s and 1960s large numbers of second and third generation ethnic Mexicans worked in steel foundries, steel factories, and automotive plants.

== Media ==
Jose R. Flores founded El Informador in 1954. It closed in 1956. After the end of El Informador, Jose Flores bought El Atomo. He changed its name to Noticias ("News"). In 1958 a Monterrey-originating teacher, Jose Elisandro, established Ecos de Michigan ("Echoes from Michigan"). Noticias closed at the time Ecos opened. Six months later, El Heraldo ("The Herald") opened and Ecos closed. El Heraldo closed in 1961.

Beginning in 1961, when there were no Michigan-based Spanish language newspapers, area Mexicans read Spanish language newspapers from other states. They included El Diaro, Excelsior, El Informador, Iniversal, El Norte, Novedades, La Opinión, and La Prensa.

== Institutions ==
Several mutual aid societies historically served the Mexican community. Among them were the Los Caballeros Catolicos and the VFW Mexican American Post #505. In 1960 the youth group Club Camellia was founded. In 1961 the Comite de Festejos Guadalupanos ("Committee of Guadalupe Parties") was founded.

== Religion ==
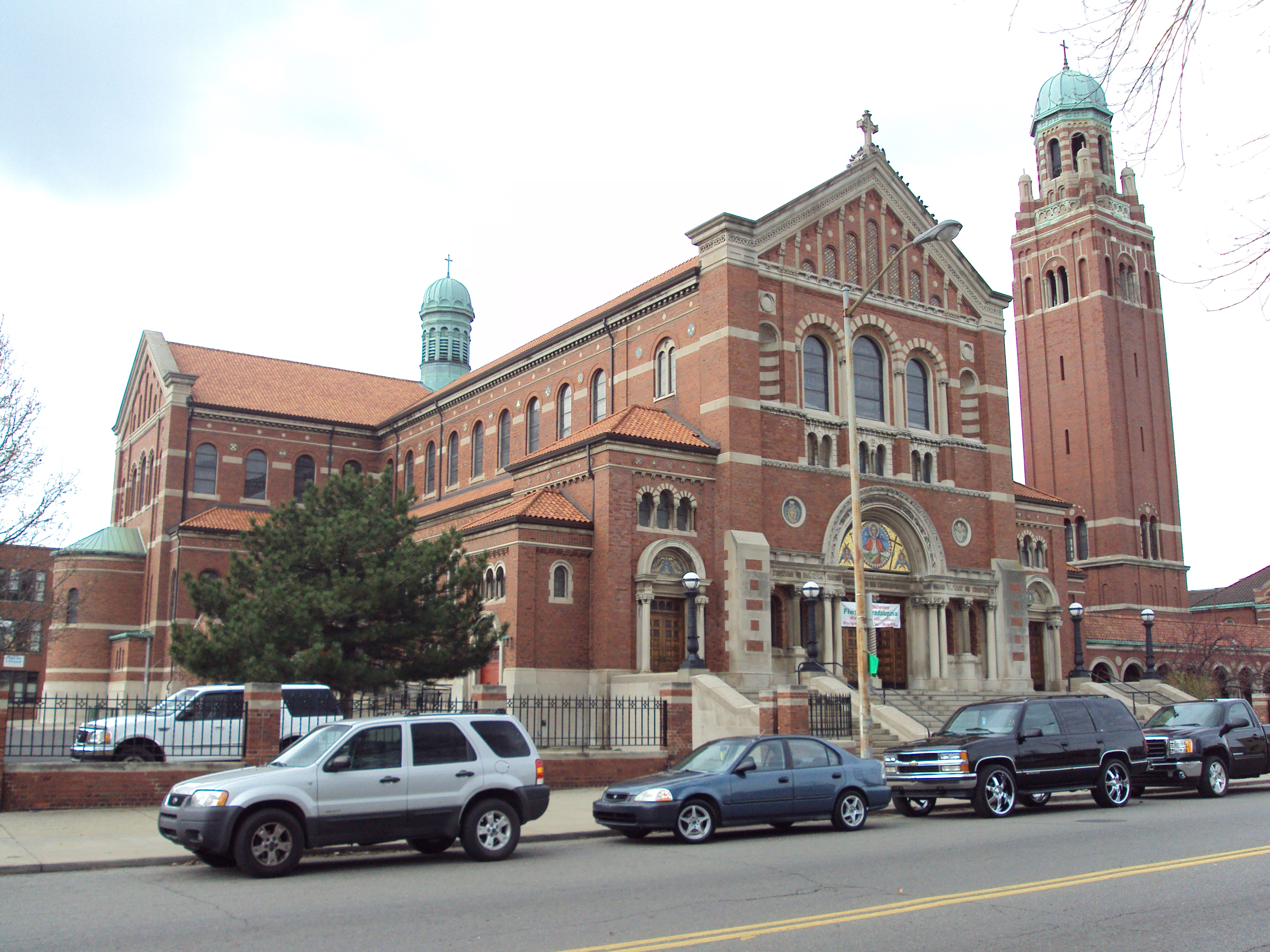
Most Holy Redeemer Church in Southwest Detroit

Mexicans and Mexican Americans began attending Holy Redeemer Catholic Church in Mexicantown in 1955. In 1955 the Primera Iglesia Bautista Mexicana ("First Baptist Mexican Church") opened and its membership was 200 families by 1960. The same congregation established a branch of the Lincoln Park Baptist Church, the Primera Iglesia Bautista del Sur (First Baptist Church of the South) that year. By 1960, the Holy Redeemer Elementary School had 200 Mexicans out of its 1,200 students. By 1961 the Holy Redeemer church had established a Spanish-language mass and it had 500 Mexican church worshipers.

As of the 1950s and 1960s other churches frequented by Mexican Americans and Mexicans included All Saints Church, Holy Cross Church in Delray, Most Holy Trinity, St. Anne's, St. Anthony, St. Boniface, St. Leo, and St. Vincent.

== Recreation and culture ==
There was a Mexican radio hour in Detroit. Javier Cardenas, a native of Guadalajara who worked for WPON, started a Spanish-language radio program which began airing in October 1952. Every Saturday and Sunday it aired for one hour each. The program switched to WPAG in January 1955. In 1958 it switched to WHRV. Cardenas began directing and producing a Sunday-only program, airing from 10:00 AM to 11:30 AM, for WQTE in 1961. In 1980 the radio program on WQTE stopped airing.

Dancing and music groups included "Club Fiesta," "Most Holy Trinity Dancing Club" and "Club Artistico Pemamino". At that time there were no sporting clubs.

The Alamo Theater, the first Spanish language movie theater, opened in 1961.

== See also ==
- Demographics of Metro Detroit
