= Lawndale =

Lawndale may refer to:

== Places ==
In the United States

- Lawndale, California, a city in Los Angeles County
- Lawndale, San Mateo County, California, former name of the town of Colma
- In Florida
  - Lawndale, the name for the H. S. Williams House
- In Illinois
  - Lawndale, Logan County, Illinois, an unincorporated community
  - Lawndale Township, McLean County, Illinois
  - Several places in Chicago, Illinois
    - North Lawndale, Chicago
    - South Lawndale, Chicago
- In Michigan
  - Lawndale, Kalamazoo County, Michigan, an unincorporated community in Comstock Township
  - Lawndale, Saginaw County, Michigan, an unincorporated community in Saginaw Charter Township
- Lawndale, North Carolina, a town in Cleveland County
- Lawndale, Philadelphia, Pennsylvania, a neighborhood in northeast Philadelphia

In fiction

- Lawndale (Daria), the fictional setting for the MTV cartoon series Daria

== Music ==
- Lawndale (band), an instrumental surf rock band on SST Records

== See also ==
- West Vernor-Lawndale Historic District in Detroit, Michigan
