= Sidney D. Miller Middle School =

- Sidney D. Miller Junior High and High School
- U.S. National Register of Historic Places
- Michigan State Historic Site
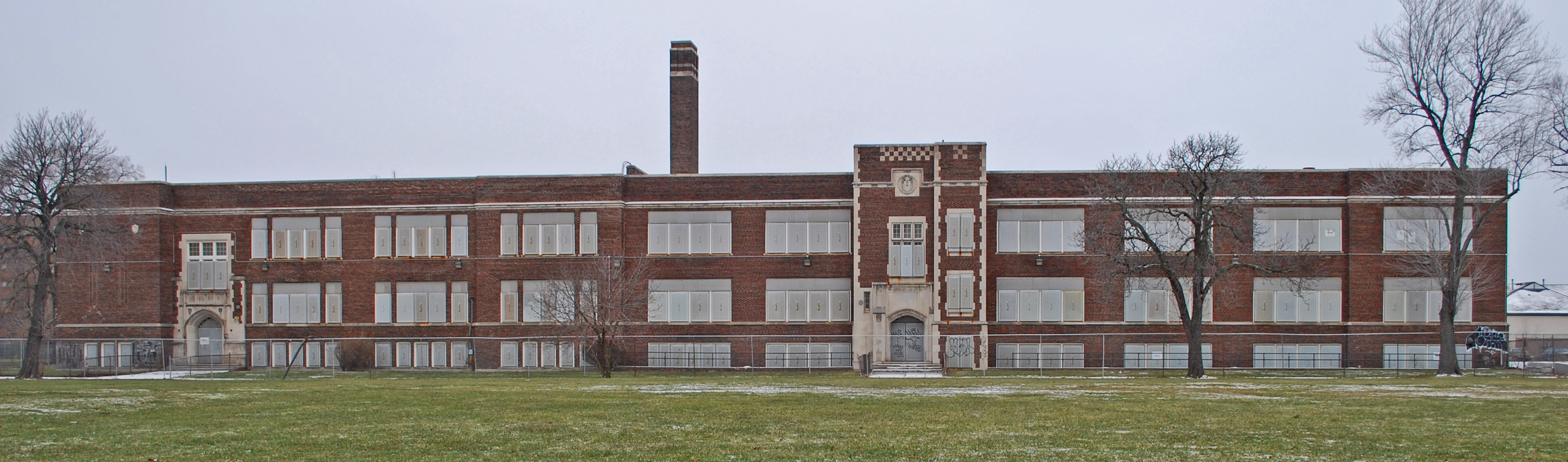
- Southern façade
- Interactive map showing building location
- Location: 2322 DuBois Street; Detroit, Michigan
- Coordinates: 42°20′54″N 83°1′54″W
- Area: 2.5 acres (1.0 ha)
- Built: 1922
- Architect: Malcomson and Higginbotham
- Architectural style: Jacobethan
- MPS: Public Schools of Detroit MPS
- NRHP reference No.: 10000689

Significant dates
- Added to NRHP: December 12, 2011
- Designated MSHS: December 5, 1986

The Sidney D. Miller Middle School, also known as the Sidney D. Miller Junior High and High School, is a school building located at 2322 DuBois Street in Detroit, Michigan. It served as a high school from 1933 to 1957, and was significant as the de facto high school serving African American students in Detroit. It was designated a state of Michigan Historic Site in 1986 and was listed on the National Register of Historic Places in 2011.

== History ==
Detroit experienced a phenomenal increase in population of almost 700,000 people during the 1910s. To accommodate the influx of residents and their children, numerous schools were built during the decade. Ground was broken for what was then called the "Dubois School" in 1918; the school was intended to serve as a junior high. The school was designed by the architectural firm of Malcomson and Higginbotham, the architects of nearly all Detroit Public Schools in the period 1894 to 1923, and constructed at a cost on $245,616. In 1919, the still unfinished building was renamed the "Sidney D. Miller Intermediate School". Sidney D. Miller (1830–1904) was a former president of the Detroit Board of Education, as well as of the Detroit Health Commission and Police Commission. However, construction plans were changed several times, and the school was not opened to students until 1921. The building itself was finally completed in 1922.

During the 1920s, the city's population continued to grow, stretching the capacity of the school system. An addition to Miller, including a girl's gymnasium, was completed in 1931. Although the area around the school was predominantly white when the building opened, the percentage of African Americans in the Black Bottom neighborhood increased so that soon it was predominantly black. Parents of white students at nearby Eastern High School complained about the rising Black student population, and in response the Detroit School Board converted Miller to a senior high school in 1933. A liberal school transfer policy allowed white students zoned to Miller to attend Eastern, which left Miller as the de facto, if not de jure, African-American High school.

The school is significant in part because of its association with the education of African American students, beginning in 1933. From 1933 to 1957, it served as the main, but unofficial, secondary school for black students. Due in part to concerns from the black community, the School Board installed a number of Black teachers and administrators at Miller. However, in 1955, steps were taken to end the de facto segregation of the Detroit School system, and in 1957 the building was converted back into a middle school. It remained a middle school for 50 years and was closed in 2007.

In the early 2010s the building was repurposed and reopened as University Prep Science and Math Elementary School, which it continues to operate as to today.

== Athletics ==
Miller High School met Detroit St. Joseph High School in 1947 at Detroit's Olympia Stadium in what became the first City Basketball Championship game in Detroit PSL and Catholic High School League history. Miller won that game 47 to 34 before a Michigan high school record attendance of 11,563.

== Description ==
The Miller School is a 2-1/2 story Jacobethan building with a flat roof, built of red brick with limestone beltcourses. The front (west) and rear façades are asymmetrical, with three-story projecting bays. The entrance is through a Gothic arch flanked by piers; the words "SYDNEY D. MILLER JUNIOR HIGH SCHOOL AD 1919" are carved above the entrance. The original 1921 building occupies an L-shaped footprint. Later additions in 1931 and 1951 extended the building further east and enclosed a small courtyard within the building, making the perimeter nearly rectangular.
