= Bill Chmielewski =

American basketball player

Personal information
- Born: December 12, 1941 (age 84) Detroit, Michigan, U.S.
- Listed height: 6 ft 10 in (2.08 m)
- Listed weight: 240 lb (109 kg)

Career information
- High school: Holy Redeemer (Detroit, Michigan)
- College: Dayton (1961–1962)
- NBA draft: 1964: 2nd round, 15th overall pick
- Drafted by: Cincinnati Royals
- Position: Center

Career history
- 1962: Trenton Colonials
- 1962–1963: Philadelphia Tapers
- 1964–1965: Muskogan Panthers
- 1966–1967: Battle Creek Braves

Career highlights
- NIT champion (1962); NIT MVP (1962); Fourth-team Parade All-American (1960)
- Stats at Basketball Reference

William Chmielewski (born December 12, 1941) is an American former professional basketball player. He was born in Detroit, Michigan and attended Holy Redeemer High School, graduating in 1960. As a senior he helped Holy Redeemer capture the Class B state basketball championship. Chmielewski then played basketball at the University of Dayton.

== Career ==
Chmielewski, who stood 6'10", won the National Invitation Tournament in 1962 with the University of Dayton, and was named MVP of the tournament. He left college after one season to get married, and signed with the Philadelphia Tapers in the American Basketball League. In 1964, he was selected in the NBA draft by the Cincinnati Royals, but has never played in the NBA.

In 1964–1965 he played for the Muskogan Panthers. In 1966–1967 he played for the Battle Creek Braves. Both teams were in the North American Basketball League
