= Mexicantown, Detroit =

Neighborhood in Detroit, Michigan, USA

Coordinates: 42°19′N 83°6′W

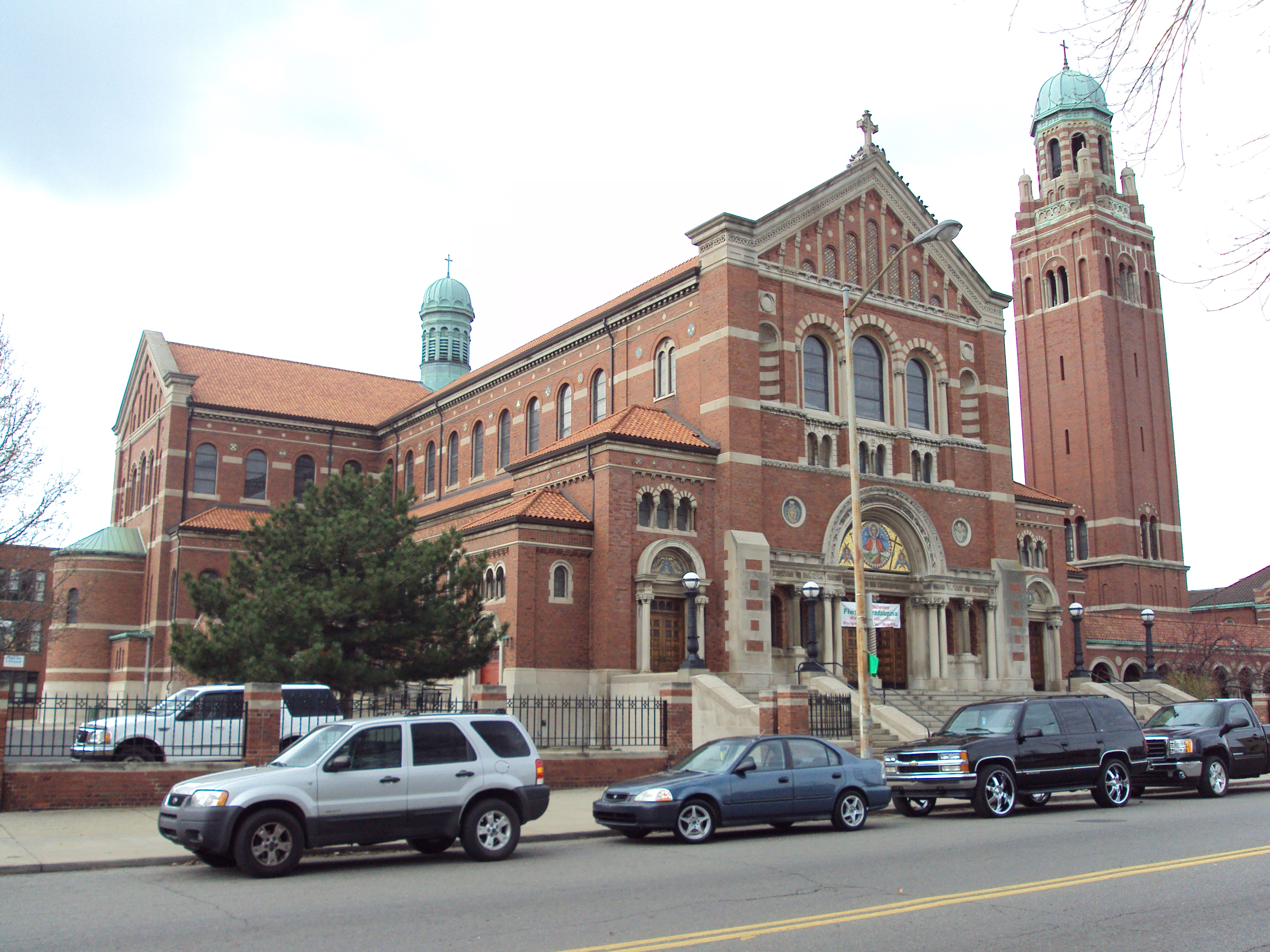
Most Holy Redeemer Church in Southwest Detroit

Mexicantown is a neighborhood located in Detroit, Michigan, United States.

Andrew Eckhous, a columnist for the Michigan Daily, said that Mexicantown was "one of Detroit’s most vibrant communities". John Gallagher of the Detroit Free Press said that the commercial activity on West Vernor in Mexicantown is an example of what the Detroit Future City report suggested as something to replicate throughout the city.

== History ==
Detroit's Mexican population began settling in Mexicantown in the 1920s. The Mexican community established itself on Vernor Street. The community was originally known as "La Bagley". The Holy Redeemer Roman Catholic Church began holding weekly masses in Spanish by 1969. At one point, the Lithuanian Hall building was renamed the Hispanos Unidos Hall. Waves of immigration came in the 1970s and 1980s, adding to the community. In the late 1980s, the neighborhood was christened "Mexicantown" as part of a public relations campaign. A wave of immigration from Mexico in the 1990s greatly increased the number of Mexicans in Detroit. In one period, Mexicantown's population increased with seasonal immigrations of about 2,000 people, while Detroit as a whole had population decreases. Benedict Carey of The New York Times said that Mexicantown was "on the rise" in 2005.

In December 2012, Ford Motor Company announced that it would open the Ford Resource and Engagement Center in the Mexicantown Mercado facility and spend $10 million to finance the operations of the center. Prior to the Ford center opening, the building was closed.

== Composition ==
The main thoroughfares are Bagley Street and Vernor Street. Meghan McEwen of Model D said, "Nebulous are the borders of Mexicantown" and that "Some say it begins at the old train station and ends at Clark Park. Others passionately insist it includes Clark Park. More than a few people expand its spread all the way to Livernois." Vince Murray, the executive director of Vince Murray, argued that the community could include Springwells Avenue and that the name "Mexicantown" may be too limiting. McEwen said "Perhaps even more important to defining the neighborhood, though, are its enviously unique traits and robust character, attracting visitors, as well as residents, from all over the state and even Canada." McEwen also said, "Mexicantown is a place where vibrantly colored buildings, decorated with even brighter murals and hand-painted signs, dot" Bagley and Vernor. As of 2011, there are many restaurants at the intersection of Interstate 75 and Vernor that cater to customers from the suburbs. Mcewen said, "One might guess there are more restaurants per square foot than any other neighborhood in Detroit."

== Education ==
The neighborhood is in the Detroit school district and is served by Western International High School.

Elementary-middle schools:

- Amelia Earhart Elementary-Middle School

The Cesar Chavez Academy charter school has area campuses.

The area Roman Catholic Archdiocese of Detroit schools are Holy Redeemer School, a grade school, and the Detroit Cristo Rey High School, which is on the site of the former Holy Redeemer High School.

The Detroit Public Library Bowen Branch is in Mexicantown. It was named after a Detroit Library Commission member Herbert Bowen. It opened on December 28, 1912.

== In media ==
A documentary called A Journey to Mexico was created, highlighting travels of people from two Mexican towns to the Mexicantown area of Detroit.

In the game Deus Ex: Human Revolution, the protagonist Adam Jensen was fired from Detroit PD's SWAT after an incident that took place in Mexicantown.

A documentary by Troy Anderson called Clark Park: A Detroit Story, released in 2017, tells the story of the Southwest Detroit community that saved a hockey rink, helped stabilize a neighborhood, and gave inner city youth the opportunity to play the game of hockey. This short documentary with a run time of 34 minutes is told through the perspectives of seven southwest Detroiters ranging from 12 to 87 years of age.

== Notable residents ==
- Todd Cruz - Baseball player
- Jack White - Musician

== See also ==
- History of the Mexican Americans in Metro Detroit
