= East Lincoln Township, Logan County, Illinois =

Coordinates: 40°10′52″N 89°18′45″W

East Lincoln Township
- Township
- Location in Logan County

- Logan County's location in Illinois
- Country: United States
- State: Illinois
- County: Logan
- Established: November 7, 1865

Area
  - Total: 36.09 sq mi (93.5 km^{2})
  - Land: 36.05 sq mi (93.4 km^{2})
  - Water: 0.04 sq mi (0.10 km^{2}) 0.12%

Population (2020)
  - Total: 7,736
  - Density: 214.6/sq mi (82.85/km^{2})
- Time zone: UTC-6 (CST)
  - Summer (DST): UTC-5 (CDT)
- FIPS code: 17-107-21982

East Lincoln Township is located in Logan County, Illinois. As of the 2020 census, its population was 7,736 and it contained 3,634 housing units.

== Geography ==
According to the 2021 census gazetteer files, East Lincoln Township has a total area of 36.09 square miles (93.47 km^{2}), of which 36.05 square miles (93.37 km^{2}) (or 99.88%) is land and 0.04 square miles (0.10 km^{2}) (or 0.12%) is water.

=== Cities, Towns, Villages ===
- Lincoln (east half)

=== Unincorporated Towns ===
- Lawndale
- Skelton (west half)

== Demographics ==
Historical population
Census	Pop.	Note	%±
2000	9,209		—
2010	8,813		−4.3%
2020	7,736		−12.2%
U.S. Decennial Census

As of the 2020 census there were 7,736 people, 3,290 households, and 1,910 families residing in the township. The population density was 214.36 inhabitants per square mile (82.76/km^{2}). There were 3,634 housing units at an average density of 100.70 per square mile (38.88/km^{2}). The racial makeup of the township was 89.81% White, 2.99% African American, 0.13% Native American, 1.16% Asian, 0.00% Pacific Islander, 1.05% from other races, and 4.86% from two or more races. Hispanic or Latino of any race were 2.77% of the population.

There were 3,290 households, out of which 23.30% had children under the age of 18 living with them, 44.92% were married couples living together, 8.27% had a female householder with no spouse present, and 41.95% were non-families. 32.80% of all households were made up of individuals, and 17.30% had someone living alone who was 65 years of age or older. The average household size was 2.20 and the average family size was 2.85.

According to the 2020 American Community Survey, township's age distribution consisted of 17.8% under the age of 18, 18.6% from 18 to 24, 21.1% from 25 to 44, 23.7% from 45 to 64, and 18.6% who were 65 years of age or older. The median age was 35.7 years. For every 100 females, there were 94.8 males. For every 100 females age 18 and over, there were 93 males.

The median income for a household in the township was $53,730, and the median income for a family was $75,087. Males had a median income of $34,167 versus $20,787 for females. The per capita income for the township was $30,554. About 7.1% of families and 14.2% of the population were below the poverty line, including 25.5% of those under age 18 and 6.5% of those age 65 or over.
