= Most Holy Redeemer Church (Detroit) =

Historic church in Michigan, United States

- U.S. Historic district – Contributing property
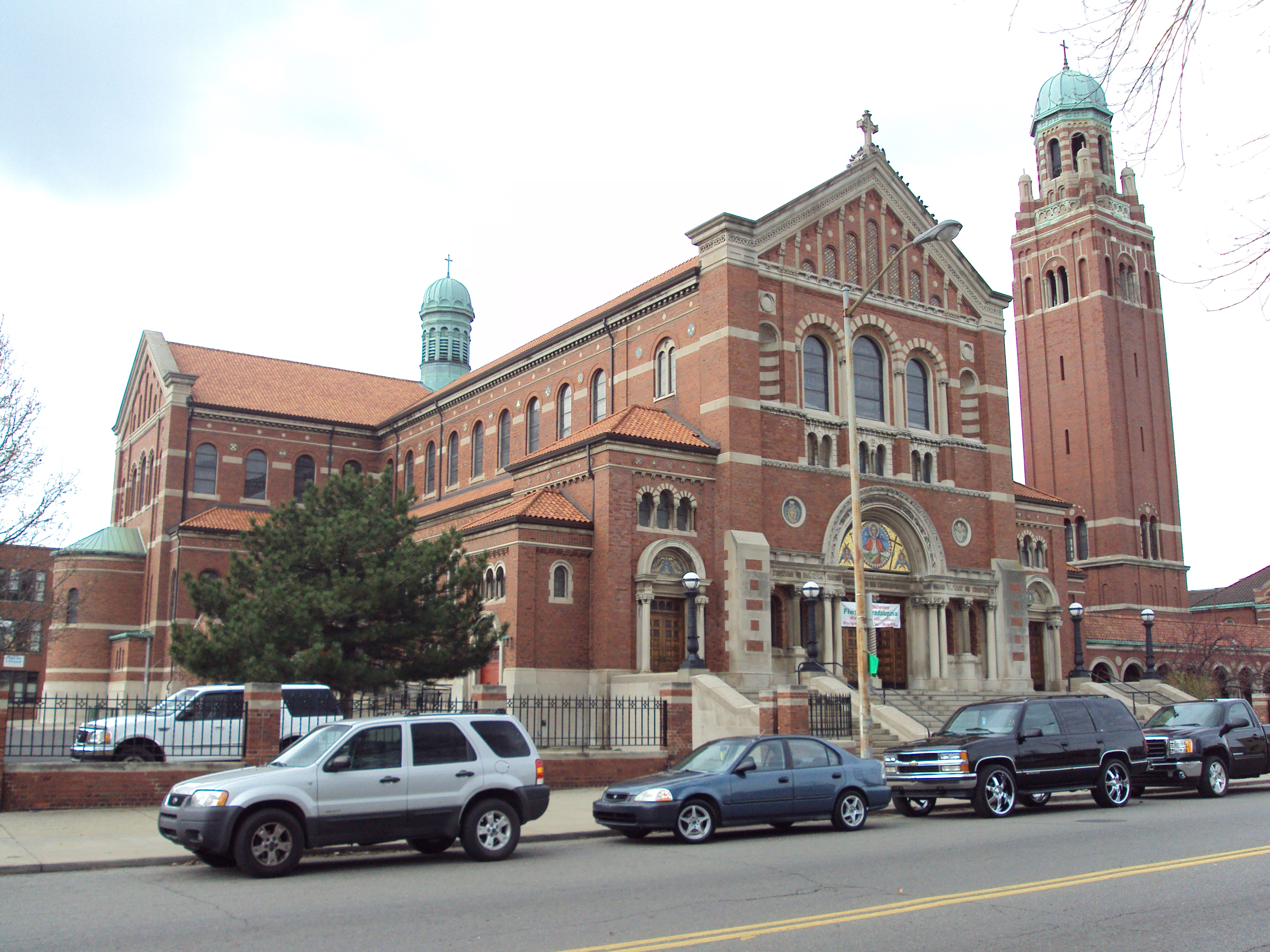
- Location: 1721 Junction Street; Detroit, Michigan
- Coordinates: 42°19′2″N 83°6′7″W
- Built: 1921
- Architect: Donaldson and Meier
- Architectural style: Renaissance Revival
- Part of: West Vernor–Junction Historic District (ID02001503)
- MPS: West Vernor Highway Survey Area, Detroit, Michigan MPS
- Added to NRHP: December 12, 2002

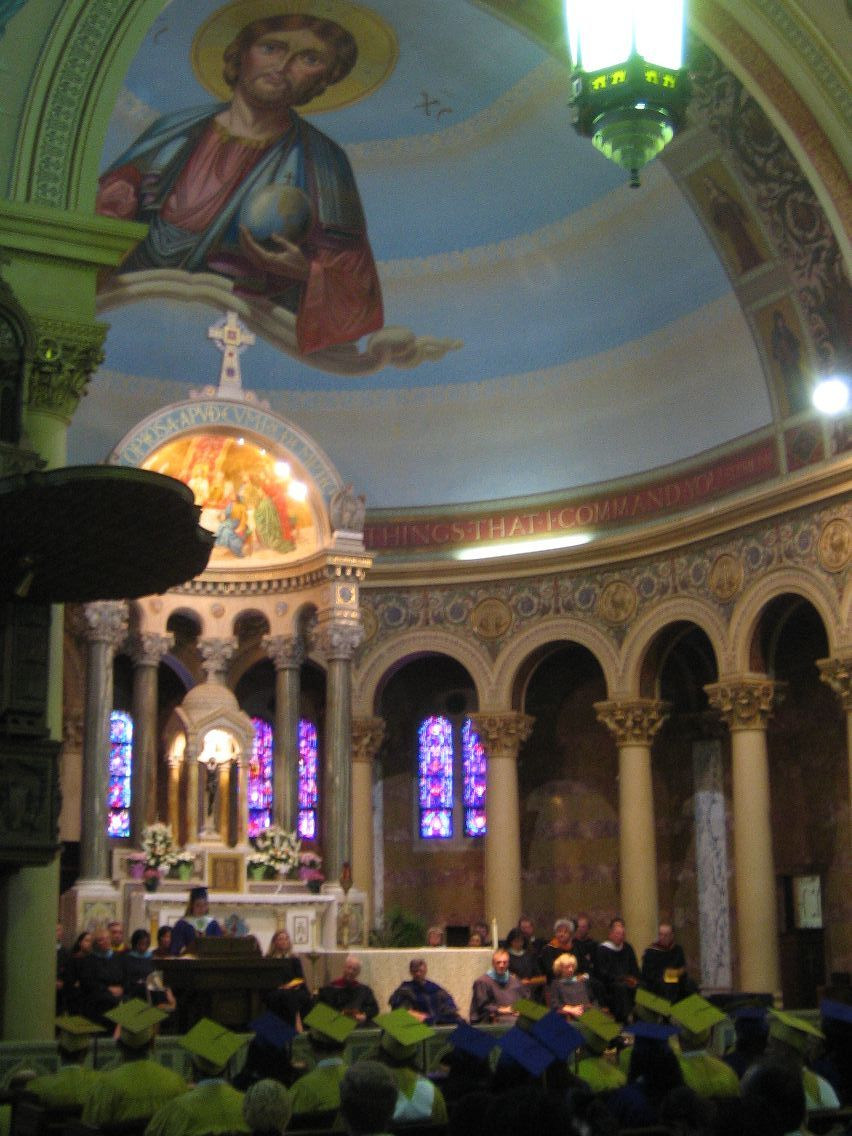
Most Holy Redeemer Church Sanctuary

The Most Holy Redeemer Church is located at 1721 Junction Street in Southwest Detroit, Michigan, within the West Vernor–Junction Historic District. The church was once estimated as the largest Roman Catholic parish in North America. West Vernor–Junction Historic District is adjacent to Mexicantown and contains a growing Mexican community and resurgent neighborhood.

== History ==
The parish was founded in 1880 by Redemptorist father Aegidius Smulders, a former chaplain in the Confederate army. Initially the parish served a congregation predominantly of Irish immigrants, many of whom worked in the tobacco factories. Services were held at first, above Patrick Ratigan's general store on West Jefferson Avenue and later in what was then known as Paddy McMahon's Saloon. Church services were held on the first floor, while the second served as a residence for priests. The first church building, a wood-frame structure designed by Redemptorist Brother Thomas, and known as the Little Church on Sand Hill, was dedicated in 1881. A second larger Gothic style church was built in 1896 during the tenure of pastor Benedict Neithart.

As Irish and German residents moved to the suburbs, people of Latin American descent from the Corktown area of Detroit took their place. A mass in Spanish was instituted in 1960. In 1999, The Redemptorists turned the parish over to the Archdiocese of Detroit. The parish school was started by the Sisters of the Immaculate Heart of Mary in 1882. Sisters of the Society of Our Lady of the Most Holy Trinity (SOLT) arrived at Most Holy Redeemer Parish in August 2017 to work in the school and serve the parish. SOLT Seminarians are also in residence at the parish, studying at the nearby Sacred Heart Major Seminary.

== Architecture ==
Built in 1921, the present church was dedicated on April 1, 1923. Designed by the firm of Donaldson and Meier, it was constructed in the Roman basilica style with a Romanesque façade. The church seats about 1,400. A campanile was constructed around 1924 in memory of parishioners who died in World War I.

The stained glass double lancet aisle windows were designed by Charles Jay Connick. Those in the south aisle depict the parables of Jesus, those on the north side, the miracles. The clerestory windows are by the Detroit Stained Glass Works, the roof is covered with Ludowici tile, and the building features a Pewabic mosaic floor tile designed by Mary Chase Perry Stratton.

== Description ==
The parish contains a longstanding elementary school, along with the Detroit Cristo Rey High School, which has operated since 2008 inside of the building of the former Holy Redeemer High School.

As in the other Southwest Detroit neighborhoods, such as Springwells Village, West Vernor Highway is the main commercial thoroughfare. Churches, parks, recreation centers, and theaters anchor neighborhoods such as the West Vernor-Junction intersection that Holy Redeemer parish dominates.

== In popular culture ==
The Hollywood movie The Rosary Murders (1987), starring actors Donald Sutherland and Charles Durning, prominently featured the church and the neighborhood. Jack White, later of The White Stripes and formerly an altar boy himself at Most Holy Redeemer, appeared uncredited as an altar boy.

== See also ==
- Architecture of metropolitan Detroit
- Roman Catholic Archdiocese of Detroit
