= West Vernor–Junction Historic District =

Historic district in Michigan, United States

- U.S. National Register of Historic Places
- U.S. Historic district
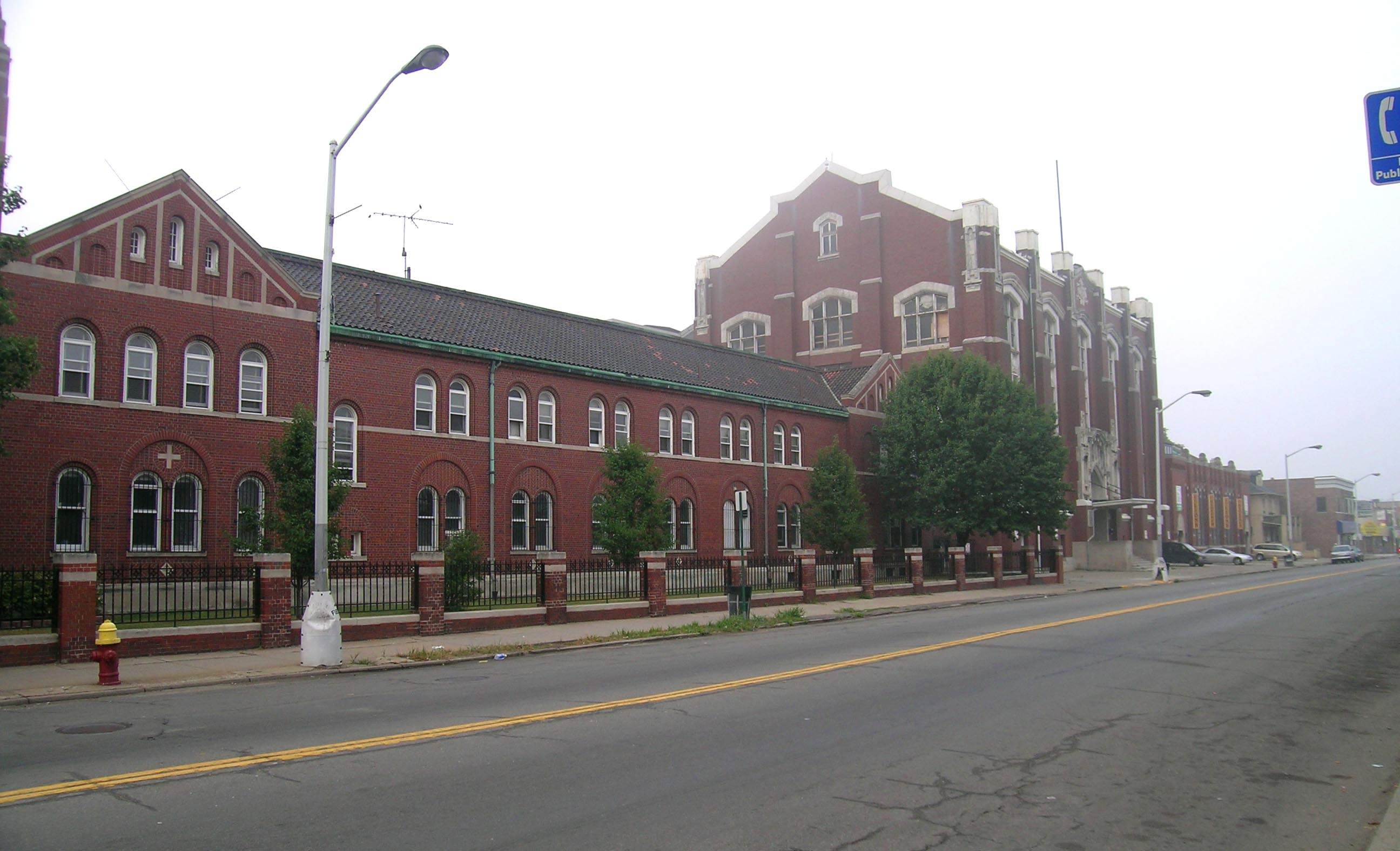
- South side of Vernor at Junction, looking southwest, along the boundary of Holy Redeemer parish.
- Interactive map
- Location: Detroit, Michigan, U.S.
- Coordinates: 42°19′2″N 83°6′7″W
- Architect: Donaldson and Meier; Jogerst, Joseph P.; et al.
- Architectural style: Late Victorian, Romanesque, Art Deco, Early Commercial
- MPS: West Vernor Highway Survey Area, Detroit, Michigan MPS
- NRHP reference No.: 02001503
- Added to NRHP: December 12, 2002

West Vernor–Junction Historic District is a commercial historic district located along West Vernor Highway between Lansing and Cavalry in Detroit, Michigan. The district includes 160 acres (0.65 km^{2}) and 44 buildings. The district was listed on the National Register of Historic Places in 2002.

== History ==
During the 1860s and 1870s the area that is now the West Vernor–Junction Historic District was a quiet farming community. However, in the 1880s the farmland began to be divided for residential occupation. By 1881, a wood frame Catholic church (which later developed into the Most Holy Redeemer Church) was in place on the corner of what now is Vernor and Junction. A number of wood frame commercial buildings (some still extant) were built along Vernor in the 1880s and 1890s, as well as a few early brick commercial buildings. More brick commercial buildings were constructed in the 1910s and 1920s when the nearby Ford River Rouge Complex was constructed, leading to a boom in the neighborhood.

Many Lithuanians settled in Detroit during the World War II era, especially on the city's Southwest side in the West Vernor area where the renovated Lithuanian Hall reopened in 2006. St. Anthony's parish at 1750 25th Street became a predominantly attended by Lithuanian immigrants and continued to hold services in Lithuanian until its closure in 2013.

== Description ==
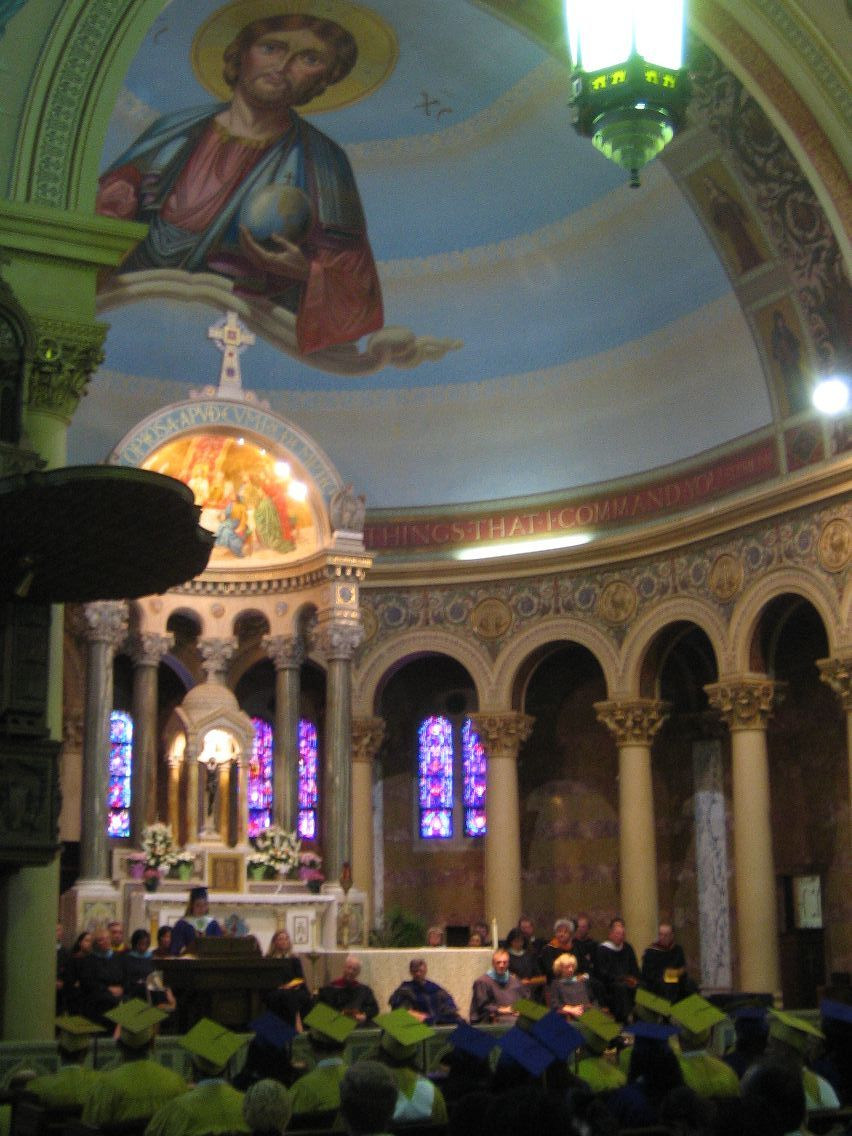
Most Holy Redeemer Church Sanctuary

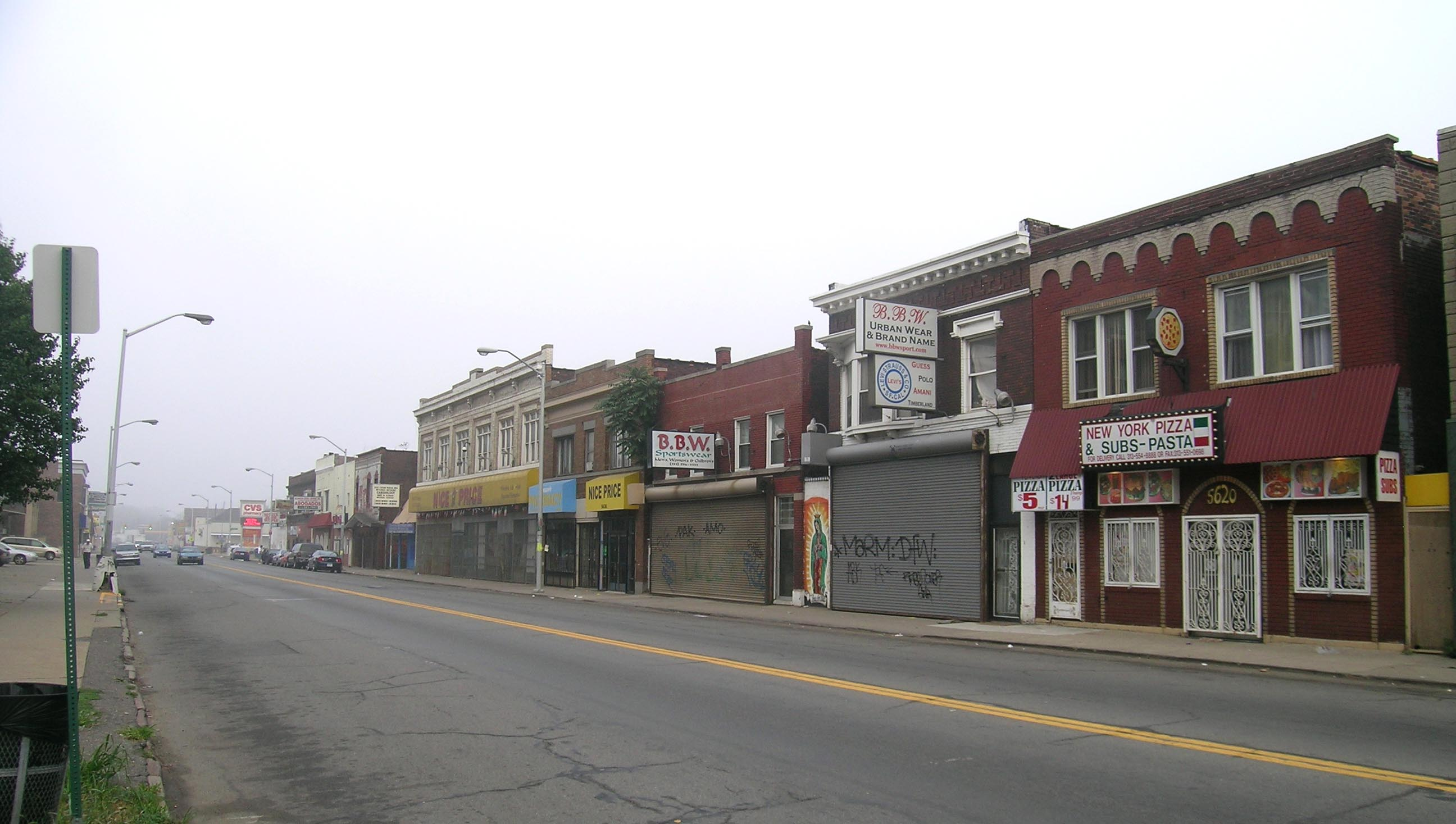
North side of Vernor at Junction, looking west

The West Vernor–Junction Historic District is adjacent to Mexicantown and contains a large vibrant Latino community and resurgent neighborhoods. The commercial district contains one of the few concentrations of early wood frame commercial buildings in the city of Detroit, and is one of the few neighborhood commercial districts to survive through Detroit's economic problems.

The district is primarily composed of two-story wood frame and brick commercial buildings. The buildings east of Junction are in general older, with some structures dating to the 1890s, while the blocks west of Junction date primarily to the 1900s and 1910s. Significant structures include the 600-seat Stratford Theatre at 4751 W. Vernor Hwy., designed by Joseph P. Jogerst, which seated 1,137 when it opened in 1916. The Art Deco-styled Stratford has operated as a retail store since 1985. The nearby Brown's Bun Bakery, with a white enameled metal panel facade, is an excellent example of Art Deco style.

The district also includes the historic Most Holy Redeemer Church, designed by architects Donaldson and Meier, which was once estimated as the largest Catholic parish in North America, and is physically one of the largest parish complexes in the state of Michigan. The complex contains the 1923 Neo-Romanesque church and monastery, a Late Gothic Revival auditorium, the 1901 elementary school building, the 1928 high school and gymnasium (now operating as Detroit Cristo-Rey), and the 1939 convent building. Most of these buildings were designed by the firm of Donaldson and Meier. The church still serves the local community.

== In Culture ==
A Hollywood movie, The Rosary Murders (1987), starring actor Donald Sutherland prominently featured the neighborhood.

== See also ==
- West Vernor-Lawndale Historic District
- West Vernor-Springwells Historic District
