= West Vernor–Springwells Historic District =

Historic district in Michigan, United States

- Springwells Village
- U.S. National Register of Historic Places
- U.S. Historic district
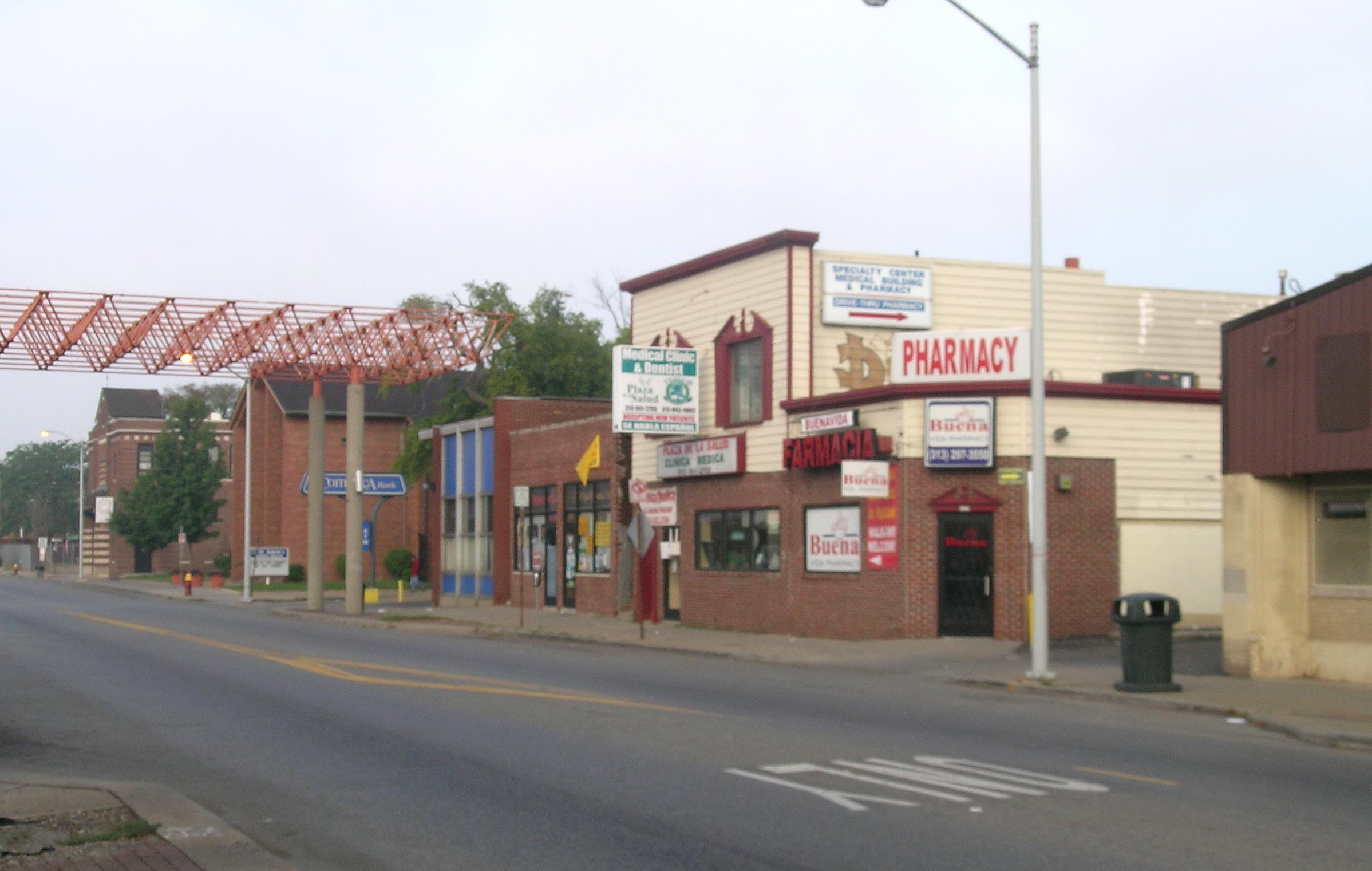
- North side of Vernor at Springwells, looking west.
- Interactive map
- Location: W. Vernor Hwy, vet. Honorah and Norman, Detroit, Michigan
- Coordinates: 42°18′44″N 83°7′35″W
- Area: 8 acres (3.2 ha)
- Architect: Oscar C. Gottesleben, Diehl & Diehl
- Architectural style: Early Commercial, International Style
- MPS: West Vernor Highway Survey Area, Detroit, Michigan MPS
- NRHP reference No.: 02001502
- Added to NRHP: December 12, 2002

The West Vernor–Springwells Historic District is a six block long commercial historic district located along West Vernor Highway between Honorah and Norman in Detroit, Michigan. The district includes 80 acres (32 ha) and 28 buildings. It was listed on the National Register of Historic Places in 2002.

== History ==
In the late 19th century, the area around this historic district was a small farming community. However, as Detroit expanded and industry moved into the area in the late 1880s, the farms began to be subdivided. Shortly thereafter, a few frame commercial buildings were erected along what is now Vernor Highway. In the 1910s and 1920s, the neighborhood grew rapidly as a result of the construction of the nearby Ford River Rouge Complex. At that time, a substantial number of brick commercial buildings were constructed along Vernor.

In 1915, in response to the growing population of primarily German immigrants, the Roman Catholic Archdiocese of Detroit established St. Gabriel's Church (located at Vernor and Norman). The Vernor/Springwells commercial district continued to grow through the 1920s and into the 1930s. In the 1950s, African Americans began moving into the neighborhood, and the 1980s saw an influx of Hispanic residents.

== Description ==
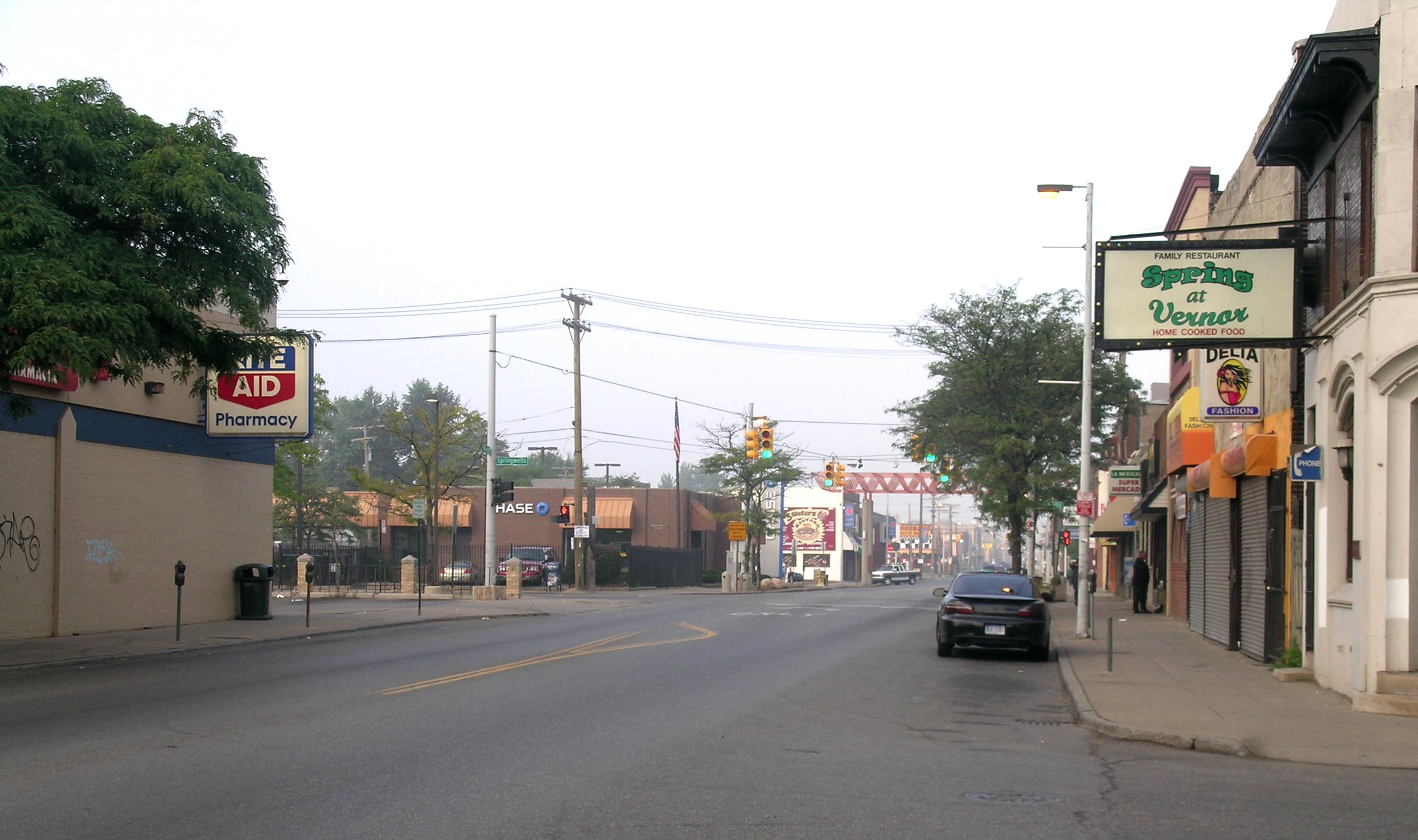
South side of Vernor at Springwells, looking west

The West Vernor–Springwells Historic District spans six blocks along West Vernor, centered on the West Vernor/Springwells intersection, but also containing the West Vernor/Central Avenue intersection. The district contains a high concentration of early twentieth century two-story commercial buildings. Some of these buildings are quite long, containing four to six storefronts apiece. The most visually striking structure is the former Rio theatre, designed by architect Cyril Edward Schley, at the northwest corner of West Vernor and Central Avenue

The district also the St. Gabriel's Church parish complex. This complex contains a 1916 Italian Renaissance style rectory, the original 1918 Romanesque Revival church designed by Oscar C. Gottesleben, which was later converted into the parish school, and the 1953 St. Gabriel Church designed by Diehl and Diehl. The church still serves Catholic parishioners in the neighborhood. The school operated as a Catholic school until the early 1990s, and in 1996 reopened as the Caesar Chavez Academy.

== See also ==
- Springwells, Detroit
- West Vernor-Junction Historic District
- West Vernor-Lawndale Historic District
