= Lawndale Township, McLean County, Illinois =

Coordinates: 40°37′15″N 88°37′32″W

Lawndale Township
- Township
- Location in McLean County

- McLean County's location in Illinois
- Country: United States
- State: Illinois
- County: McLean
- Established: November 3, 1857

Area
  - Total: 39.75 sq mi (103.0 km^{2})
  - Land: 39.74 sq mi (102.9 km^{2})
  - Water: 0.01 sq mi (0.026 km^{2}) 0.03%

Population (2010)
  - Estimate (2016): 156
  - Density: 4/sq mi (1.5/km^{2})
- Time zone: UTC-6 (CST)
  - Summer (DST): UTC-5 (CDT)
- FIPS code: 17-113-42353

Lawndale Township is located in McLean County, Illinois, east of Lexington, northwest of Colfax, and southeast of Chenoa. As of the 2010 census, its population was 158 and it contained 74 housing units. It's Township Road Commissioner is Jeff Winterland. Lawndale Cemetery is located on 2550 North Road. At least part of the township is within the area of the proposed Lexington Chenoa Wind Farm to be developed by Horizon Wind Energy.

== Geography ==
According to the 2010 census, the township has a total area of 39.75 square miles (103.0 km^{2}), of which 39.74 square miles (102.9 km^{2}) (or 99.97%) is land and 0.01 square miles (0.026 km^{2}) (or 0.03%) is water.

== Demographics ==
Historical population
Census	Pop.	Note	%±
2016 (est.)	156
U.S. Decennial Census
