= Lawndale, Logan County, Illinois =

Lawndale, Illinois
- Unincorporated community
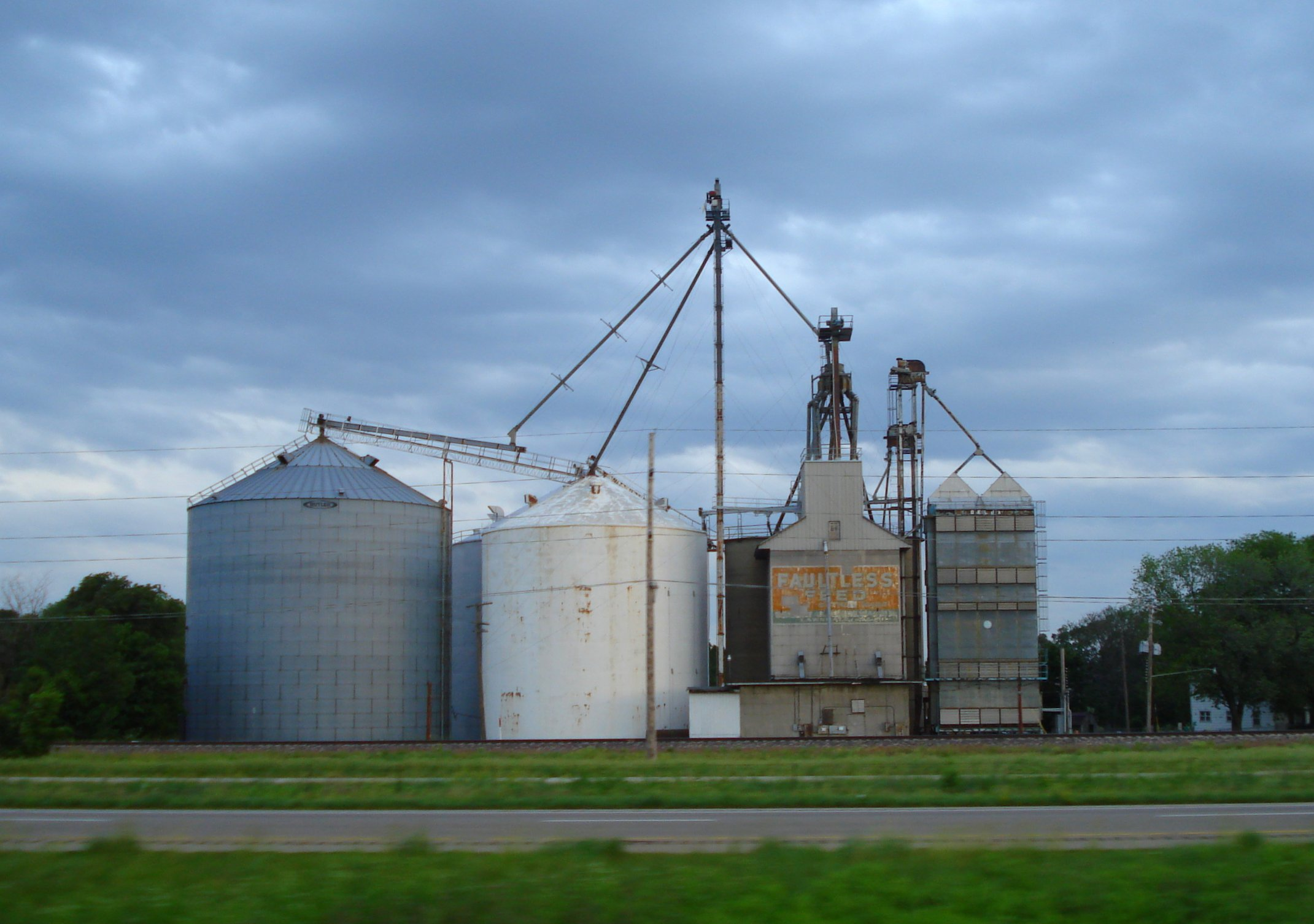
- The Lawndale grain elevator (with old "Faultless Feed" sign). It was operating until 2022 and was torn down in 2023.

- Location within Illinois Location within the United States
- Coordinates: 40°13′05″N 89°16′57″W
- Country: United States
- State: Illinois
- County: Logan
- Township: East Lincoln
- Elevation: 591 ft (180 m)
- Time zone: UTC-6 (Central (CST))
  - Summer (DST): UTC-5 (CDT)
- ZIP code: 61751
- Area code: 217
- GNIS feature ID: 411862

Lawndale is a community in Logan County, Illinois, United States which lies northeast of Springfield. The town lies on Interstate 55, part of the old Route 66, between Atlanta and Lincoln. The town lies just south of Kickapoo Creek. The town has one tavern, and a converted mobile home as its post office.

Lawndale was laid out and platted in 1854, soon after the Alton & Sangamon (now Chicago & Alton) railroad was extended to that point. A post office called Lawndale has been in operation since 1855.
