= West Vernor–Lawndale Historic District =

Historic district in Michigan, United States

- U.S. National Register of Historic Places
- U.S. Historic district
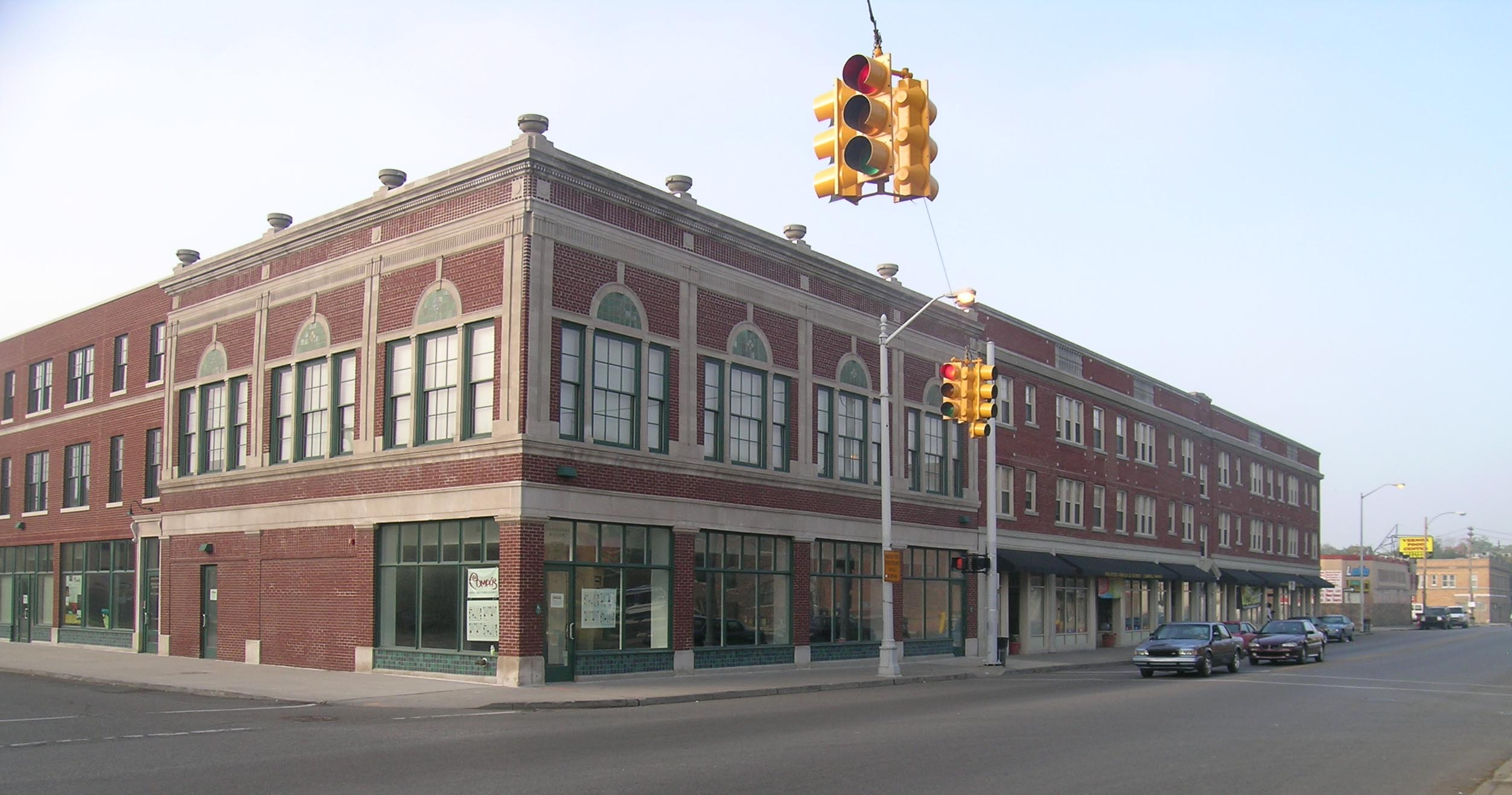
- Southwest corner at Vernor and Lawndale, looking west (Oddfellows Hall & Ferndale Apartments)
- Interactive map
- Location: Detroit, Michigan, U.S.
- Coordinates: 42°18′33″N 83°7′57″W
- Architect: Fred Swirsky
- Architectural style: Early Commercial, Colonial Revival
- MPS: West Vernor Highway Survey Area, Detroit, Michigan MPS
- NRHP reference No.: 02001501
- Added to NRHP: December 12, 2002

The West Vernor–Lawndale Historic District is a two-block commercial historic district located along West Vernor Highway between Cabot and Ferris Streets in Detroit, Michigan. The district includes 30 acres (120,000 m^{2}) and 10 buildings. It was listed on the National Register of Historic Places in 2002.

== History ==
This area around West Vernor Highway was settled by German immigrants in the 1870s, and became a small farming community. By the early 1900s, the farms began to be platted into subdivisions. A few commercial buildings were constructed during this time, but commercial development in the district rapidly increased in the 1920s after the completion of the nearby Ford River Rouge Complex and the subsequent expansion of the nearby residential districts. Most of the buildings within the district date to this time.

Development ceased during the Great Depression. Afterward, the area remained economically viable into the 1960s when the effects of the citywide population loss and disinvestment became apparent. However, the Vernor/Lawndale District retains a diverse mixture of ethnic groups, with the original German immigrants making way for a primarily African-American and Latino population.

== Description ==
The West Vemor/Lawndale District includes ten commercial and commercial/apartment buildings along West Vernor. These buildings include:

- 8547-8605 West Vernor, 1925. A two-story brick building with two storefronts below and residential apartments above.
- 8617-19 West Vernor, 1925. A two-story brick building with storefronts below and residential apartments above.
- 8623-27 West Vernor, 1916. A two-story Commercial brick building with storefronts below and residential apartments above.
- 8633 West Vernor, 1925. A two-story brick building with storefronts below and residential apartments above.
- 8634-40 West Vernor, (Weisburg Building) 1926. A large three-story Georgian Revival brick building which originally had three storefronts below and 18 apartments above.
- 8701-11 West Vernor, (Odd Fellows Hall) 1917. An Adamesque two-story brick structure, designed by Fred Swirsky, with a storefront below and public hall space upstairs.
- 8710 West Vernor, (People's State Bank) 1919. A Neoclassical single-story temple front brick commercial building.
- 8715-41 West Vernor, (Ferndale Apartments) 1923. A large three-story Georgian Revival brick building built in an H shape, with storefronts below, and apartments on the two upper levels. This building contains the Detroit Public Library Campbell branch.
- 8734-36 West Vernor, 1915. A two-story brick building with storefronts below and residential apartments above.
- 8740-48 West Vernor (Cabot Apartments), 1926. A three-story Georgian Revival brick building with flat roof capped with stone. Apartments are located above street level storefronts.

== Gallery ==
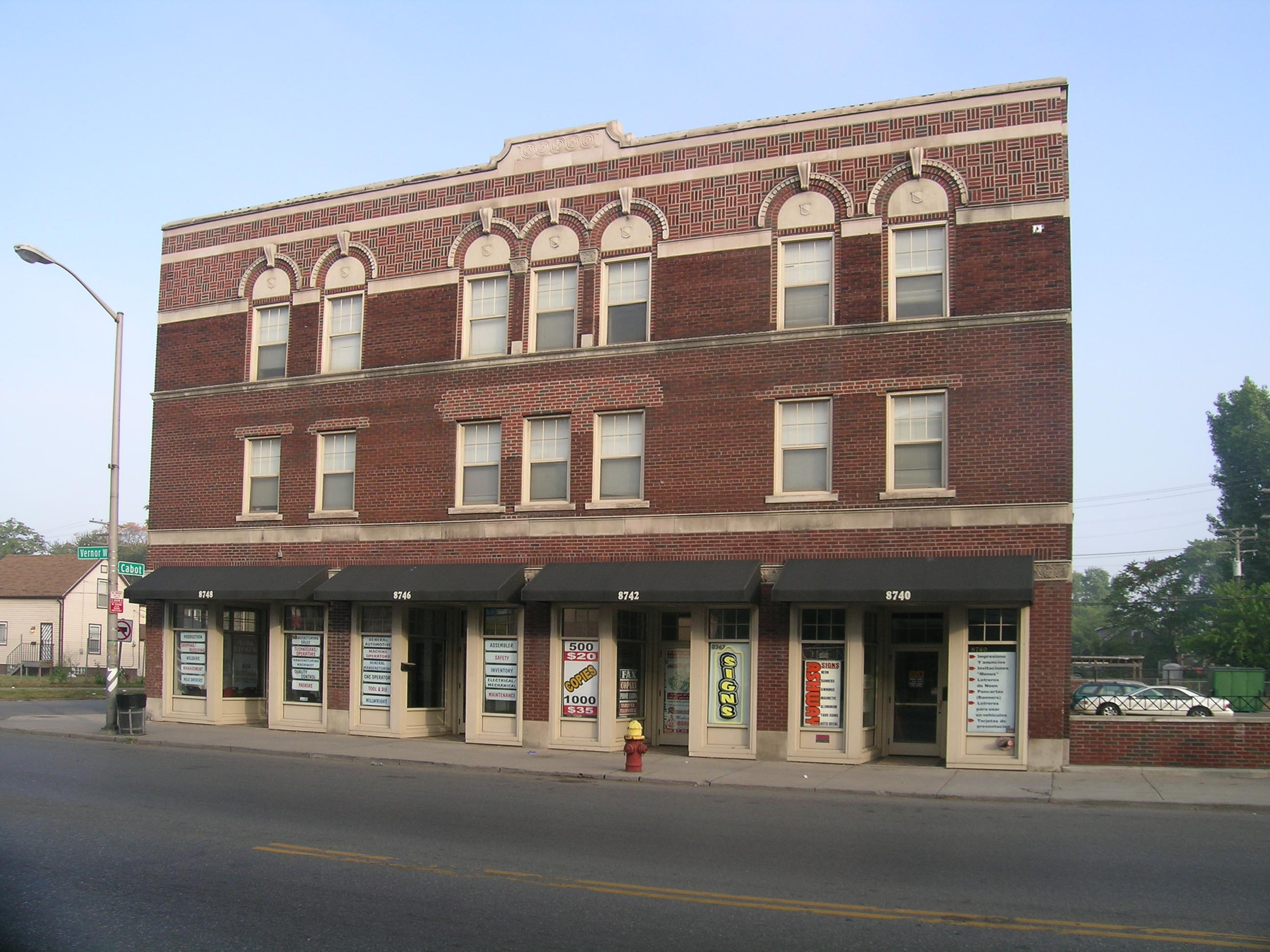
Cabot Apartments, north side of Vernor at Cabot

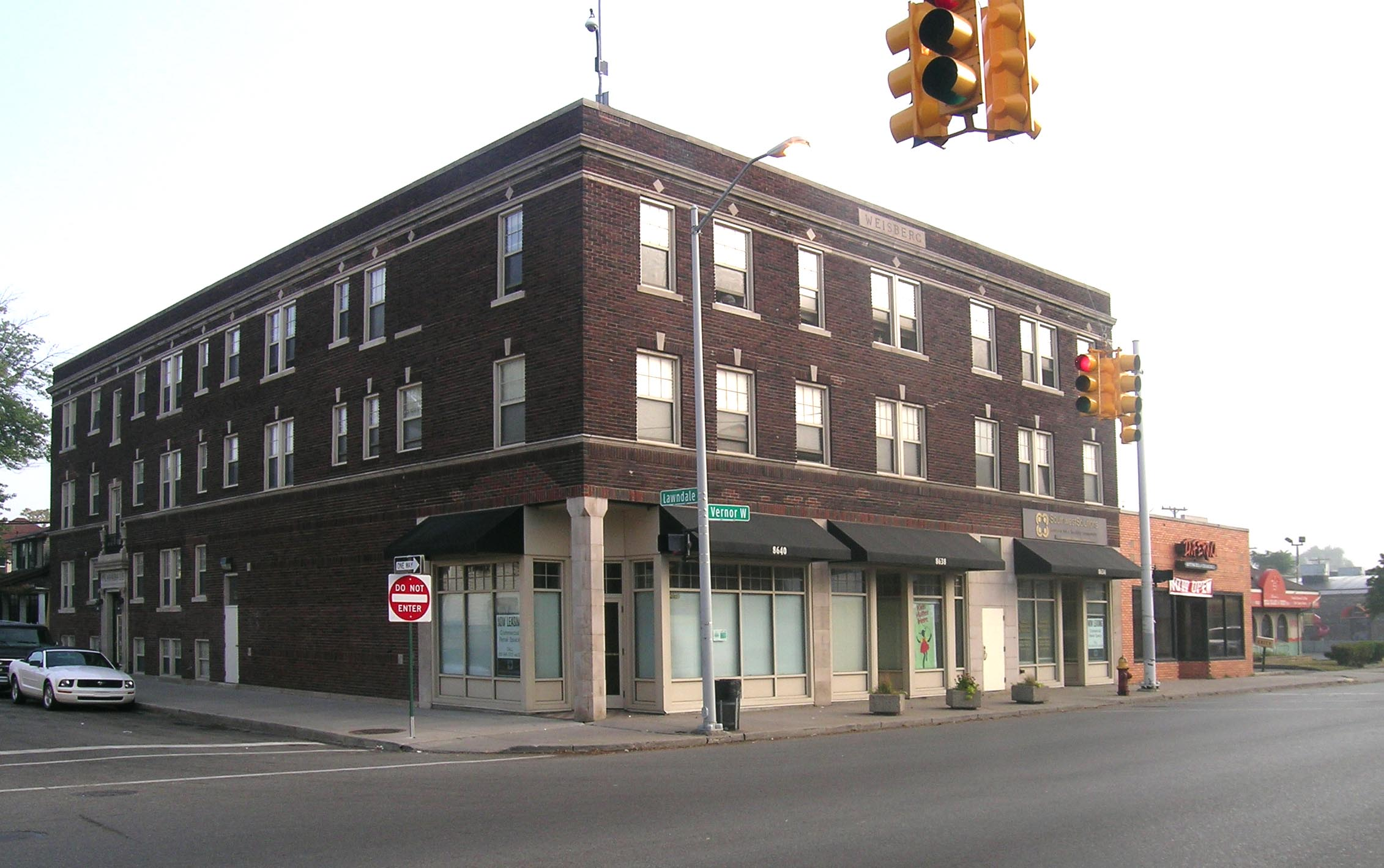
Weisberg Building; north side of Vernor at Lawndale

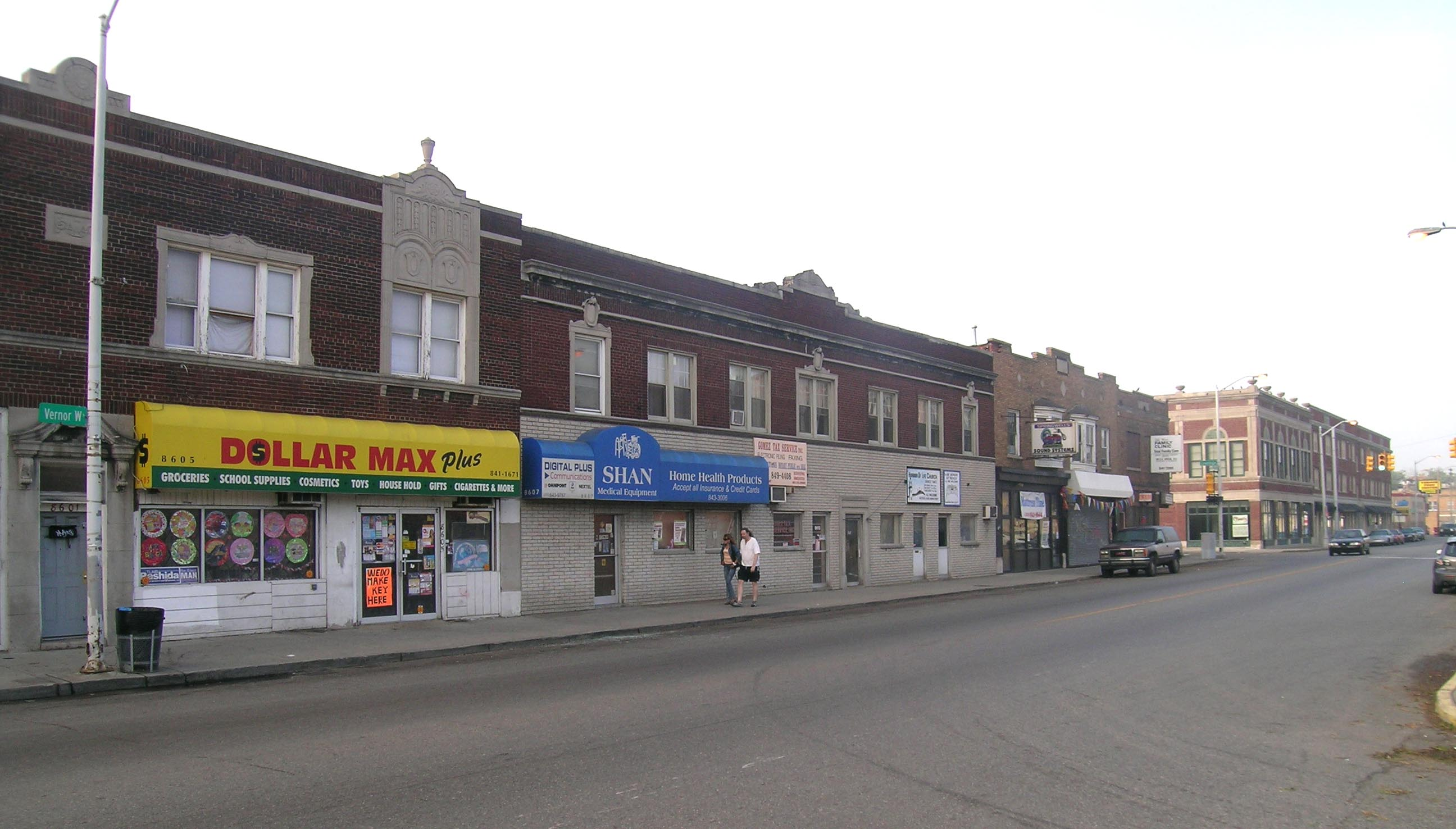
South side of Vernor at Ferris (Four buildings, 8547 - 8633 W Vernor)

== See also ==
- West Vernor-Junction Historic District
- West Vernor-Springwells Historic District
