= Academy of the Sacred Heart (Bloomfield Township, Michigan) =

Academy of the Sacred Heart, Bloomfield Township, Michigan

Location
- 1250 Kensington Road; Bloomfield Township, (Oakland County), Michigan 48304; United States; 42°34′48″N 83°13′32″W

Information
- Type: Private, Girls-only
- Religious affiliations: Roman Catholic; Sacred Heart
- Established: 1851; 175 years ago
- Head of school: Joseph E. Carver
- Grades: Infants–Grade 12
- Colors: Navy Blue and Gold
- Athletics conference: Catholic High School League
- Team name: Gazelles for Girls' teams, Knights for Boys' teams
- Accreditation: North Central Association of Colleges and Schools, Independent School Association of the Central States, Sacred Heart Commission on Goals
- Affiliation: Network of Sacred Heart Schools
- Athletic Director: Paige Comito
- Website: http://www.ashmi.org

Academy of the Sacred Heart is a Roman Catholic, private, independent school located in Bloomfield Township, Michigan in Metro Detroit, near Bloomfield Hills.

It is the oldest independent school in Michigan. Founded in 1851 in Detroit, the Academy moved to its 28-acre (110,000 m^{2}) campus in Bloomfield Township in 1958. It is a Catholic, college-preparatory school for young women from infancy through Grade 12 and for boys from infancy through Grade 8 of many cultures and faiths. The Academy is a member of the Network of Sacred Heart Schools, which includes 24 schools in the U.S.-Canada and an affiliation with the Society of the Sacred Heart in 41 countries around the world.

== Background ==
Academy of the Sacred Heart was established by St. Madeleine Sophie Barat in 1851 in Detroit. The school moved to Bloomfield Township in 1958.

In 1821, Rev. Gabriel Richard visited Mother Rose Philippine Duchesne in Florissant, Missouri. Fr. Richard asked Mother Duchesne to establish a group in Detroit. This initial request was denied until 1848 when Monique Labadie Beaubien wrote to Mother Hardy, Superior Provincial in New York, donated a piece of the Antoine Beaubien land on Jefferson Avenue for an academy school, on the condition that orphans would also be educated. On the southwest corner of Jefferson and St. Antoine Street, a building was erected in 1861 at a cost exceeding $30,000. The building was built to accommodate 150 students and for 50 years this was the school.

In 1918, the original cornerstone was placed in its new location as a school was built on Lawrence Avenue. By the 1950s, the population shifted northward and the relocation of the school was considered. Mother Katherine Wansboro bought 20 acres (81,000 m^{2}) in Bloomfield Township. The groundbreaking was held in July 1957. The original cornerstone was also set in place and inscribed with “Built on Confidence in the Heart of Jesus.” The actual move into the new building took place on July 15, 1958.

=== Kensington Academy ===
Kensington Academy was a boy's elementary and middle school of the Roman Catholic Archdiocese of Detroit. The school opened on the campus of the Academy of the Sacred Heart in Bloomfield Township in 1969. It moved into its own campus in 1982.

It initially occupied a campus in Bloomfield Township, but toward the end of its life its facility was in Beverly Hills.

In 2006 the school announced that it was merging with the Academy of the Sacred Heart. The current Academy of the Sacred Heart's middle school for boys, "Kensington Hall," is named after the former Kensington Academy. "Kensington Hall" was founded in 2002.

International Academy's Okma Campus occupies the former Kensington Academy campus in Bloomfield Township. The Japanese School of Detroit, a supplementary Japanese school serving Japanese nationals and Japanese Americans, previously had its school office at Kensington Academy.

== Notable people ==
- Bonnie Brennan, CEO of Christie's, graduated circa 1991.
- Marilyn Fisher Lundy, businesswoman and philanthropist, graduated in 1942.
