= Grosse Pointe Academy =

- Academy of the Sacred Heart
- U.S. National Register of Historic Places
- U.S. Historic district
- Michigan State Historic Site
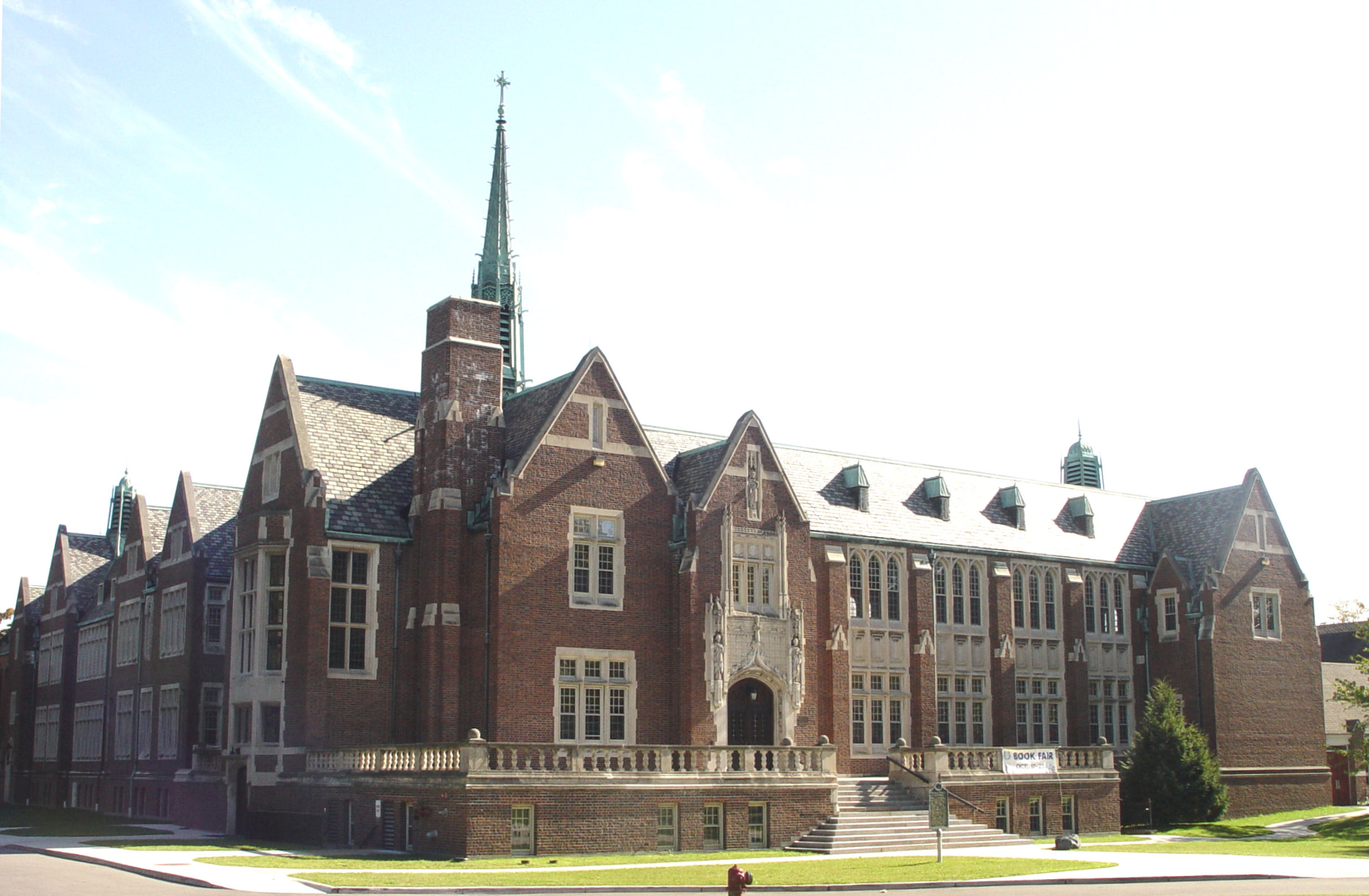

- Location within Michigan Location within the United States
- Interactive map
- Location: 171 Lake Shore Drive; Grosse Pointe Farms, Michigan
- Coordinates: 42°23′35″N 82°53′37″W
- Area: 18.9 acres (7.6 ha)
- Built: 1885
- Architect: William Schickel, Maginnis & Walsh
- Architectural style: Late Gothic Revival, Tudor Revival, Italianate
- NRHP reference No.: 87001061

Significant dates
- Added to NRHP: June 25, 1987
- Designated MSHS: April 15, 1977

The Grosse Pointe Academy is an independent day school located at 171 Lake Shore Drive in Grosse Pointe Farms, Michigan. Originally known as the Academy of the Sacred Heart, the campus buildings were designated a Michigan State Historic Site in 1977 and listed on the National Register of Historic Places in 1987. The school serves preschool through middle school (lower secondary school).

== History ==
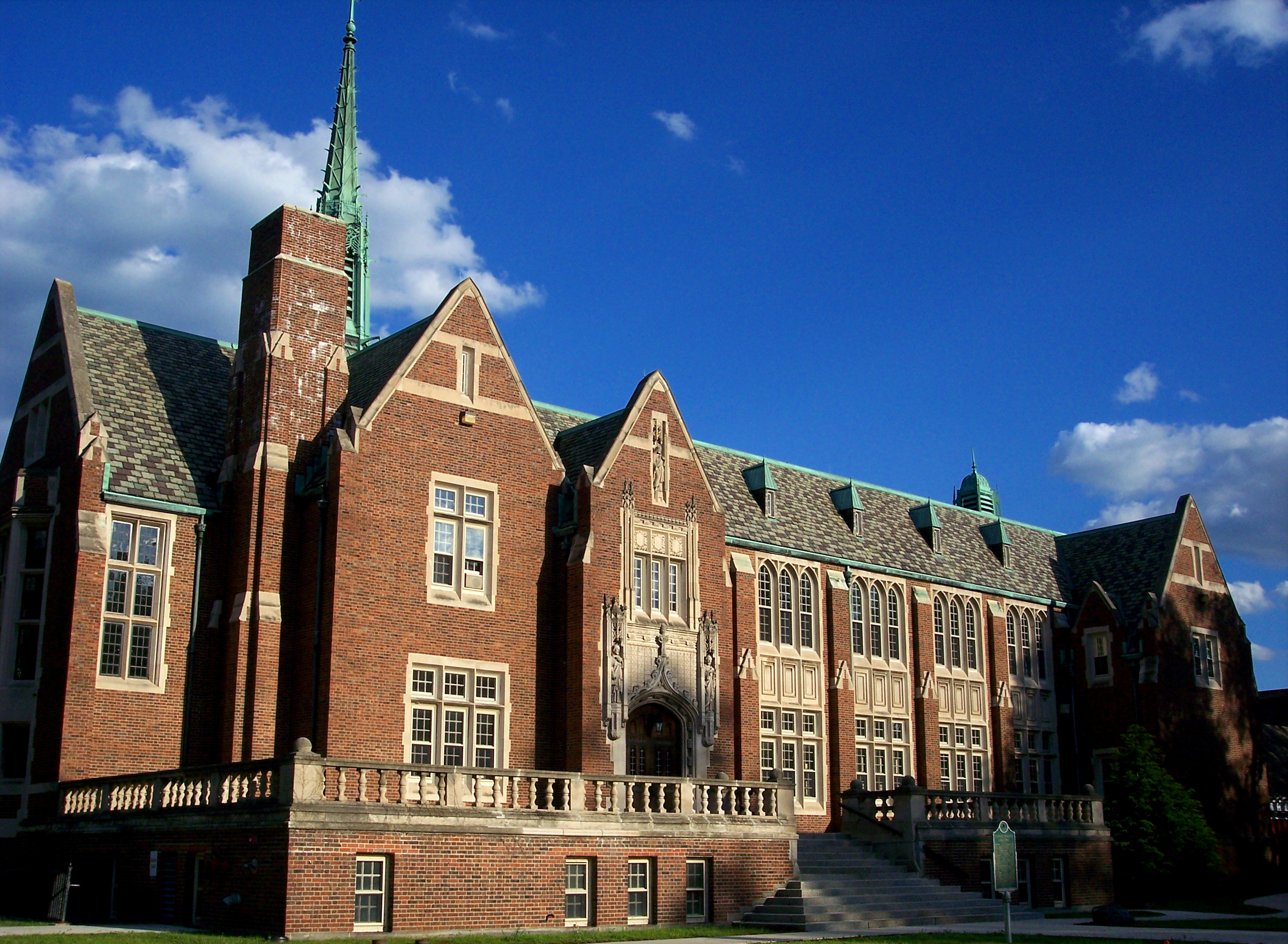
The Grosse Pointe Academy

The site on which the Grosse Pointe Academy now sits was originally a French ribbon farm running from Lake St. Clair to Ridge Road. In 1867, the Society of the Sacred Heart, an order of cloistered nuns, obtained the property, and the next year a small public school was built on the property. In 1885, the nuns planned the construction of a boarding school for young ladies, teaching grades K–12, on the property. The school was built in 1887 along the property line separating the academy from Saint Paul's, so that the nuns could enter the building from within the property and the students could enter from the parking lot of St. Paul's. The remainder of the property continued to be a self-sustaining farm. In 1899, the chapel was added.

In the late 1920s, recognizing the need for more space, the sisters sold off the portion of the farm beyond Grosse Pointe Boulevard and used the proceeds to build a new education building and renovate the chapel. Farming continued on the property until the 1940s. In 1969, the Sisters deeded the property to a lay Board of Trustees, who continued the educational mission of the school as the Grosse Pointe Academy, a co-educational day school.

== Description ==
The Grosse Pointe Academy is situated on a long strip of land between Grosse Pointe Boulevard and Lake Shore Drive on Lake Saint Clair, and directly adjacent to Saint Paul Catholic Church (Grosse Pointe Farms, Michigan). Seven buildings are situated on the site, of which five are contributing structures to the historic district: an 1855 farmhouse, four large educational buildings dating from 1885 to 1930. The last two structures, a 1939 headmaster's house and a maintenance shed, are non-contributing.
