= Holy Redeemer High School (Detroit) =

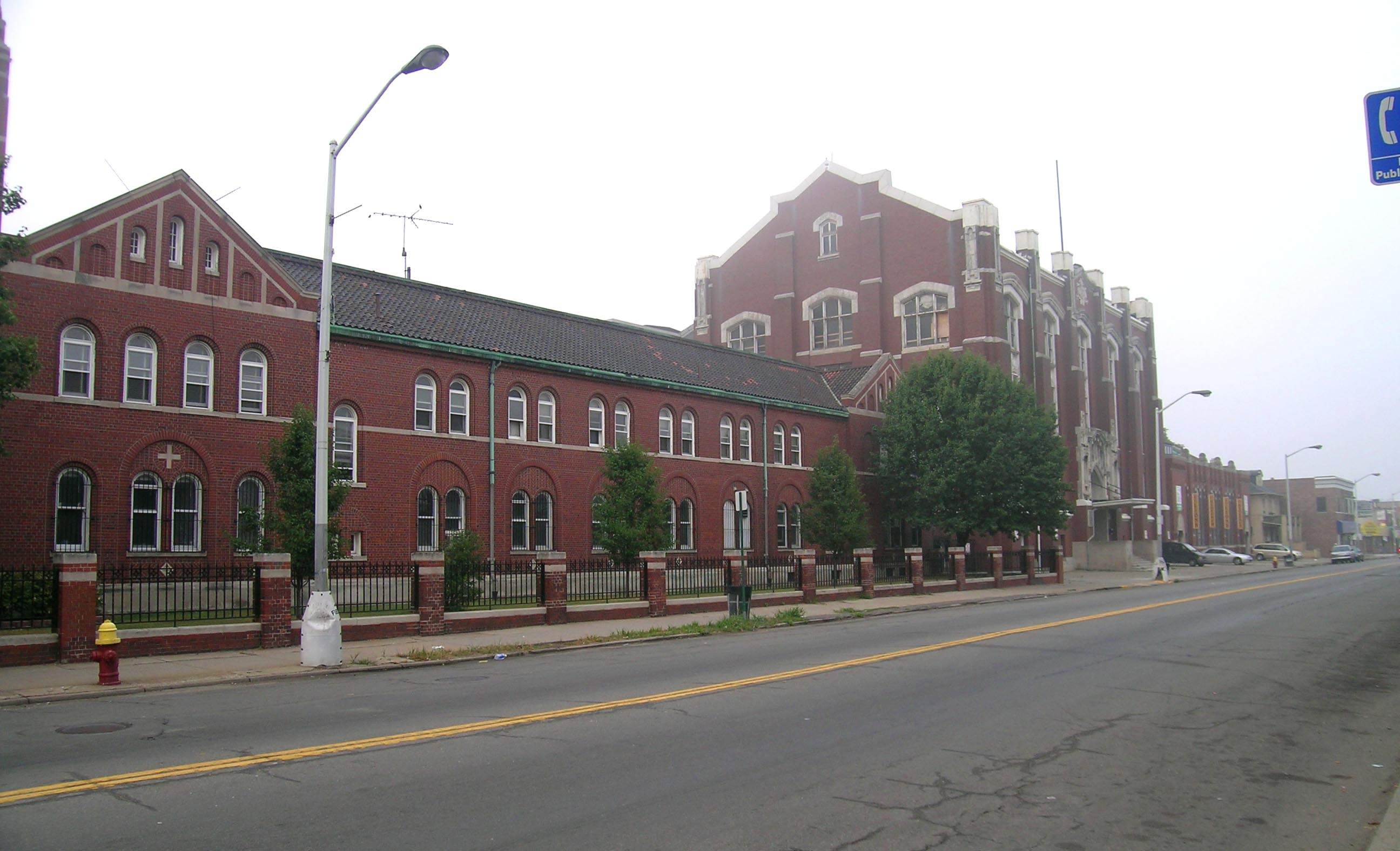
- South side of Vernor at Junction, looking southwest

Location
- 5668 Baker St. Detroit, Michigan; 42.316°N 83.102°W

Information
- Type: Private, Coeducational
- Religious affiliation: Roman Catholic Church
- Established: 1882
- Closed: 2005
- Grades: 9-12
- Colors: Purple and Gold
- Athletics conference: Detroit Catholic High School League
- Nickname: Lions

Holy Redeemer High School was a Roman Catholic secondary school located in Southwest Detroit, at the corner of Junction and Vernor streets, near the Ambassador Bridge to Canada. It was overseen by the Archdiocese of Detroit.

It was founded in 1882 and closed in 2005 after 123 years. A new Catholic School Detroit Cristo Rey High School opened in the Holy Redeemer High School building in 2008. Cristo Rey, at its founding in Detroit, occupied one portion of the Holy Redeemer High School building while a public charter school occupied the other portion of the building. The adjoining Holy Redeemer Catholic Parish and Holy Redeemer grade school both remain in operation.

Other schools closed along with Holy Redeemer High School at the same time in 2005 included: Detroit East Catholic, Detroit Deporres, Detroit Benedictine, Redford Bishop Borgess, Harper Woods Bishop Gallagher (Trinity High School), Harper Woods Notre Dame, Refdord St. Agatha and Centerline St. Clement. The closing of Holy Redeemer High School was met with anger and disappointment from students, faculty, alumni and many other members of the community - none of whom had input into the decision to close or an ability to advocate to continue the school's operation.

In 2002, the entire Parish grounds including the high school were recognized as part of the West Vernor-Junction Historic District listed in the National Register of Historic Places for its architecture and historic importance.

== History ==
Holy Redeemer High School was founded in 1882 by the Sisters, Servants of the Immaculate Heart of Mary (IHM) with the assistance of the Redemptorist Fathers (CSsR). The school was a founding member of the Archdiocese of Detroit Catholic League for Athletics. At its peak enrollment in 1972, Holy Redeemer's student population number was almost 1,000.

The enrollment was about 200 when the school closed. Prior to the closing, the Redemptorist Fathers who founded the parish and school left the parish in about 2000.

The IHM religious sisters closed their 4-story convent a few years later, due to declining numbers of religious members. The convent which lacked individual room plumbing and bathrooms as well as rooms capable of only accommodating 1 person was torn down approximately 2005 due to prohibitive cost of renovation and on-going maintenance concerns.

The Basilian Fathers administered Holy Redeemer High School for approximately five years until the time of its closing. At one-time Holy Redeemer High School was separated as a boys high school and a girls high school. The boys high school was administered by the Marist fathers and the girls high school was administered by the I.H.M sisters. The Marist fathers left Holy Redeemer at some point in the late 1940s/early 1950s and the I.H.M sisters took over administration of the combined girls and boys high school at that time.

== School closing ==
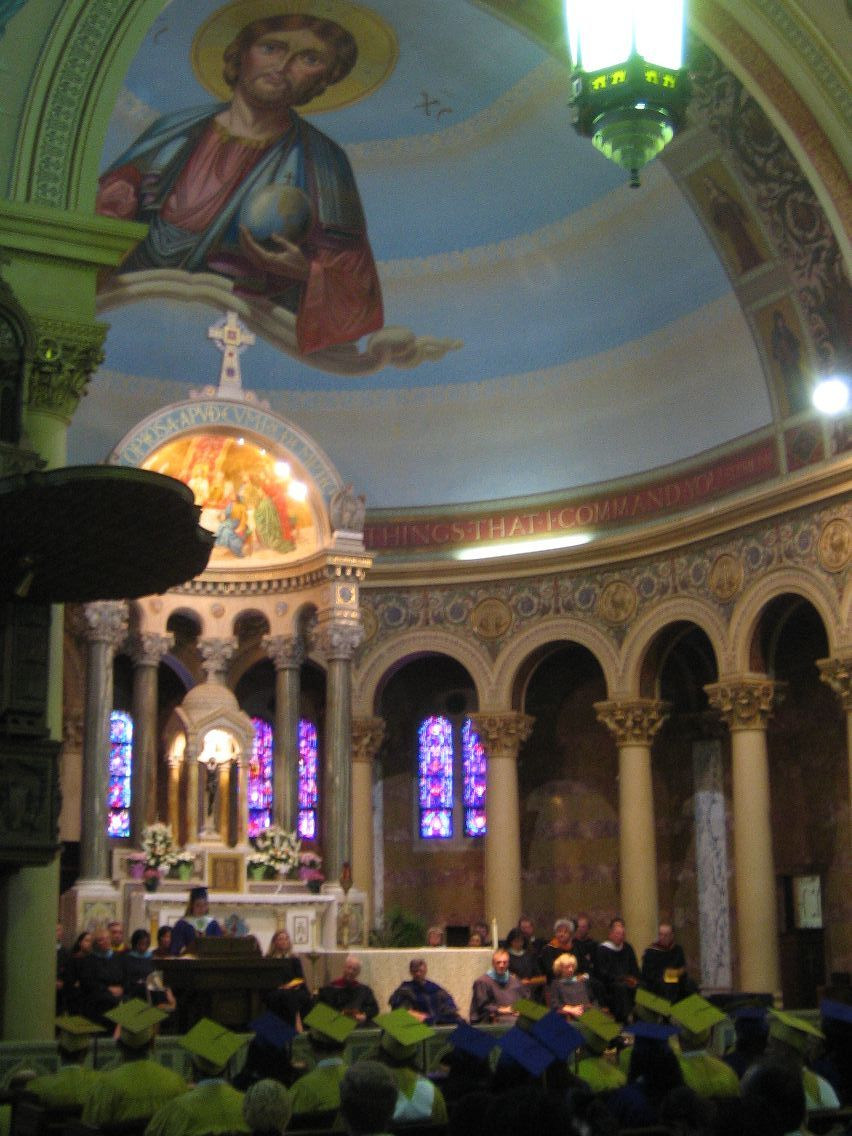
Photo of the last graduation ceremony for the high school to be held in the Most Holy Redeemer Church Sanctuary

In 1971, the Archdiocese of Detroit closed St. Gabriel's, All Saints, Our Lady of Lourdes and St. Vincent's high schools to make Holy Redeemer the regional Catholic high school for Southwest Detroit, Ecorse and River Rouge.

Later, St. Andrew's (in 1983), St. Hedwig's (in 1990) and St. Alphonsus' (in 2003) closed, leaving Holy Redeemer the only Catholic high school on the southwest side of Detroit. The Archdiocese of Detroit, which once maintained over 100 high schools throughout the Metro Detroit Region, had just 24 remaining high schools. The continued closing of Catholic high schools in Detroit reflects the closure that has occurred as well dozens of City of Detroit public schools and the decrease in City of Detroit population from a one-time high of 2.5 million to a July 2018 census estimate of 672,662 residents.

At the time of the school's closing in 2005, the population was approximately 70% Latino, 20% African-American and 10% Caucasian. The student population was approximately 80% Catholic, and the number of students going on to college was approximately 90% of the graduating class. The majority of students displaced from Holy Redeemer enrolled at St. Frances Cabrini High School in Allen Park, with other students enrolling in Western High School, Southwestern High School and Cesar Chavez High School.

Detroit Cristo Rey High School purchased the former Holy Redeemer High School main school building, gymnasium and four-story auditorium building from the Archdiocese of Detroit for $2.3 million in October, 2013. Detroit Cristo Rey is under the sponsorship of the Basilian Fathers and the Sisters, Servants of the Immaculate Heart of Mary.

== Athletics ==
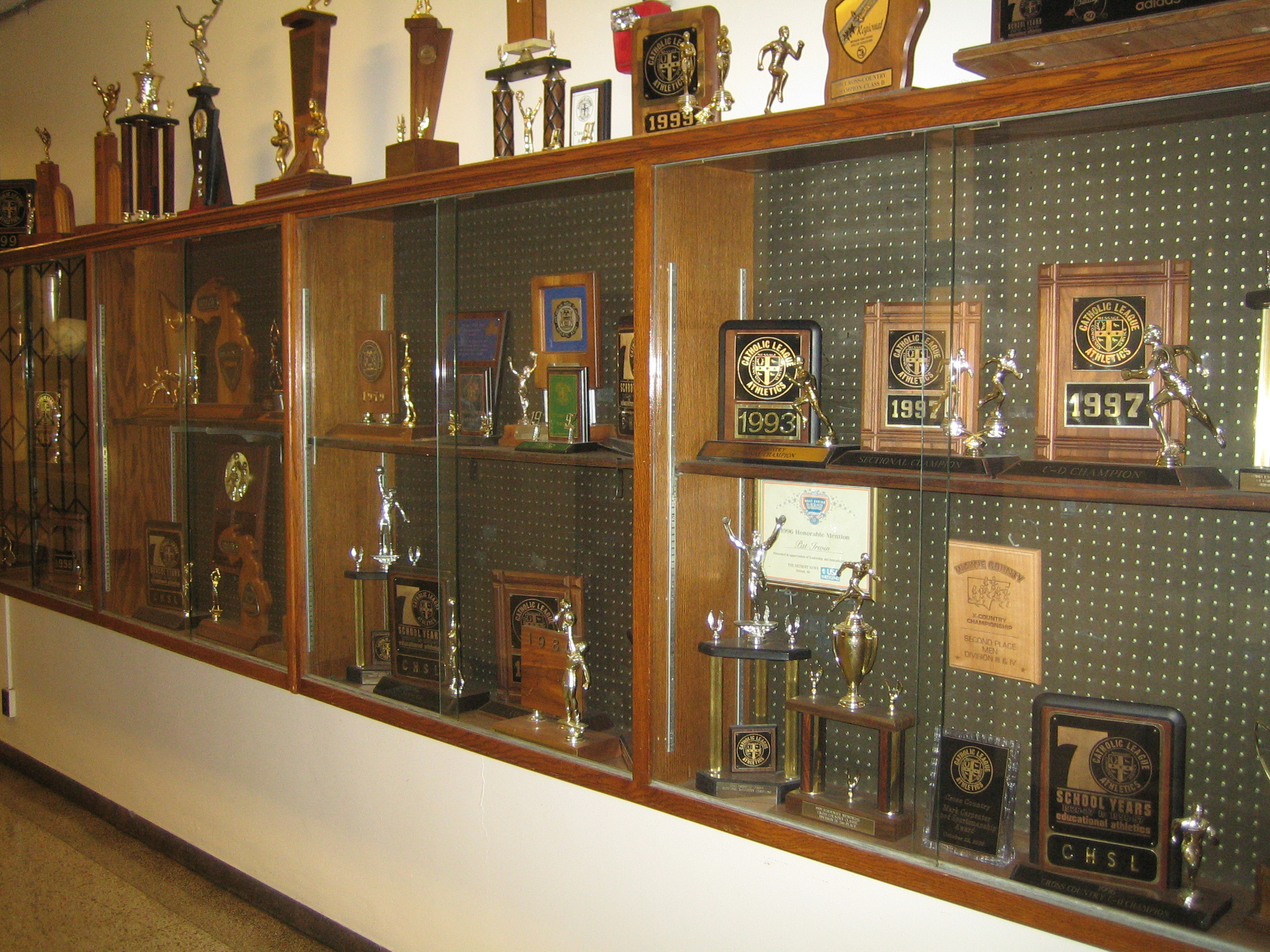
Main Trophy Case

Although a small school, Holy Redeemer excelled at several sports over the years including two state basketball championships (1960 and 1995), a state championship runner in cross-country in 1928, several state finalists for wrestling and numerous district, regional and league championships in all sports.

During the 1960s, the school became known as a basketball powerhouse with recognition by Parade magazine, The Detroit News, and the Detroit Free Press of several notable players such as Bill Chmielewski ('60), Dwight Jones ('65), Marty Sheedy ('68), and Tom Targosz ('69).

A coach who rose to national prominence was Bill McCartney, who served as an assistant football coach under his older brother Tom during the 1965 season, and as head basketball coach 1965-1969, taking the team to the Detroit City Championship during the 1968-1969 season. Bill McCartney went on to win the 1990 NCAA National Football Championship as head coach at Colorado University.

Dan Boisture ('43) was an All-State football and basketball player at Holy Redeemer. He went on to become the head football coach at Eastern Michigan University, and then the head coach of the Detroit Wheels of the World Football League.

In addition to their athletic teams, the high school used to hold professional basketball games for a season for the Detroit Gems, who eventually became the Los Angeles Lakers. They also later briefly hosted the Detroit Vagabond Kings for some home games until they left the National Basketball League in its final season of play.

== In popular culture ==
The parish was the centerpiece of the 1987 movie The Rosary Murders, starring Charles Durning and Donald Sutherland, filmed on location at Holy Redeemer and the surrounding neighborhood.

== See also ==
- Archdiocese of Detroit
