= Kostiuk =

Kostiuk or Kostyuk (Ukrainian: Костюк) is a patronymic surname of Ukrainian origin derived from the personal name "Kosty, Kost", and the Ukrainian diminutive suffix "-uk/yuk". Thus, the surname Kostiuk can be interpreted as "son or descendant of Kosty or Kost". The name Kosty or Kost is a pet form of the male given name Kostiantyn.

Kostyuk may also be a diminutive given name derived from "Kostiantyn", and it may produce patronymic surnames as well: Kostiukovich, Kostiuchenko.

Notable people with the surname include:

- Denys Kostyuk (born 1982), Ukrainian bicycle racer
- Dmytro Kostiuk (born 1993), Ukrainian journalist and politician
- Dmytro Kostyuk (born 1965), Ukrainian music and television producer
- Eric Kostiuk Williams (born 1990), Canadian cartoonist
- Ihor Kostyuk (born 1975), Ukrainian footballer
- Iurii Kostiuk (born 1977), Ukrainian Paralympic biathlete and skier
- Marta Kostyuk (born 2002), Ukrainian tennis player
- Mike Kostiuk (1919–2015), American gridiron football player
- Platon Kostiuk (1924–2010), Ukrainian physiologist
- Sergey Kostyuk (born 1978), Ukrainian and Kazakhstani footballer
- Serhiy Kostyuk (born 1986), Ukrainian footballer
- Tatiana Kostiuk (born 1982), Ukrainian chess player
- Valeriy Kostyuk (born 1940), Russian physicist
- Vasyl Kostyuk (born 1989), Ukrainian footballer
- Volodymyr Kostiuk (2003), Ukrainian gymnast
- Vladimir Kostyuk (born 1972), Turkmenistani footballer
- Yevhen Kostyuk (born 2002), Ukrainian footballer
