= Hanley International Academy =

School in Michigan, United States

Coordinates: 42.38603°N 83.05347°W

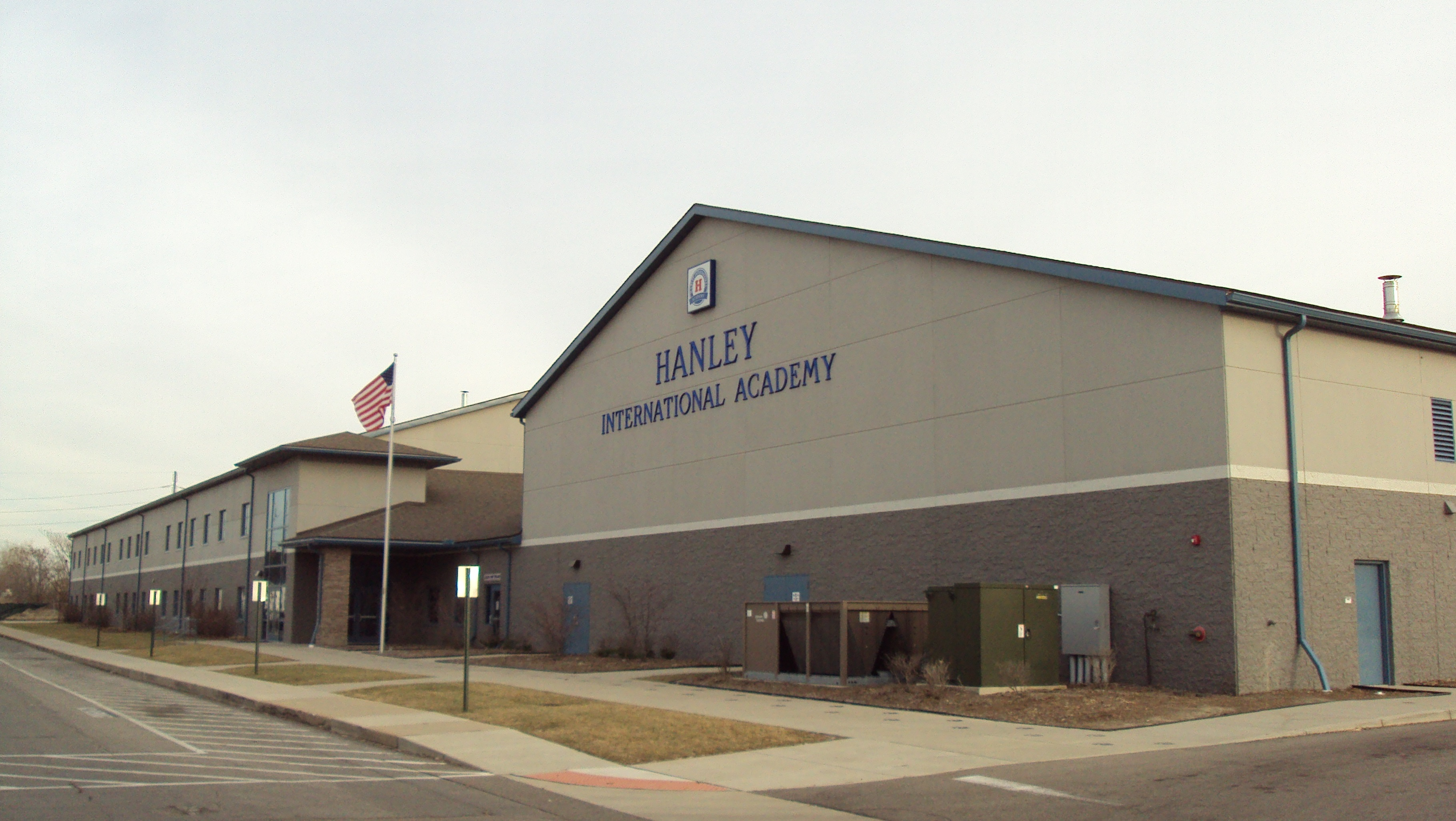
Hanley International Academy

Hanley International Academy is a preK-8 charter school in Hamtramck, Michigan in Greater Detroit. Prior to opening its new building, the school occupied two separate buildings. The school operates under a contract with Grand Valley State University in Allendale, Michigan. Students are required to wear school uniforms.

== History ==
The school began in August 2005. From 2005 to 2006 the student population increased from around 200 to 400. In 2006 Nikki Doby, the business manager of the charter school, said that the influx of the students resulted from the addition of one grade level and the opening of a new building. Doby also said that 90 to 95 percent of Hanley's students lived within the boundaries of the Hamtramck Public Schools school district, and that the new students did not originate from the Detroit Public Schools school district. One of the buildings used by Hanley was originally St. Florian Elementary School, a Roman Catholic Archdiocese of Detroit school which closed in 2006.

As of 2006 many of the students at the charter school were recent immigrants, and of them, many did not speak English. The fandom of the Detroit Tigers became a unifying force for the immigrant students.

Prior to the opening of its current campus, the school occupied two buildings. Grades Pre-K through 2 attended the Hanley Street campus, and grades 3-8 attended the Poland Street campus. In 2011 the school's current campus opened. It was the first new school building in Hamtramck in over 75 years; the last new school building opened in 1935. Since the opening of the current campus, all grade levels attend the same campus.

== Campus ==
The current campus, on Denton Street, has 65,000 square feet (6,000 m^{2}) of space. The 45 classroom building has a capacity of 750 pupils.

Previously grades K-2 were in the Hanley Street Building and 3-6 were in the Poland Street Building.
