= St. Florian Church (Hamtramck, Michigan) =

Historic church in Michigan, United States

- St. Florian Historic District
- U.S. National Register of Historic Places
- U.S. Historic district
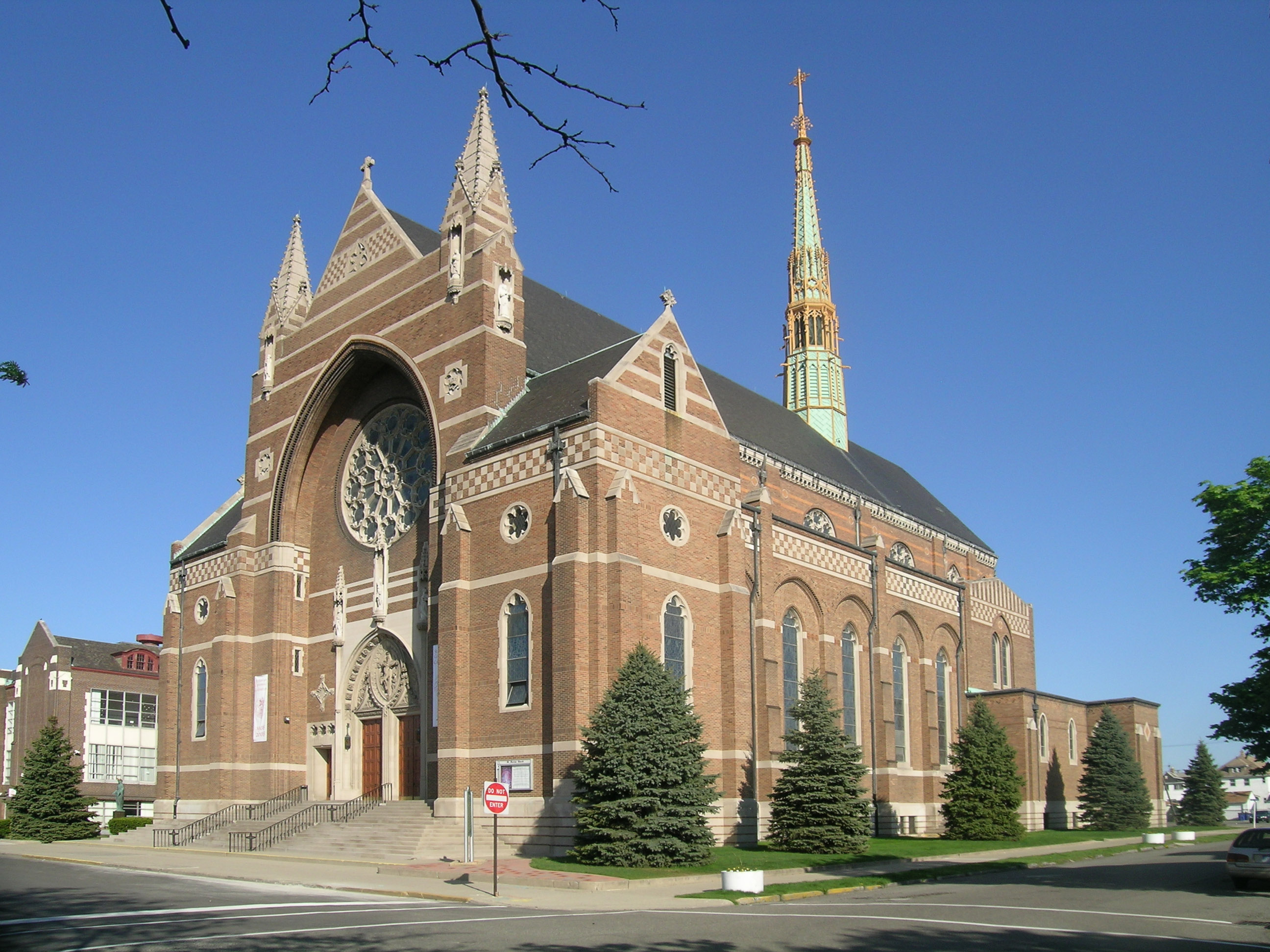
- Facade of St. Florian

- Location within Michigan Location within the United States
- Interactive map
- Location: Roughly bounded by Joseph Campau Ave., Holbrook Ave., Dequindre, Norwalk, Lumpkin, and Yemans Sts., Hamtramck, Michigan
- Coordinates: 42°23′41″N 83°3′42″W
- Area: 83 acres (34 ha)
- Built: 1908, 1926
- Architect: Ralph Adams Cram
- Architectural style: Late Gothic Revival, Bungalow/Craftsman, Polish Cathedral style
- NRHP reference No.: 84001865
- Added to NRHP: September 13, 1984

St. Florian Church is a Roman Catholic Church at 2626 Poland Street in Hamtramck, Michigan. The church was designed by Ralph Adams Cram of the firm Cram and Ferguson.

== Parish ==
St. Florian's parish consists of predominantly Polish members whose families were immigrants from Poland and settled in Hamtramck after Dodge opened an automobile factory in 1910. Clergy are of the Society of Christ.

By 1907, Ford, Dodge, and Packard plants were employing many Polish immigrants who settled in Hamtramck Township or in contiguous neighborhoods on what was then the northern edge of the city of Detroit. The Roman Catholic Archdiocese of Detroit recognized the need for a church to serve Polish residents, and established the parish named for St. Florian, patron of Poland, in 1907. Services were initially held in a storefront.

The influx of Polish immigrants created a need for churches. The first Polish Catholic Church in Detroit was St. Albertus (1872), followed by St. Florian (1907) in Hamtramck and six others in surrounding Detroit: Sweetest Heart of Mary (1888); St. Casimir (1882); St. Francis of Assisi (1889); St. Josaphat (1889); St. Stanislaus (1890s); St. John Cantius (1902); St. Hedwig's (1903); and St. Hyacinth (1905).

Ground was broken for a church building in March 1908. The cornerstone was laid on July 12, 1908, and the dedication was held on January 10, 1909. As the congregation grew the original building quickly became inadequate. Parishioners amassed $500,000 (in pre-Depression funds) to build a larger sanctuary.

== The present church ==
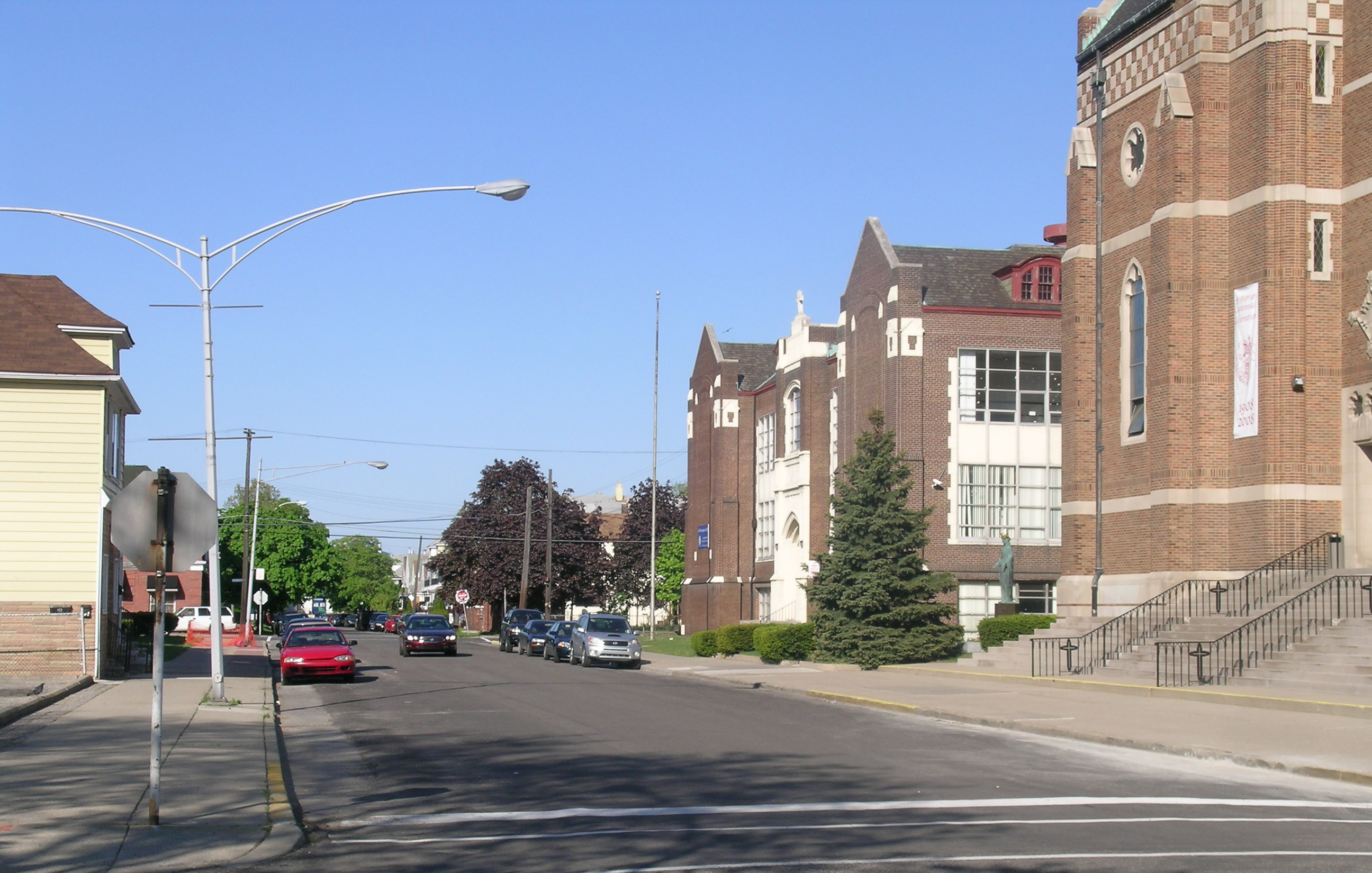
Streetscape in front of St. Florian.

Cram, who is best known for popularizing Gothic architecture in the United States, was chosen to design the building. He created a magnificent modified English Gothic structure that won an award from American Architect magazine in 1929.

Cram used modern construction techniques that included building on a steel frame and using bricks on the exterior.

Construction on the present edifice began in January 1926 and the church was dedicated on October 21, 1928. Nearly 5,000 people turned out for the dedication of the building. The cornerstone is in both Latin and Polish.

In both its opulence and scale, it is a monumentally grand Polish Cathedral style building. The church's spire rises nearly 200 ft (61 m) above the street and was designed to stand in stark contrast to the smokestacks of Hamtramck's industrial environment. St. Florian is the tallest building in Hamtramck, and its silhouette is used in the city's logo. The church is taller than the Cathedral of the Most Blessed Sacrament which houses the seat of the Detroit archdiocese. It seats 1,200 and the altar was made in Italy.

The award-winning opulence of St. Florian's is a reminder of the "humble structure" that preceded it; the prosperity and generosity of parishioners made possible construction of "one of the most attractive churches in the metropolis." The front facade has a "broad Gothic Arch flanked by twin spires notable for the impression they give of lightness and delicateness." Exceptional brickwork is arrayed in a varied horizontal bands.

The interior consists of the nave of six bays topped by a rib vault. The vault is blue with vines painted at the groins. The main aisle is flanked by two smaller aisles. At the Clerestory level of each bay is a small rose window and on the sides are large stained glass windows. "The stained glass work is striking and fitting". and was manufactured by Kase Company in its New York studio. The structure is dominated by an ornate rose window above the organ loft. In each window flanking the nave, the design uses images depicting a familiar narrative story. One window includes the figure of Nicolaus Copernicus, the astronomer who challenged the Catholic Church's traditional view that the earth is the center of the universe. The altar windows depict five Polish saints — Casimir, Florian, Hedwig, Hyacinth and Stanislaus. The nave windows illustrate the joyful and glorious mysteries of the rosary, and other vignettes from the life and teachings of Jesus Christ.

The 1928 Austin electric Pipe organ Opus No. 1526 (3 manuals and 26 ranks) was renovated and rededicated April 13, 2008.

Pastor Fr. Thomasz Sielicki noted that St. Florian had as many as seven priests and 3,000 students in the school during its heyday and that it kept many parishioners for their whole lives. "Many received all their sacraments from here," he said. "People are really very strongly connected to their church." The church currently has about 600 parishioners.

In December 2011, a committee of the Archdiocese of Detroit released its recommendations concerning maintenance and closing of various parishes. It made three contingent recommendations about St. Florian's:
1. By June, 2012, submission to the LDP Committee and Finance Council of a repayment plan for the $1,850,000.00 owed to the Archdiocese;
2. Commitment by the Society of Christ religious order to continuing to pastor St. Florian, then it would "become a cluster partner of Our Lady of Czestochowa in Sterling Heights. The parishes share the same order of priests, and same mission.";
3. Alternatively, if the Society of Christ religious order leaves the parish then (a) it could become 'mission church for the Polish immigrants in the city of Hamtramck'; (b) the parish would be sold to pay off the debt; or (c) if the parish is debt free, its fate would be subject to further discussion.

== Noteworthy events ==
In 1969, the cardinal archbishop of Kraków, Karol Wojtyła, who later became Pope John Paul II, celebrated Mass at St. Florian.

The church also served as a backdrop for some scenes in the Theresa Connelly film Polish Wedding.

Detroit City councilman (and former Mayor) Kenneth Cockrel is a graduate of St. Florian High School, which is now closed.

Consistent with being named for St. Florian – the patron saint of firefighters who is credited with saving Kraków from fire – for more than a decade the church has hosted an annual firefighters' mass on the first Saturday in May. This event is held in conjunction with the St. Florian Strawberry festival.

In 2008, a Mass was celebrated on the Feast of Christ the King to a standing-room-only crowd, Cardinal Adam Maida was the lead celebrant. His English homily was followed by one in Polish by Fr. Tomasz Sielicki, S.Chr., Fr. Mirosław Frankowski's predecessor and now the order's general superior.

Cardinal Maida called the day a "historic and joyful occasion". He also called attention to the Felician Sisters, who opened the parish's elementary school 99 years ago and its high school in 1940. Additionally, he recognized the parishioners and lay organizations and "self-sacrificing lay faithful who have given of their time, their talent, and their treasure to maintain this great parish over the decades." The Cardinal also spoke about the visit of Pope John Paul II to Hamtramck in 1987.

At a Mass on November 23. 2009, the church celebrated its centenary.

In conjunction with the celebration, a Michigan Historical marker was erected. Fr. Sielicki said it's important to recognize the parish's history especially since it will start celebrating its 100-year anniversary this Christmas. "We see in it recognition of our spiritual, cultural and social contribution of this parish to the life of Metro Detroit," he said. "It is for ourselves a reminder to do the same in the future." He added, "I think it will make our church even better known in the area."

The historical marker, Registered Site L2189, was erected in 2007 at Florian Street between Brombach and Latham Streets, in Hamtramck, Wayne County, Michigan. The text indicates:

Saint Florian Church

Saint Florian Parish was founded in 1907 to serve the Detroit area's rapidly expanding Polish Catholic community. By the 1920s Saint Florian was the second largest Catholic parish in Detroit, and it required a larger church. The Reverend John Bonkowski hired Boston architect Ralph Adams Cram to design this building, inspired by the Gothic churches of the Middle Ages. The church's medieval style contrasted with the modern industrial community. Nowakowski and Sons of Hamtramck built the church, and the J.M. Kase & Company made the stained glass in its New York Studio. The working-class parishioners sacrificed to build the church. In 1929 American Architect magazine named it the best new church in America.

The obverse of the marker states:

Saint Florian Historic District

The Saint Florian Historic District is roughly bounded by Holbrook, Joseph Campau Ave., Yemans, and Dequindre Streets. Incorporated as a village in 1901, Hamtramck experienced rapid growth when Eastern European immigrants came to work at nearby Dodge, Ford and Packard automotive plants. The village's population boomed from 3,559 in 1910 to 48,615 in 1920. In the shadow of the magnificent Saint Florian Church, modest houses occupy thirty-foot-wide lots. Platted in 1909 as Whitney's subdivision, the densely developed neighborhood was built in anticipation of an influx of workers to the Dodge Main factory that opened less than one mile from here in 1910. The district reflects the tightly knit Polish community that first lived here.

== See also ==
- History of the Polish Americans in Metro Detroit
- Archdiocese of Detroit
- Polish Cathedral style
- St. Florian's Cathedral Warsaw, Poland
