= Kostiuchenko =

Kostiuchenko or Kostyuchenko is a Ukrainian patronymic surname derived from the diminutive form Kostyuk of the given name Kostiantyn ("Kostyuk" may be a surname as well). Notable people with the surname include:

- Elena Kostyuchenko (born 1987), Russian journalist and gay-rights activist
- Sergey Kostiuchenko (born 1965), Belarusian military conductor
