= Jean Hoxie =

American tennis player and coach (1898–1970)

Jean Raymond Hoxie
- Residence: Hamtramck, Michigan, US
- Born: March 17, 1898 Grout Township, Michigan, US
- Died: May 6, 1970 (aged 72) Midland, Michigan, US
- College: Columbia

Jean Hoxie was a Hamtramck, Michigan tennis player and coach. In 1965, she was inducted into the Michigan Sports Hall of Fame.

== Biography ==
At the Class A level in Michigan under the banner of the Hamtramck High School Cosmos, Jean Hoxie and her husband Jerry Hoxie developed 16 state titleholders in singles tennis, and 13 state titleholders in doubles tennis. At all levels, members of their program won 18 boys state championships between 1949 and 1969 in high school competition.

Male players coached by the Hoxie program included Ken Angyal, Chuck Brainard, Pancho Castillo, Gerry Dubie, Al Hetseck, Ted Jax, George Korol, Fred Kovaleski, John Lamerato, Tony Lamerato, Jerry Parchute, Bill Petrick, Dick Potter, and Ray Senkowski. Winning national honors, Hoxie-coached female players included Peaches Bartkowicz, Elaine Lewicki, Joyce Pniewski, Stephanie Prychitko, Phyllis Saganski, and June Stack.

In the 1940s, Jean Hoxie and her husband Jerry established the first tennis camp in the United States.

Jean Hoxie, the first woman to coach a Michigan high school boys tennis team, was judged by consensus to be "the most successful tennis coach of teenage players in Michigan history". More than 200 national and international champions achieved their skills under her tutelage. From 1949 through 1964, her Hamtramck teams won 15 state titles in 16 years. She formed and ran successful tennis clinics in Asia, Africa, Europe, South America, Canada and the United States.

Jean Hoxie was of Polish descent.

The Hoxies' contribution has been summarized as: "If asked to name the dominating force in Michigan tennis history, any person even remotely aware of our sport would undoubtedly arrive at the names of Jean and Jerry Hoxie. Indeed, the list of state and national junior champions produced from that most unlikely location, Hamtramck, is a testament to the true greatness of what these two astonishing people achieved." Hamtramck tennis was of such import that it has been treated in works of fiction.

She coached more than 300 U.S. National tennis champions, and one world champion. Bartkowicz won the girls' Wimbledon singles title in 1964.

Famous tennis clinic pupils included Spanish Chief of State Francisco Franco and U.S. First Lady Jacqueline Kennedy. The Kennedy lessons were given at the White House.

For the three final years of her career, Jean Hoxie taught at the Northwood Institute in Midland, Michigan. On 6 May 1970, she died in an automobile accident from her own car on the Northwood campus.
