= Mike Kostiuk =

Canadian gridiron football player (1919–2015)

No. 28, 71
- Position: Offensive tackle

Personal information
- Born: August 1, 1919; Krydor, Saskatchewan, Canada
- Died: July 26, 2015 (aged 95); Sterling Heights, Michigan
- Listed height: 6 ft 0 in (1.83 m)
- Listed weight: 212 lb (96 kg)

Career information
- High school: Hamtramck (Hamtramck, MI)
- College: Detroit Tech
- NFL draft: 1941: undrafted

Career history
- Cleveland Rams (1941); Detroit Lions (1945); Buffalo Bisons (1946)

Awards and highlights
- First-team Little All-American (1939)

Career NFL statistics
- Games played: 7
- Games started: 3
- Stats at Pro Football Reference

Michael A. Kostiuk (August 1, 1919 – July 26, 2015) was a Canadian-born gridiron football player who was an offensive tackle in the National Football League (NFL).

== Personal life ==
Kostiuk was born in Krydor, Saskatchewan, Canada, to Ukrainian parents. He moved with his family to the United States when he was 5 and would grow up in Hamtramck, Michigan. He died of heart failure in 2015 in Sterling Heights, Michigan. He was the oldest living Detroit Lion when he died.

== Football ==
Kostiuk attended Hamtramck High School from 1934 to 1937, where he made All-City in 1935 and 1936, Detroit Tech from 1937 to 1940 on a football scholarship. In 1939, he earned a position on the Little All-American Team. The players on this elite team were chosen from Class B colleges throughout the country. He left Detroit Tech in 1941 to play for the Cleveland Rams. In 1942 he entered the United States Army and continued his football career there, making the Armed Forces All-Star team in 1943.

After leaving the Army in 1945, he signed with the Detroit Lions. In 1946 he joined the Buffalo Bisons. He played a total of seven National Football League games with the Detroit Lions and two All-America Football Conference games with the Buffalo Bisons and one with the Cleveland Rams. On November 6, 1986, he was inducted into the Hamtramck High School Sports Hall of Fame.
