= Paulette Childress =

American poet and writer (born 1948)

- Born: 1948 (age 77–78); Hamtramck, Michigan, U.S.
- Education: Wayne State University
- Occupation: Writer
- Writing career
- Years active: 1972–present
- Genres: Poetry; Short fiction

Paulette Childress (born 1948), also known as Paulette Childress White, is an American writer of poetry and short fiction.

== Early life ==
Paulette Childress was born in 1948 in Hamtramck, an enclave of Detroit, Michigan. She was the third of thirteen children born to Norris and Effie Childress.

After attending art school for one year, she dropped out due to financial problems and the birth of her first son. She would go on to have five children, all sons: Pierre, Oronde, Kojo, Kala, and Paul. After her difficult first marriage ended, she remarried.

== Career ==
Eventually, Childress began to pursue writing. She published her first poem in 1972, followed by her first short story, in Essence, in 1977. She eventually returned to school, graduating with a bachelor's degree from Wayne State University in 1986, followed by a PhD from the same institution in 1998.

In 1975, she published her first poetry collection, Love Poem to a Black Junkie. She was included in the 1977 Blacksongs broadside series, and then her book The Watermelon Dress: Portrait of a Woman, a four-part narrative poem, was published in 1984.

Throughout the 1970s and '80s, Childress produced short stories and poems for various publications, including Essence, Michigan Quarterly Review, Calalloo, and Redbook. Her writing has appeared in the anthologies Sturdy Black Bridges: Visions of Black Women in Literature (1979), Midnight Birds: Stories of Contemporary Black Women Writers (1980), and Mending the World: Stories of Family by Contemporary Black Writers (2003).

Themes of her work, which tends toward the autobiographical, include solidarity among women, marriage and motherhood, identity, and connections to Africa. She draws significantly on her hometown of Detroit as a setting.

Childress taught from 1987 to 1997 at Wayne State University, then at Henry Ford College, where she developed the school's first course in African American literature.

She has been honored with awards and grants from the Michigan Legislature, the Michigan Council for the Arts, and the Focus on Women Program at Henry Ford College.
