= Hamtramck Public Schools =

School district in Michigan, United States

Coordinates: 42°23′35.4″N 83°02′58.8″W

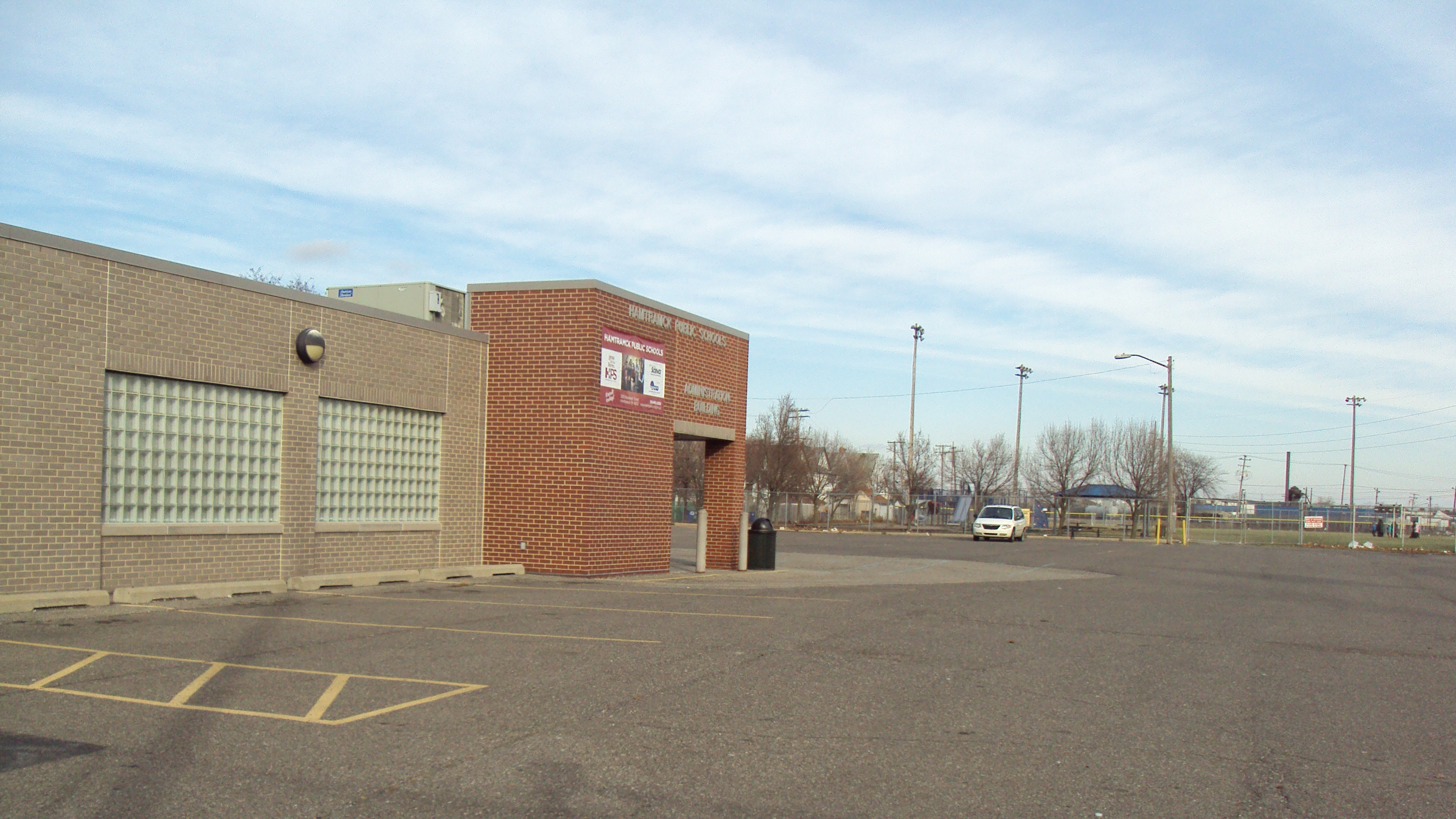
HPS Administration

Hamtramck Public Schools (HPS) is a public school district based in the city of Hamtramck, Michigan (USA) in Greater Detroit.

The district has the Schools of Choice program, which allows non-district students to enroll in district schools.

As of 2011 the official graduation rate is 62%. In 2011 the United Way for Southeastern Michigan arranged a program, funded by a $27.1 million General Motors Foundation grant, intended to improve the graduation rate.

== History ==
The oldest HPS school campus, Holbrook Elementary School

After Hamtramck became a municipality in 1922, every member of the Hamtramck Board of Education was a Pole and most students of the school system were Polish Catholics. In 1925, of the school district's 7,526 students, about 5,400 were ethnic Polish. Half of the ethnic Polish students were non-US citizens. By the mid-1920s, of the school-attending children in Hamtramck 66% attended public schools. The public schools typically had 45 students per classroom while the parochial schools in Hamtramck had 70 students per classroom. In the early 1920s the annual growth rate of Hamtramck Public Schools buildings was 27% while non-public schools had an annual growth rate of 6% in that period. In the 1920s the Polish language became a part of the curriculum at Hamtramck Public Schools. In 1925 655 students attended Hamtramck High School. JoEllen McNergney Vinyard, author of For Faith and Fortune: The Education of Catholic Immigrants in Detroit, 1805-1925, wrote that Hamtramck High had "substantially more students than were in all of Detroit's Polish Catholic high schools combined."

In the 1920s Hamtramck families often sent their children to public school for Kindergarten due to convenience, then moved their children to parochial schools during the periods with the most important religious instruction. Therefore, the age group 7 to 12 had the largest Catholic school enrollment. After the critical period ended, many students returned to public school. In 1925 the public schools had 1,467 students of ages 14–15 while the non-public schools had 217 students aged 14 and 15.

In a period in the 20th Century, 8% of HPS teachers were Polish.

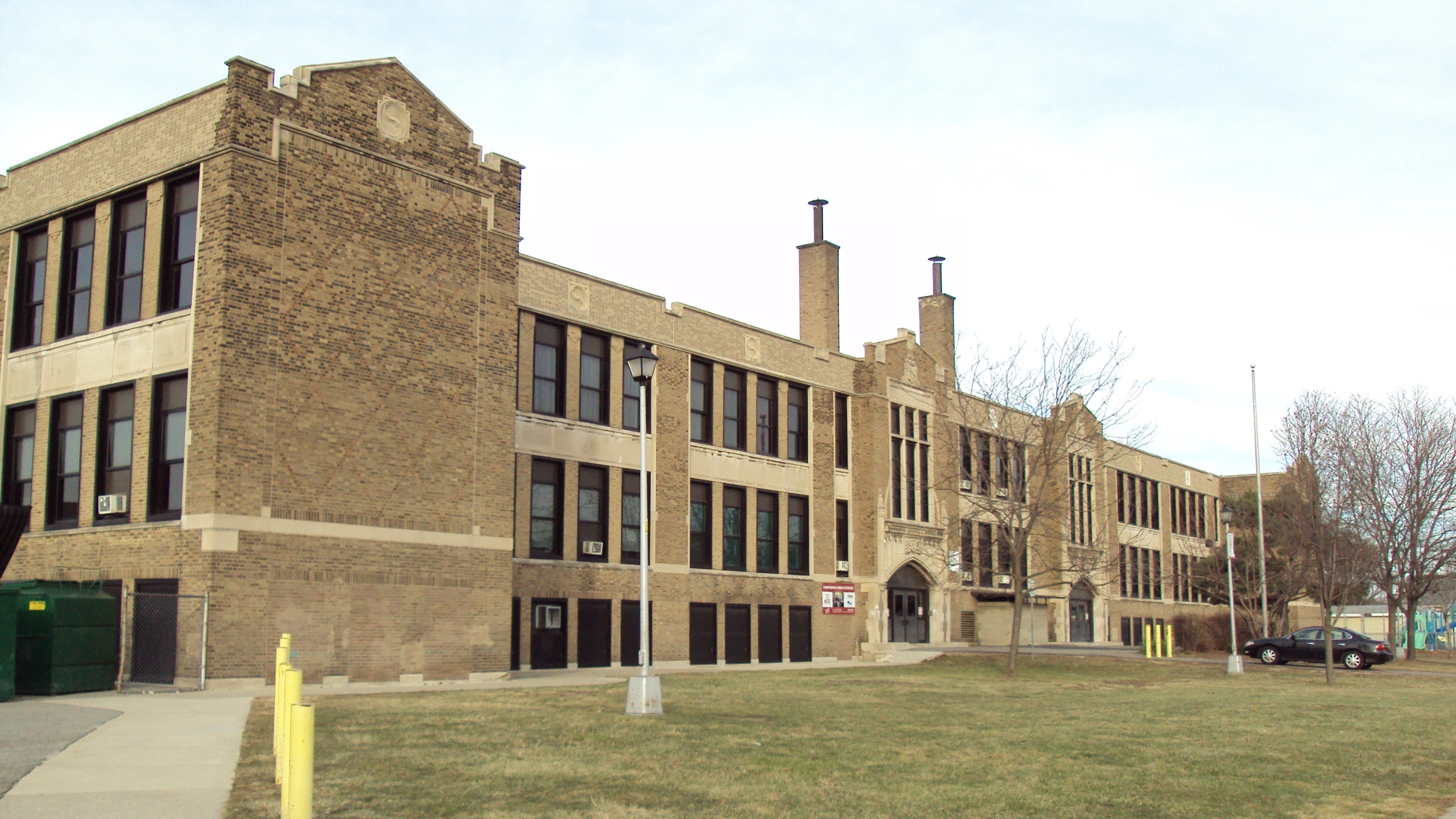
Kosciuszko Middle School

In February 2003 the district had an annual budget of $35 million and had 3,800 students.

In April 2003, George Ward, a former assistant prosecutor with the government of Wayne County, Michigan, investigated the spending practices of the district. The investigation described how the district spent $80,003 and took 18 months to build the Veterans Memorial Park picnic pavilion. It originally had been purchased as a picnic shelter kit at a home-improvement chain store for $2,000.

In 2003, a five-year plan for the improvement of the district was revealed. The Detroit News, that year, described the district as "troubled".

In June 2004 the Detroit News called the financial situation of the district "troubled". On Thursday June 24, 2004, the Michigan Department of Education sent a team of academic and financial experts to conduct reviews of the school system. The Detroit News stated that under Michigan law, the first step for the state to take in order to take over the operations of a school district would be to conduct a financial review. Martin Ackley, who served as the spokesperson for Tom Watkins, the State Superintendent of Education, argued that the move was not a state takeover but rather something he referred to as "state assistance."

In 2005 the openings of charter schools had reduced the enrollment at the Hamtramck district schools. That year, Paul Stamatakis, the superintendent, stated that a committee was researching how viable it would be for the school district to provide classes for the Arabic and Bengali languages. This was an effort to retain its Arab and Muslim students. In 2005 the district had a funding-per-pupil of $6,700 per year per, the lowest in the state. This compares to the funding-per-pupil of $7,100 per year of Detroit Public Schools. M. Kay Siblani of The Arab American News wrote that "Declining enrollment, rising costs and inadequate state funding are straining the system almost beyond repair."

In 2008 officials from the district announced that they planned to offer vocational programs such as building trades, culinary arts, and computer training and to expand adult education.

== Demographics ==
As of the 2013-2014 school year the district had 3,078 students from 23 countries of origin. Fewer than 45% of students have English as a primary language. As of 2013, the most common non-English languages spoken in the district are Bengali, Arabic, Bosnian, and Albanian. 45% of the students are Arabic-speaking.

In the 2008-2009 school year the district had 2,873 K-12 students, 69 preschool students and 281 adult/community education students from 23 countries of origin. 85% of the students were enrolled in free or reduced lunch. The main primary languages of students were English, Bengali (21.8%), Arabic (18.8%), Bosnian (7.5%), Polish (2.4%) and Albanian (1.5%).

As of 2001, 900 registered students who spoke Bengali and Urdu attended Hamtramck Public Schools.

Sally Howell, author of "Competing for Muslims: New Strategies for Urban Renewal in Detroit", wrote that "It is difficult to find educators in Hamtramck who speak positively about the challenges this diversity creates. Yet the public schools, overtaxed by non-English-language communities and riddled with ethnic tension among teens, are nonetheless eager to prevent the loss of their Muslim students to charter schools, or to Highland Park."

== School uniforms ==
Beginning on September 8, 2009, students in grades 1-8 in the district will be required to wear school uniforms. Beginning in 2010, high school students also had to wear school uniforms.

== Schools ==
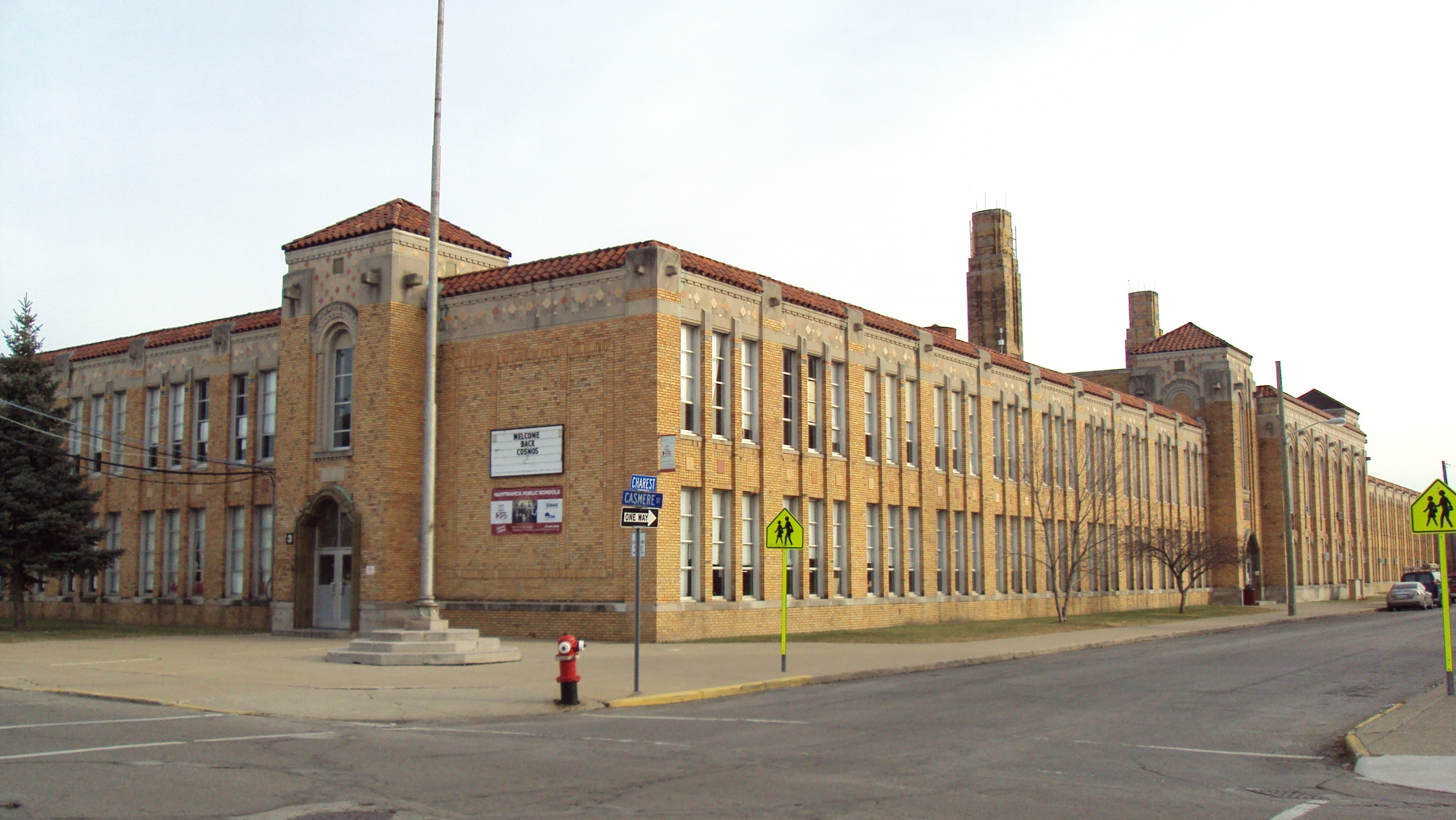
Hamtramck High School

=== High school ===
- Grades 9-12
  - Hamtramck High School
  - Horizon High School (alternative)

=== K-8 ===
  - Kosciuzsko Middle School/Dickinson West
    - It was named after Thaddeus Kosciuszko. It has about 400 students. It became a middle school in the 1970s; previously it was an elementary school.

=== Elementary schools ===
- Grades 1-6
  - Dickinson East Elementary School
  - Dickinson West Elementary School - housed in the same building as Kosciusko, but most classes are in detached modular buildings.
- Grades K-8
  - Holbrook Elementary School
    - Holbrook is Hamtramck's oldest school. It was named after the family of Dewitt C. Holbrook. The Hamtramck Planning Commission dedicated a plot of land towards constructing a school on June 26, 1891. By 1896 a frame schoolhouse had opened. In 1896 the school administration had three rooms added to the brick school building. During that year, 350 students attended the school. The number of students steadily increased from 1901 to 1903. An extension opened in 1913. In the 1920s, a fire destroyed the school's third floor. The school never had the floor rebuilt. The school was remodeled in 1929. The school website states, "Improvements in the buildings heating system and lighting have occurred, but for the most part, the building remains the same today as it did in 1929."
  - Tau Beta Elementary - opened 2017 in a 100-year-old building formerly the hall of the Tau Beta society.
- Pre-School-1
  - Early Childhood Center

=== Defunct schools ===
- Carpenter Elementary School - This school has been razed.
- Copernicus Elementary/Middle School - Present-day location of Hamtramck High School.
- (Old) Hamtramck High School - Hamtramck used to be housed in an older building along Wyandotte & Hewitt streets, until it moved to Copernicus in 1970—this school has since been razed.
- Pilsudski Elementary School - This school has been razed (closed)
- Pulaski Elementary School - This school has been razed.

== See also ==
- List of school districts in Michigan
