= Robert Kozaren =

American politician

Mayor of Hamtramck, Michigan
- In office 1980–1997

Personal details
- Born: Robert William Kozaren; June 5, 1934 Detroit, Michigan, United States
- Died: 2007 (aged 72–73) United States
- Party: Democratic

Robert William Kozaren (June 5, 1934 – 2007) was an American Democratic politician who served as mayor of the city of Hamtramck, Michigan, from 1980 to 1997. Elected to nine terms, he was the longest-serving mayor of Hamtramck.

Kozaren was born in Detroit, Michigan. Kozaren was president of the city council (and a former deputy city clerk) when he entered the primary for the mayoral election in the fall of 1979. At the time, Hamtramck came to symbolize the Rust Belt. He beat the sitting mayor "with a message of hope and renewal". At 6 feet 6 inches (1.98 m), Kozaren was an impressive figure walking down the street and enjoyed being personable with the people of his town. His enthusiasm and people skills were cited as a reason for his success at the polls and his eighteen-year reign as mayor.
