= Polish Wedding =

- Film poster
- Directed by: Theresa Connelly
- Written by: Theresa Connelly
- Produced by: Nick Wechsler
- Starring: Gabriel Byrne; Lena Olin; Claire Danes; Adam Trese; Mili Avital; Daniel Lapaine; Rade Šerbedžija
- Cinematography: Guy Dufaux
- Edited by: Curtiss Clayton; Suzanne Fenn
- Music by: Luis Bacalov
- Production companies: Fox Searchlight Pictures; Lakeshore Entertainment
- Distributed by: 20th Century Fox
- Release date: July 17, 1998
- Running time: 105 minutes
- Country: United States
- Language: English
- Box office: $692,588

Polish Wedding is a 1998 American comedy-drama film written and directed by Theresa Connelly. It was screened at the Sundance Film Festival on January 16, 1998 and Berlin International Film Festival on February 12. It was released in the U.S. on July 17.

It takes place within the then-Polish American community of Hamtramck, Michigan (the childhood home of director Theresa Connelly) at some time between the 1950s and 1970s. The interior of the family's home was shot in a local house on Wyandotte Street in Hamtramck. The St. Florian Church was used as a backdrop. Virtually all of the characters are Polish Americans, though the actors playing them are mostly of other ethnic origins. Kristen Bell appears in an uncredited role, making this her film debut.

== Plot ==
Jadzia is the matriarch of a family of five children, four sons and a daughter. The household also includes eldest son Ziggy's Syrian-American wife Sofie, who works with Jadzia as a cleaner, and Ziggy and Sofie's baby.

Jadzia is somewhat-happily married to Bolek, a baker whom she married after she got pregnant at 15, but she has also been having a long-term secret relationship with Roman. Her sole daughter Hala is a high-school dropout, so Jadzia expects her to help around the house.

The flirtatious Hala catches the eye of neighborhood police officer Russell Schuster, who knows her middle brothers, Kaz and Witek. There is a mutual attraction and they have sex one night, though Russell has second thoughts. At church on Sunday, Russell has difficulty keeping his eyes off Hala. After the service, they kiss on the church steps.

When Jadzia arrives home late, she finds her key doesn't work in the back door. Starting to sneak in through a basement window she bumps into Hala, who's sneaking out. Before Jadzia can hit her, Hala blurts out to not hurt her baby.

The next day, Hala is at their Catholic church, as the priest had chosen her for a special activity, because of her supposed purity. Jadzia confronts her, so she leaves.

Jadzia and Sofie make Hala put on Sofie's wedding dress to pressure Russell into marrying her. She gets him to take her out on his motorcycle and they have sex again, but he refuses to marry her. When Hala sneaks in through the basement window, Bolek sees and follows close behind. They have cigs with Hala's youngest brother Kris, then Bolek goes out the window, sees Jadzia, and follows her. She goes to Roman's, and Bolek is devastated to see her with him.

After they make love, Roman surprises Jadzia with two tickets to Paris, wanting the two of them to run away together. She refuses because of her family responsibilities, and when he asks her why she's with him, she leaves. Marching home at dawn, she rallies her sons to go with her to the Schusters' and demand that Russell take responsibility for impregnating Hala. Kris gets Bolek to help, but he quickly directs his anger from Russell towards Jadzia.

Bolek chases Jadzia home, almost hits her, then locks the door behind him. That night they make up by making love. In the morning, the whole family is in the kitchen when Jadzia and Bolek seemingly have a fight, but Hala finds them happily together in the pantry.

The next day, at the Polish-American Catholic church ceremony, a youth shouts out to jeer that Hala is hardly an example of virginal purity as she's single and pregnant. The priest is about to strike her when Jadzia stops him.

One year later, Hala and Russell are at her Polish family home, together happily with their baby.

== Cast ==
- Claire Danes as Hala
- Jon Bradford as Sailor
- Adam Trese as Russell Schuster
- Lena Olin as Jadzia
- Ramsey Krull as Kris
- Gabriel Byrne as Bolek
- Seamus McNally as Heckler
- Daniel Lapaine as Ziggy
- Rachel and Rebecca Morrin as Ziggy's and Sofie's Baby
- Mili Avital as Sofie
- Steven Petrarca as Witek
- Brian Hoyt as Kaz
- Christina Romana Lypeckyj as Kasia
- Peter Carey as Piotrus
- Rade Šerbedžija as Roman
- Ryan Spahn as Kid
- Kristen Bell as a teenage girl (uncredited)

== Reception ==
On Rotten Tomatoes the film has an approval rating of 42% based on reviews from 36 critics. The website's critics consensus reads, "An awkward mix of drama and comedy lacks any genuine emotion."

Emanuel Levy of Variety said that the film was "a disjointedly messy movie that plods along until it reaches its predestined conclusion."

== Home media ==
The region 1 DVD was released March 16, 1999.
