= Hamtramck, Michigan =

- City
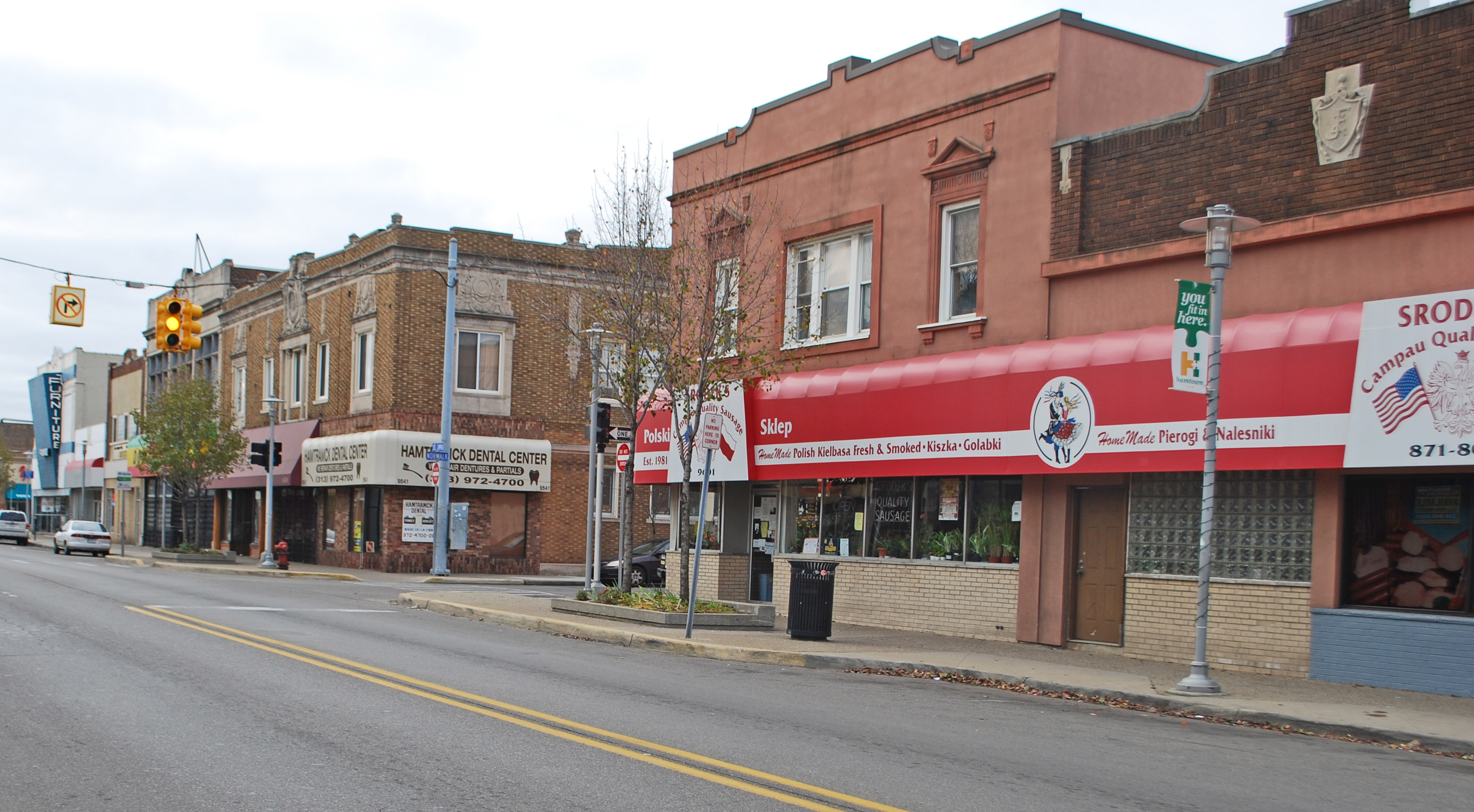
- Downtown Hamtramck in 2012

- Flag Seal
- Nicknames: The World in Two Square Miles, Hamtown
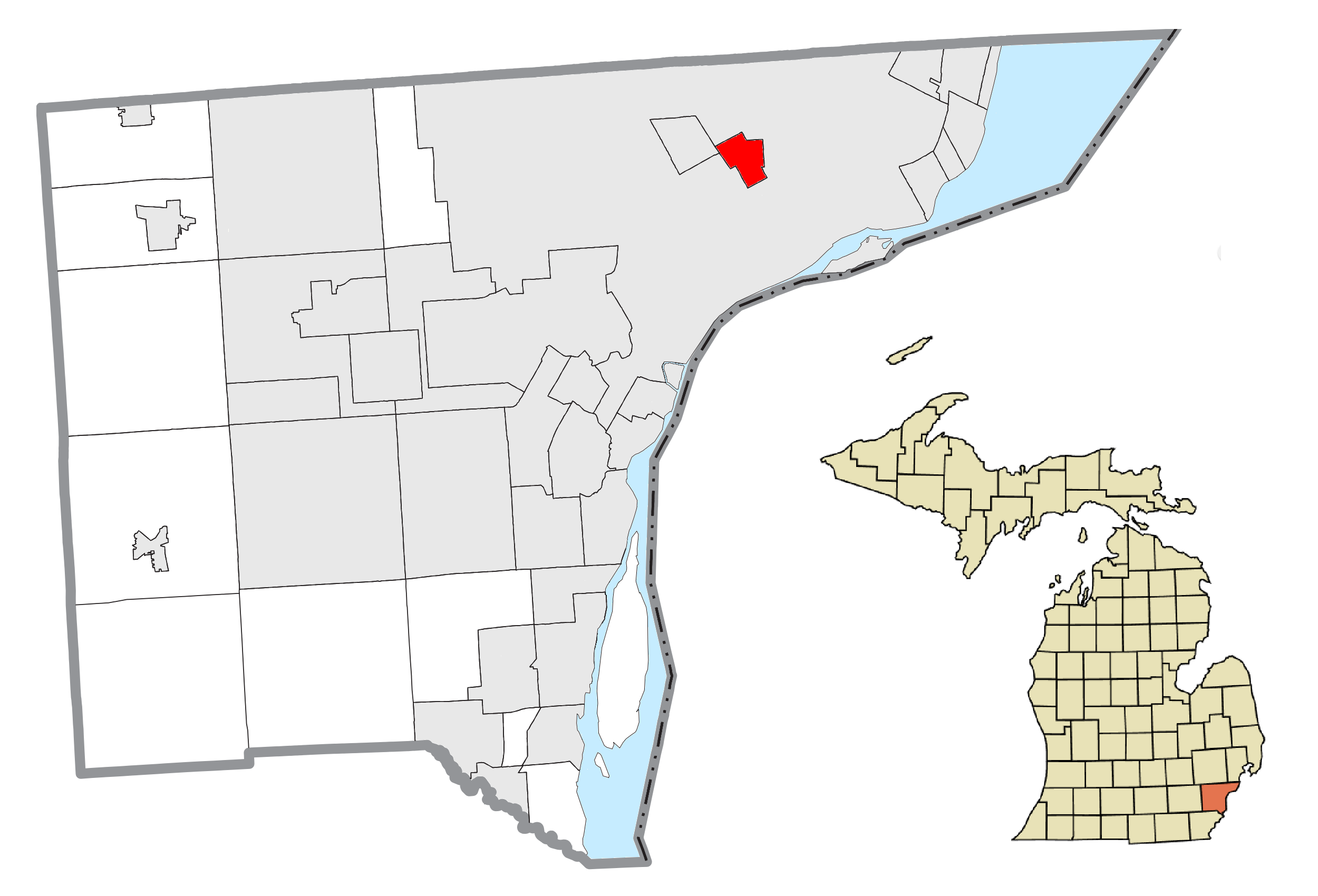
- Location in Wayne County and the state of Michigan

- Location in the United States
- Coordinates: 42°23′34″N 83°02′59″W
- Country: United States
- State: Michigan
- County: Wayne
- Organized: 1798
- Incorporated (town): 1901
- Incorporated (city): 1922

Government
  - Type: Mayor–council
  - Mayor: Adam Alharbi
  - City manager: Max Garbarino

Area
  - Total: 2.090 sq mi (5.413 km^{2})
  - Land: 2.090 sq mi (5.413 km^{2})
  - Water: 0 sq mi (0.000 km^{2})
- Elevation: 630 ft (192 m)

Population (2020)
  - Total: 28,433
  - Estimate (2023): 27,339
  - Density: 13,080/sq mi (5,051/km^{2})
- Time zone: UTC−05:00 (EST)
  - Summer (DST): UTC−04:00 (EDT)
- ZIP Codes: 48211, 48212
- Area code: 313
- FIPS code: 26-36280
- GNIS feature ID: 0627707
- Sales tax: 6.0%
- Website: hamtramckcity.gov

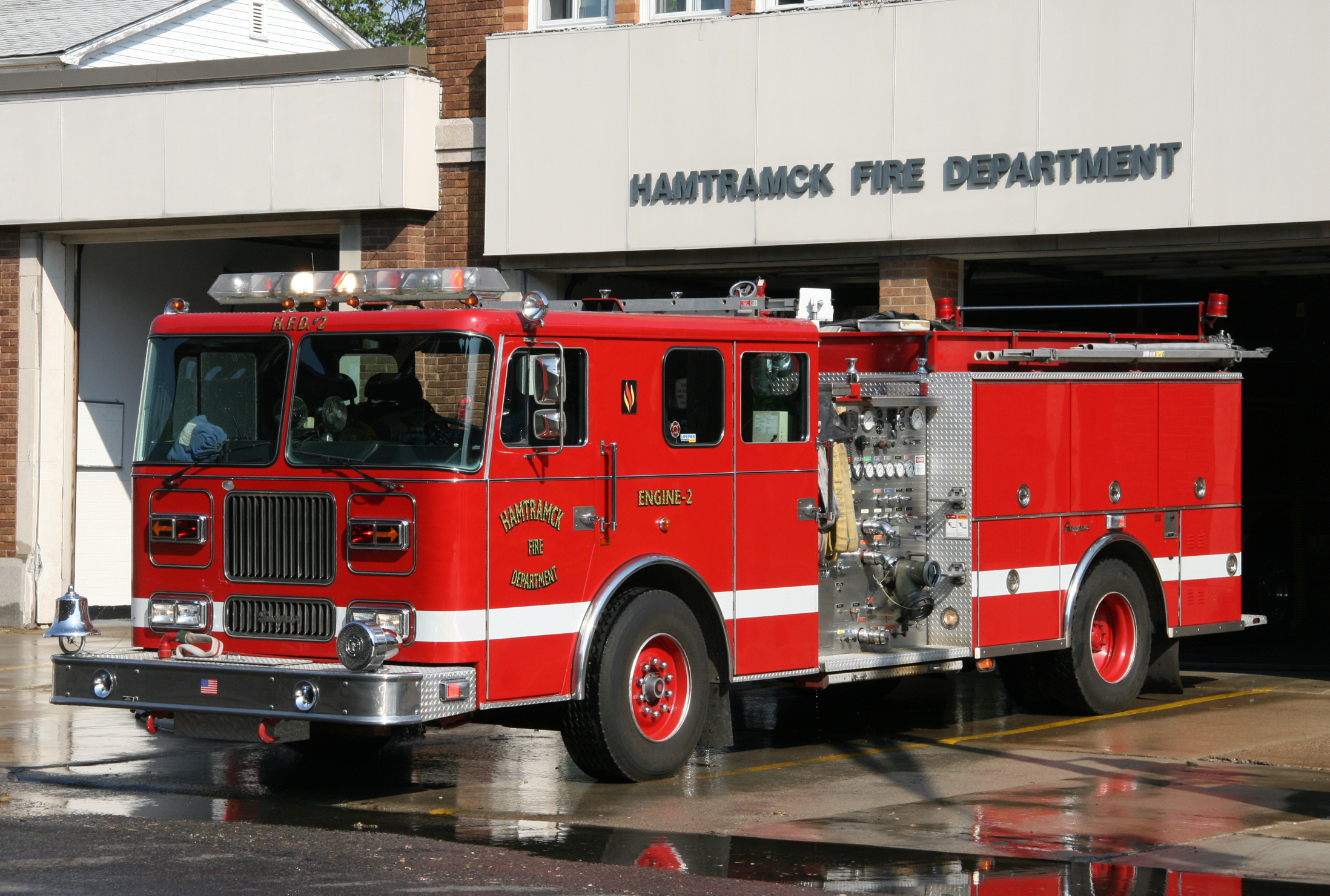
Hamtramck Fire Department

Hamtramck (/hæmˈtræmɪk/ ham-TRAM-ik) is a city in Wayne County in the U.S. state of Michigan. Hamtramck is about 5 miles (8.0 km) north of downtown Detroit and is surrounded by Detroit on most sides. As of the 2020 census, the city had a population of 28,433 and was by far the most densely populated municipality in Michigan.

Known in the 20th century as a center of Polish-American life and culture, Hamtramck has since attracted new immigrants, especially from Yemen, Bangladesh, and Pakistan. In 2013, it reportedly became the first Muslim-majority city in the U.S. In 2015, Hamtramck became the first city to have a Muslim-majority city council in U.S history, with four of the six members being Muslim. In 2022, Hamtramck became the first city with a fully Muslim city council. Soon after in 2023, the city drew scrutiny for its ban of the rainbow flag on city property and perceived homophobia.

== Etymology ==
Hamtramck is named for the French-Canadian soldier Jean-François Hamtramck, the first American commander of Fort Shelby, the fortification at Detroit. It was originally known as Hamtramck Township.

== History ==
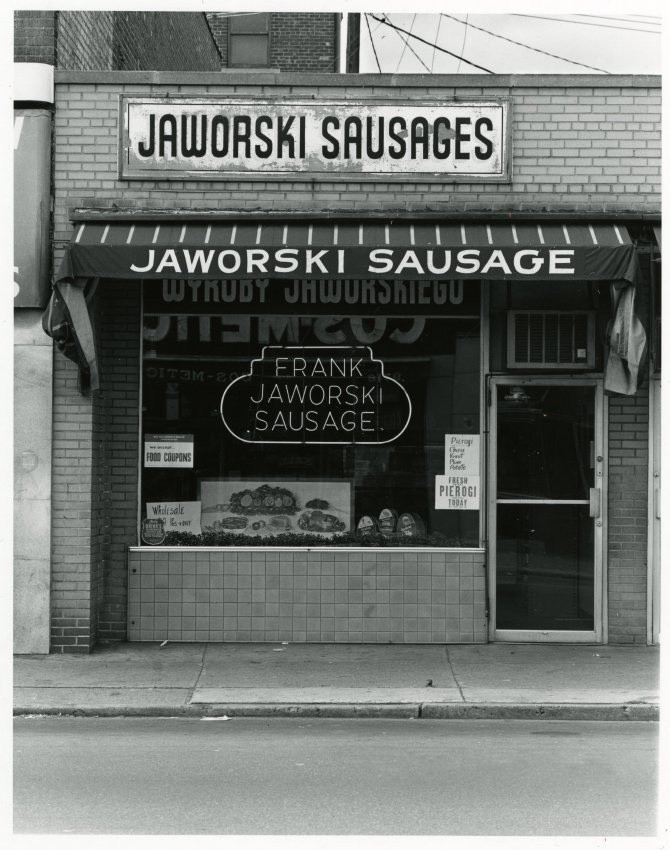
A sausage shop in Hamtramck in 1974

Hamtramck was originally settled by German farmers, but Polish immigrants moved into the area when the Dodge Brothers plant opened in 1914. Poles previously made up a large proportion of the population. It is sometimes confused with Poletown, a traditional Polish neighborhood, which used to lie mostly in the city of Detroit and includes a small part of Hamtramck. As of the 2010 American Community Survey, 14.5% of Hamtramck's population is of Polish origin whereas in 1970 it was 90% Polish.

In 1910 Hamtramck, then a village, had 3,559 residents. Between 1910 and 1920 Hamtramck's population grew by 1,266 percent. The growth of Hamtramck and neighboring Highland Park broke records for increases of population; both municipalities withstood annexation efforts from Detroit. Circa the 1920s and 1930s, people had bars active and publicly made them visible, which was against Prohibition.

Hamtramck was primarily farmland, although the Detroit Stove Works employed 1,300 workers to manufacture stoves. In 1901, part of the township incorporated as a village to gain more control over the settlement's affairs, and by 1922 the village was reincorporated as a city to fend off annexation attempts by the neighboring city of Detroit. By the mid-1920s, 78% of the residents of Hamtramck owned their own houses or were buying their houses. Around that time, the factory workers made up 85% of Hamtramck's heads of households. Of those factory workers, about 50% were categorized as not skilled workers. In 1910, the newly founded Dodge Main assembly plant created jobs for thousands of workers and led to additional millions of dollars in the city. Dodge Main quickly expanded and became important to Hamtramck. Before the construction of Dodge Main, Hamtramck was a largely rural town. The establishment of the Dodge Main assembly plant led to a large influx of Polish immigrants who pushed out the incumbent German politicians. It was after this that Hamtramck was considered a Polish-American town.

By the end of the 20th century and the closing of Dodge Main, followed closely by General Motors razing of key parts of the Polish neighborhoods, the ethnicity of the region quickly shifted from traditionally Polish descendants to new Middle Eastern and South Asian immigrants. By the elections of 2015, the city is suggested to have been the first to elect a Muslim-majority council in the country.

Over the past thirty years, a large number of Muslim immigrants from the Middle East (especially Yemen), South Asia, and the Balkans have moved to the city. As of the 2010 American Community Survey, the city's foreign born population stood at 41.1%, making it Michigan's most internationally diverse city (see more at Demographics below). The population was 43,355 in the 1950 Census and 18,372 in 1990.

In November 2021, Hamtramck elected a completely Muslim-American city council and a Muslim mayor, becoming the first municipality in the United States to be governed entirely by Muslim Americans. In 2023, the city drew scrutiny for its ban of the rainbow flag on city property and perceived homophobia.

== Geography ==
According to the United States Census Bureau, the city has an area of 2.090 square miles (5.41 km^{2}), all land.

Hamtramck is mostly surrounded by Detroit except for its small common border with Highland Park, which is also mostly surrounded by Detroit. Hamtramck is about 5 miles (8 km) from the center of Detroit. The I-75 freeway roughly runs along its western border, and I-94 runs near its southern border.

According to Keith Matheny of the Detroit Free Press, the urban layout assists recent immigrants who do not yet have the credentials to drive an automobile, as Hamtramck is "uniquely walkable" and a "tight size".

== Culture ==
Hamtramck flourished from 1910 to 1920 as thousands of European immigrants, particularly Poles, were attracted by the growing automobile industry. The city has grown increasingly ethnically diverse in subsequent years but still bears many reminders of its Polish ancestry in family names, street names and businesses. A 2018 survey found that Hamtramck schoolchildren spoke 16 native languages. A motto often associated with the city is "A League of Nations". Neal Rubin of The Detroit News wrote in 2010 that, despite the demographic changes, "In a lot of ways, Hamtramck still feels like a Polish enclave."

In 1987, Detroit television station WDIV ran an episode of a local sitcom called Hamtramck, created by local radio personalities Tom Ryan and Tom De Lisle, with a cameo by Detroit Tigers manager Sparky Anderson. It received poor reviews and was protested by many Polish Americans, and was canceled before another episode aired.

After six decades of double-digit percentage declines in population between 1930 and 1990, Hamtramck's population began to grow in the 1990s. It fell slightly between 2000 and 2010 but grew 26% in the 2010s, surpassing 28,000. These large gains were despite a small decrease in households since 1980.

The 8,000-square-foot (740 m^{2}) Hamtramck Historical Museum and the Polish Art Center are next door to each other.

In 1997, the Utne Reader named Hamtramck one of "the 15 hippest neighborhoods in the U.S. and Canada" in part for its punk and alternative music scene, its Buddhist temple, its cultural diversity, and its laid-back blue-collar neighborhoods. In 2003, Maxim Blender selected Hamtramck as the second "Most Rock N' Roll City" in the U.S., behind Williamsburg in Brooklyn, New York City. Hamtramck is home of several of Michigan's most distinguished music venues.

In January 2004, members of the Al-Islah Islamic Center requested permission to use loudspeakers to broadcast the Islamic call to prayer. This set off a contentious debate about the noise, which garnered national attention. In July, Hamtramck amended its noise ordinance, allowing the prayer calls to be broadcast.

Hamtramck Disneyland is an art installation in the city built on two garages out of metal.

=== Hamtramck festivals ===
==== Pączki Day ====
Polish immigrants and residents of Hamtramck and southeastern Michigan celebrate Tłusty Wtorek (Fat Tuesday), known locally as Pączki Day, by lining up at the city's numerous Polish bakeries to purchase pączki. On Pączki Day, several local bars host parties with live entertainment and free pączki.

==== Hamtramck Music Festival ====
The "Hamtramck Music Festival" is an annual Independent music festival held in March in Hamtramck. In 2011, almost 200 bands played the Blowout at 14 venues over four days.

==== St. Florian Strawberry Festival ====
Held annually in the first weekend in May at grounds at St. Florian Church.

==== Hamtramck Labor Day Festival ====
The Hamtramck Labor Day Festival is held on Labor Day weekend, ending with the Polish Day Parade on Labor Day. The festival includes live music on two stages, a carnival area, beer, and food tents extending the half-mile (1 km) stretch of Joseph Campau Street, from Caniff to Carpenter.

==== Pride 365 launch and protest ====
In response to a decision by the city council to ban pride flags on city flagpoles, multiple LGBT activist groups organized into a coalition.

==== Planet Ant Film & Video Festival ====
Held at the Planet Ant Theater, the festival celebrates independent movies and the people who make them, featuring comedies, dramas, documentaries, animation and music videos.

== Economy ==
General Motors' Detroit/Hamtramck Assembly plant, one of the automaker's premiere facilities, produced the Chevrolet Volt, the Cadillac CT6, the Chevrolet Impala and the Buick Lacrosse; it was closed in March 2019, and retooled as Factory ZERO to build the upcoming GMC Hummer EV.

In April 2009, American Axle announced that it planned to close its plant at the Hamtramck/Detroit city limit, thus eliminating several hundred jobs in the area. As of February 2014, most of the 1.9 million-square-foot former facility has been demolished.

The Polish Art Center, at 9539 Joseph Campau Street, is a local institution in Hamtramck. The center promotes the preservation of Polish heritage through its display of cultural artifacts, often exhibited at festivals, schools and libraries. The center also hosts lectures, book signings, workshops, folk-art demonstrations, and pisanki-making classes.

The Ukrainian American Archives & Museum of Detroit is located at 9630 Joseph Campau Ave. It was formerly at 11756 Charest Street. The Museum's purpose is "to educate and inform the general public about the culture, art, and history of Ukrainians, their immigration to the United States and the contributions of Americans of Ukrainian descent to America; to engage in research in these areas; to maintain archives for the deposit of documents and other records relating to these topics; to acquire, preserve, exhibit artifacts of artistic, historical, and scientific value relating to these subjects; to sponsor public programs in order to study and preserve the heritage of Ukrainian Americans."

For more than 85 years, Kowalski Sausage Co. has manufactured meat products at 2270 Holbrook Street, which are distributed in the metropolitan Detroit area.

Notwithstanding the statement in the credits that it was filmed "in Detroit, Michigan", the 1998 Indie film Polish Wedding was filmed mainly in Hamtramck, particularly at a house on Wyandotte Street. Theresa Connelly, who wrote and directed the film, had spent her childhood in Hamtramck.

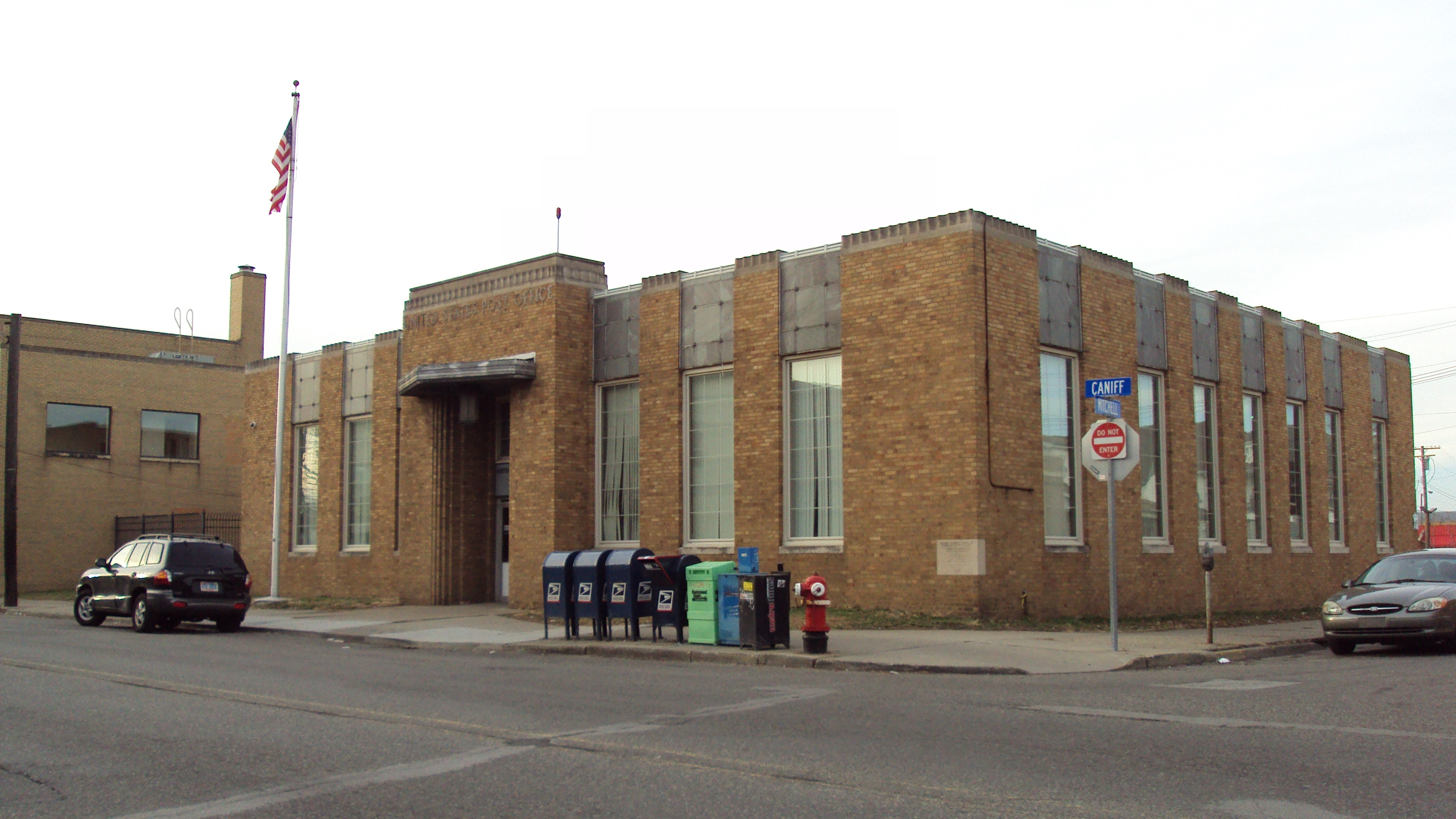
Hamtramck Post Office

In 2010, citing general budget woes and the city of Detroit withholding a portion of shared revenue for the Detroit/Hamtramck Assembly plant straddling the cities' border, Hamtramck requested that the State of Michigan allow it to declare bankruptcy. The request was denied. Receivership was avoided when a deal was struck between Hamtramck and Detroit that required Detroit to pay $3.2 million in collected taxes to Hamtramck and Hamtramck to pay Detroit nearly the same amount for a water and sewage bill that was in arrears.

The United States Postal Service operates the Hamtramck Post Office at 2933 Caniff Street. The post office annex is at 14600 Dequindre Street in Detroit.

== Sports ==
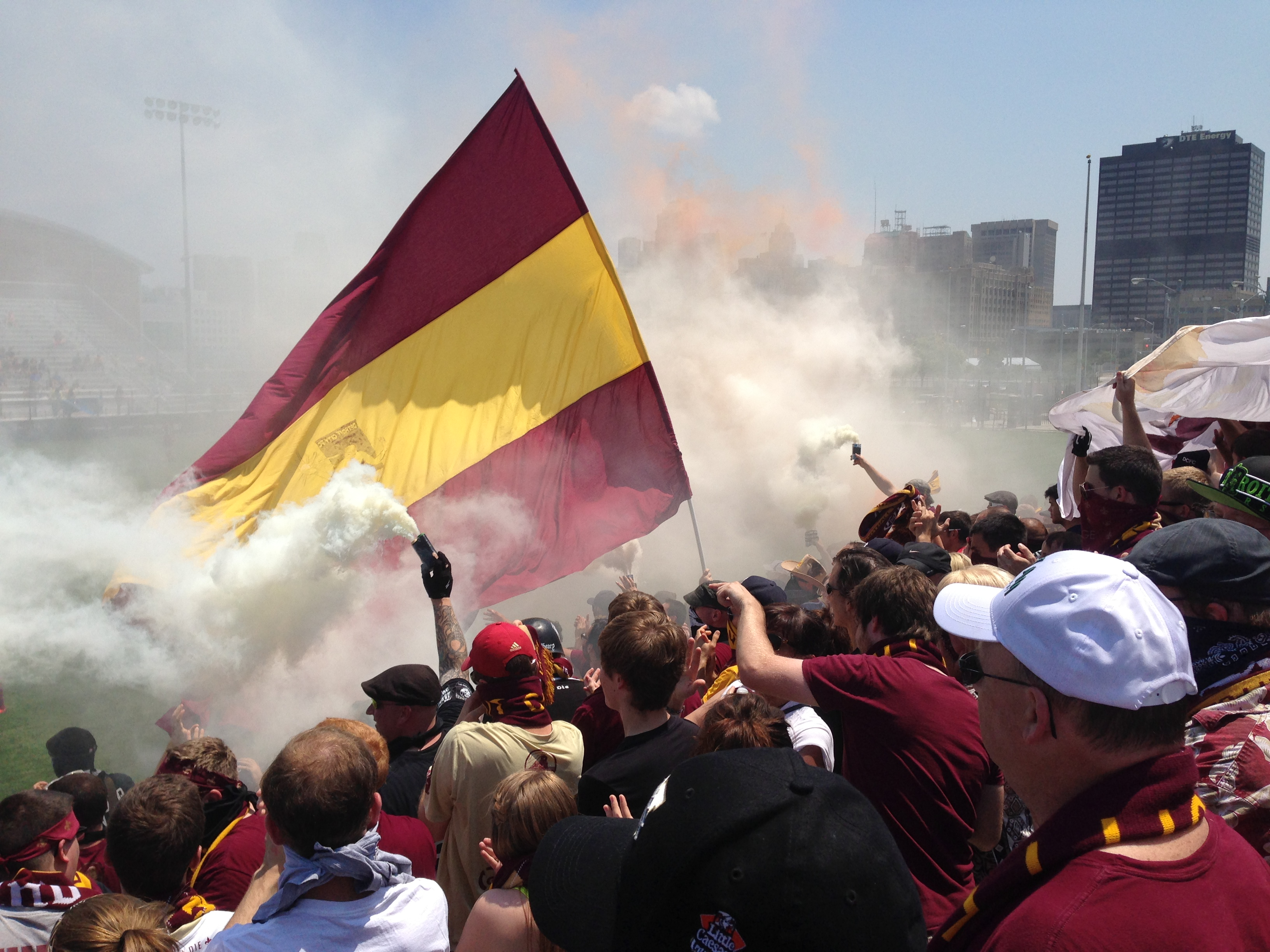
Detroit City FC supporters in the Cass Tech High School football stadium

Hamtramck is home to Detroit City FC (DCFC), a professional American soccer club that plays in United Soccer League Championship (USLC), the second tier of the American Soccer Pyramid. The club plays their home matches at Keyworth Stadium, which is owned by Hamtramck Public Schools. The club, which was mainly managed by Trevor James, who was a former Ipswich Town F.C. player who later was an assistant coach and scout under Bobby Robson, is now managed by Danny Dichio, who was a former Toronto FC player who later was an assistant coach for Sacramento Republic FC, another USLC team.

A Little League team from Hamtramck won the 1959 Little League World Series.

== Demographics ==
Historical population
Census	Pop.	Note	%±
1910	3,559		—
1920	48,615		1,266.0%
1930	56,268		15.7%
1940	49,839		−11.4%
1950	43,555		−12.6%
1960	34,137		−21.6%
1970	26,783		−21.5%
1980	21,300		−20.5%
1990	18,372		−13.7%
2000	22,976		25.1%
2010	22,423		−2.4%
2020	28,433		26.8%
2023 (est.)	27,339		−3.8%
U.S. Decennial Census; 2020 Census

=== Racial and ethnic composition ===
Hamtramck city, Michigan – Racial and ethnic composition Note: the US Census treats Hispanic/Latino as an ethnic category. This table excludes Latinos from the racial categories and assigns them to a separate category. Hispanics/Latinos may be of any race.
Race / ethnicity (NH = Non-Hispanic)	Pop 2000	Pop 2010	Pop 2020	% 2000	% 2010	% 2020
White alone (NH)	13,872	11,876	15,829	60.38%	52.96%	55.67%
Black or African American alone (NH)	3,430	4,285	2,814	14.93%	19.11%	9.90%
Native American or Alaska Native alone (NH)	88	58	36	0.38%	0.26%	0.13%
Asian alone (NH)	2,377	4,806	7,627	10.35%	21.43%	26.82%
Native Hawaiian or Pacific Islander alone (NH)	23	2	7	0.10%	0.01%	0.02%
Other race alone (NH)	198	66	190	0.86%	0.29%	0.67%
Mixed-race or multiracial (NH)	2,688	1,002	1,609	11.70%	4.47%	5.66%
Hispanic or Latino (any race)	300	328	321	1.31%	1.46%	1.13%
Total	22,976	22,423	28,433	100.00%	100.00%	100.00%

=== 2020 census ===
As of the 2020 census, Hamtramck had a population of 28,433 and 8,139 households, including 5,661 families; the population density was 13,604.3 inhabitants per square mile (5,252.6/km^{2}).

The median age was 27.7 years. 33.3% of residents were under the age of 18, including 9.1% under 5 years of age, and 7.8% were 65 years of age or older. For every 100 females there were 103.6 males, and for every 100 females age 18 and over there were 101.1 males age 18 and over.

100.0% of residents lived in urban areas, while 0.0% lived in rural areas.

There were 8,139 households in Hamtramck, of which 47.2% had children under the age of 18 living in them. Of all households, 48.7% were married-couple households, 23.0% were households with a male householder and no spouse or partner present, and 24.4% were households with a female householder and no spouse or partner present. About 24.0% of all households were made up of individuals and 7.6% had someone living alone who was 65 years of age or older.

There were 8,911 housing units, of which 8.7% were vacant. The homeowner vacancy rate was 1.2% and the rental vacancy rate was 6.4%.

Racial composition as of the 2020 census
Race	Number	Percent
White	15,905	55.9%
Black or African American	2,851	10.0%
American Indian and Alaska Native	42	0.1%
Asian	7,647	26.9%
Native Hawaiian and Other Pacific Islander	7	0.0%
Some other race	275	1.0%
Two or more races	1,706	6.0%

39.2% of the population reported Middle Eastern or North African ancestry. The most reported ancestries were:

- Yemeni (25.5%)
- Bangladeshi (14.5%)
- Indian (11.7%)
- Arab (11.1%)
- African American (6.6%)
- Polish (5%)
- Bosnian and Herzegovinian (2.3%)
- Ukrainian (2.1%)
- English (2%)
- Irish (1.8%)

=== 2010 census ===
As of the 2010 census, there were 22,423 people, 7,063 households, and 5,115 families residing in the city. The population density was 10,751.0 inhabitants per square mile (4,151.0/km^{2}). There were 8,693 housing units at an average density of 4,159.3 per square mile (1,605.9/km^{2}). The racial makeup of the city was 53.5% White, 19.2% African American, 0.2% Native American, 21.5% Asian, 0.6% from other races, and 4.7% from two or more races. Hispanic or Latino residents of any race were 1.4% of the population.

There were 7,063 households, of which 43.2% had children under the age of 18 living with them, 40.3% were married couples living together, 18.1% had a female householder with no husband present, 7.0% had a male householder with no wife present, and 34.7% were non-families. 28.9% of all households were made up of individuals, and 9.2% had someone living alone who was 65 years of age or older. The average household size was 3.09 and the average family size was 3.98.

The median age in the city was 28.8 years. 31.7% of residents were under the age of 18; 12.2% were between the ages of 18 and 24; 27.9% were from 25 to 44; 20.7% were from 45 to 64; and 7.7% were 65 years of age or older. The gender makeup of the city was 51.6% male and 48.4% female.

=== 2000 census ===
As of the 2000 census, there were 22,976 people, 8,033 households, and 4,851 families residing in the city. The population density was 10,900.5 per square mile (4,208.7/km^{2}), making it the most densely populated city in Michigan. There were 8,894 housing units at an average density of 4,219.6 per square mile (1,629.2/km^{2}). The racial makeup of the city was 60.96% White (which includes people of Middle Eastern ancestry), 15.12% African American, 0.43% Native American, 10.37% Asian, 0.10% Pacific Islander, 1.14% from other races, and 11.89% from two or more races. Hispanic or Latino residents of any race were 1.31% of the population.

In the 2000 census, major ancestry groups reported by Hamtramck residents were as follows:

- Bangladeshi 19.7%
- Pakistani 11.0%
- Polish 10.9%
- Arab (excluding Iraqi and Lebanese) 9.2%
- Macedonian 5.5%
- Indian 5.4%
- Black or African American 5.1%
- Ukrainian 3.2%
- Albanian 2.8%
- Irish 2.2%
- German 1.9%
- Italian 1.8%
- Russian 1.4%
- English 1.1%
- French (excluding the Basques) 0.8%
- Lebanese 0.7%
- Scottish 0.7%
- Iraqi 0.5%
- Yugoslav 0.5%
- Mexican 0.2%

3.1% of Hamtramck's population reported Albanian ancestry. This made it the second most Albanian place in the United States by percentage of the population, second only to Fairview, North Carolina.

There were 8,033 households, out of which 33.3% had children under the age of 18 living with them, 37.3% were married couples living together, 16.1% had a female householder with no husband present, and 39.6% were non-families. 32.2% of all households were made up of individuals, and 13.3% had someone living alone who was 65 years of age or older. The average household size was 2.74 and the average family size was 3.59.

In the city, 27.8% of the population was under the age of 18, 10.8% was between 18 and 24, 31.9% 25 through 44, 17.7% 45 through 64, and 11.9% was 65 years of age or older. The median age was 32 years. For every 100 females, there were 110.4 males. For every 100 females age 18 and over, there were 109.6 males.

The median income for a household in the city was $26,616, and the median income for a family was $30,496. Males had a median income of $29,368 versus $22,346 for females. The per capita income for the city was $12,691. About 24.1% of families and 27.0% of the population were below the poverty line, including 36.9% of those under age 18 and 18.1% of those age 65 or over.

From 1990 to 2000, the city's population increased by 25%. Sally Howell, author of "Competing for Muslims: New Strategies for Urban Renewal in Detroit", wrote that this was "overwhelmingly" due to immigration from majority Muslim countries.

From 1990 to 2000, of all of the municipalities in Wayne, Oakland, and Macomb counties, Hamtramck had the highest percentage growth in the Asian population. It had 222 Asians according to the 1990 U.S. Census and 2,382 according to the 2000 U.S. Census, an increase of 973%.

=== Ethnic groups ===
Historically, Hamtramck received a lot of immigration from Eastern Europe. In the 20th century, Hamtramck was mostly Polish. George Tysh of the Metro Times wrote, "In the early days of the auto industry, Hamtramck's population swelled with Poles, so much so that you were more likely to hear Polish spoken on Joseph Campau than any other tongue." Later waves of immigration brought Albanians, Bosnians, Macedonians, Ukrainians, and Yemenis. By 2001 many Bangladeshis, Bosnians, and Iraqi Assyrians were moving to Hamtramck. As of 2011 almost one in five Hamtramck residents was Asian (excluding those from southwest Asia). As of 2003, over 30 languages are spoken in Hamtramck and more than four religions are present. The four principle religions are Islam, Christianity, Hinduism, and Buddhism.

In 2013, the city's Human Relations Commission facilitated the raising of flags of 18 countries from which Hamtramck residents emigrated. They are displayed on Joseph Campau Street, with a U.S. flag flying at either end.

==== Bangladeshi people ====
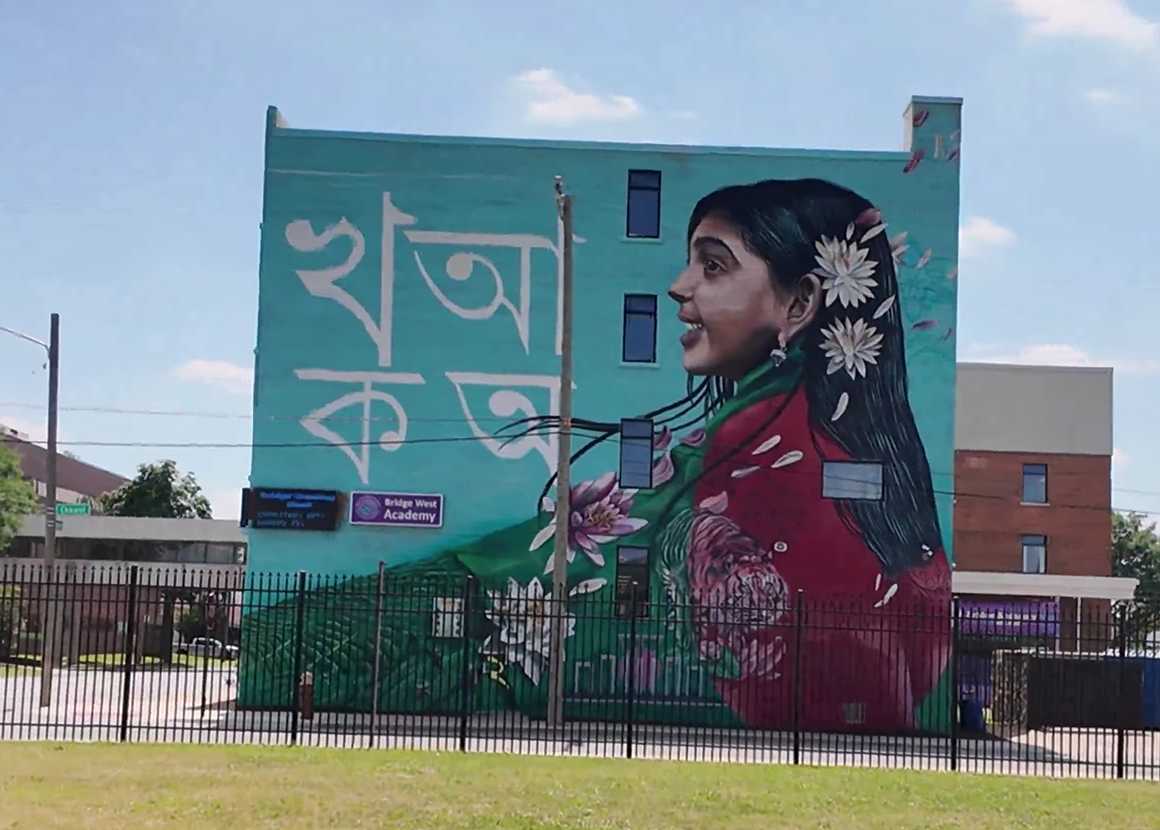
Bengali mural by Victor "Marka27" Quiñonez

In the 1930s, the first group of Bengalis settled in Detroit and Hamtramck. The first significant population of Bengalis began arriving in the late 1980s and the Bengalis became a large part of the city's population in the 1990s. The community saw its greatest growth in the 1990s and 2000s. By 2001 many Bangladeshi Americans had moved from New York City, particularly Astoria, Queens, to Hamtramck and Detroit's east side. Factors contributing this included lower cost of living, more spacious houses, employment opportunities, and the presence of a large Muslim community in Metro Detroit. Many Bangladeshi Americans moved into Queens, and then onwards to Metro Detroit.

In 2002, over 80% of the Bangladeshi population within Wayne, Oakland, and Macomb counties lived in Hamtramck and some surrounding neighborhoods in Detroit. That area overall had almost 1,500 ethnic Bangladeshis. Almost 75% of Bangladeshi Michiganders live in Hamtramck.

By 2002, a Bengali business district formed along Conant Avenue and some residents called it "Little Bengal". The district, along Caniff and Conant streets, included markets, stores, mosques, and bakeries owned by Bangladeshis, Indians, and Pakistanis. By 2008 the Bengali business district, between Davison and Harold Street, and partially within the city limits of Detroit, received the honorary title "Bangladesh Avenue" and was to be dedicated as such on November 8, 2008. Akikul H. Shamin, the president of the Bangladesh Association of Michigan, estimated that Bangladeshi people operate 80% of the buildings and businesses in the portion of Conant Avenue. As of February 2008 the city planned to erect signage reading "Bangladesh Town" in the business district.

In 2002, the estimate of Hamtramck's South Asian population was from 7,000 to 10,000. As of 2001, 900 registered students who spoke Bengali and Urdu attended Hamtramck Public Schools. Most Bangladeshis in Hamtramck originate from the north-eastern region of Sylhet in Bangladesh; therefore, most speak Sylheti.

As of 2014, there are over 13 Bengali clothing shops in the city.

==== Yemeni people ====
Yemeni mural by Dasic Fernandez

As of 2006, most of the Middle Eastern population in Hamtramck is Yemeni. Hakim Almasmari wrote in 2006 that "Several streets seem to be populated exclusively by Yemeni Americans, and Yemeni culture pervades the city's social, business, and political life." Many Yemeni restaurants are in Hamtramck, and the Yemeni community operates the Mu'ath bin Jabal Mosque (Arabic: مسجد معاذ بن جبل), which was established in 1976. In 2005 the mosque, located just outside the southeastern border of Hamtramck, was the largest mosque out of the ten within a three-mile radius. Sally Howell, author of "Competing for Muslims: New Strategies for Urban Renewal in Detroit", wrote that the mosque "has been credited" by public officials and area Muslims "with having turned around one of Detroit's roughest neighborhoods at the height of the crack cocaine epidemic of the 1980s, making its streets safe, revitalizing a dormant housing market, attracting new business to the area, and laying the foundation for an ethnically mixed, highly visible Muslim population in Detroit and Hamtramck."

According to Almasmari, some of the first Yemenis to have arrived in Hamtramck said that Yemeni people first arrived in Hamtramck in the 1960s. The "Building Islam in Detroit: Foundations/Forms/Futures" project of the University of Michigan stated that Yemenis began arriving in the 1970s.

In 2013 Dasic Fernandez, a Chilean artist, created a 90-foot (27 m) by 30-foot (9.1 m) mural on the Sheeba restaurant celebrating the Yemeni population. The mural depicts a girl in a veil decorated with the blue sky, a farmer wearing a turban, and a woman in a hijab. The Arab American and Chaldean Council and the coalition OneHamtramck commissioned the mural.

=== Religious and political issues ===
In the 2000s, a Bengali mosque named the Al-Islah Jamee Masjid asked for permission to broadcast the adhan, the Islamic call to prayer, from loudspeakers outside of the mosque, and requested permission to do so from the city government. It was one of the newer mosques in Hamtramck. Sally Howell, author of "Competing for Muslims: New Strategies for Urban Renewal in Detroit", wrote that the request "brought to a head simmering Islamophobic sentiments" in Hamtramck. Muslims and interfaith activists supported the mosque. Some anti-Muslim activists, including some from other states including Kentucky and Ohio, participated in the controversy. In 2004, the city council voted unanimously to allow mosques to broadcast the adhan on public streets, making it one of a few U.S. cities to do so. Some individuals had objected to the allowing of the adhan due to noise concerns.

In 2023, the Hamtramck city council approved animal slaughtering in households for Muslim religious purposes.

On June 13, 2023, the city council introduced a resolution prohibiting the display on city property of all flags but the U.S. flag and "nations' flags that represent the international character of [the] City", which many interpreted as an indirectly targeted ban of the rainbow flag on city property and sidewalks, which had previously generated some controversy. After three hours of public comment, the council passed the resolution unanimously. Mayor Amer Ghalib opposed displaying the pride flag, but former mayor Karen Majewski had supported displaying it. The council also voted to remove two commissioners of the Hamtramck Human Rights Commission for flying the rainbow flag. The move was criticized by Senator Stephanie Chang, U.S. Representatives Shri Thanedar and Rashida Tlaib, and Detroit Mayor Mike Duggan.

In response to a decision by the city council, multiple activist groups organized into a coalition opposing the flag restrictions. The founding group consisted of individual activists, AntiTransphobe Detroit, Michigan General Defense Committee, and the Hamtramck Queer Alliance. Notable speakers at the event were Dana Nessel, Rev. Strickland, Grace of AtA, and Josh of HQA. Fired city officials, Russ Gordon and Cathy Stackpoole, challenged this move of the city council in court; their lawsuit was dismissed on September 2025 by the U.S. District Court for the Eastern District of Michigan, whose decision was later upheld on August 21, 2026 by the 6th Circuit Court of Appeals.

== Government ==
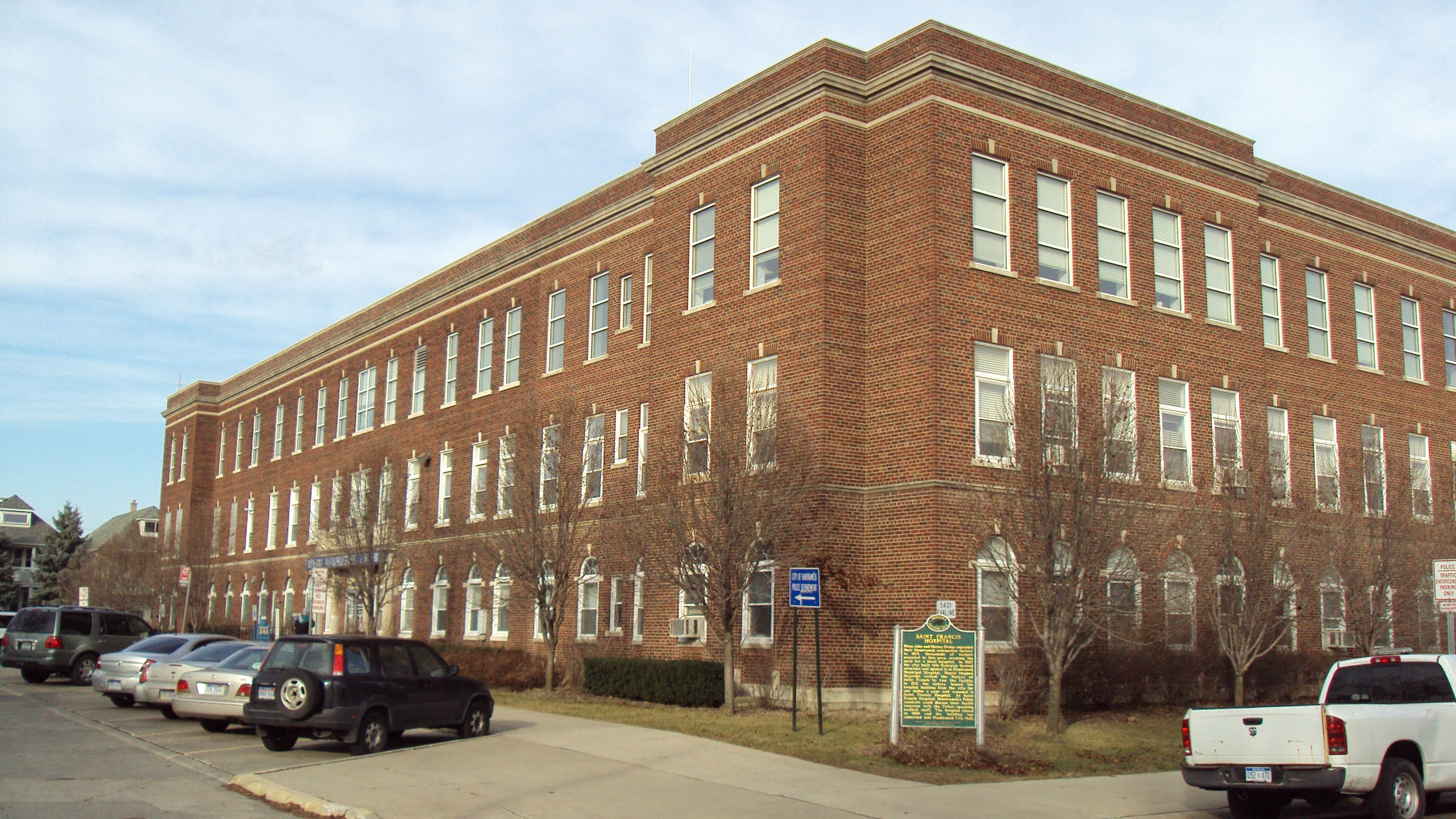
Hamtramck City Hall

Hamtramck is governed by a council-manager form of government in which the elected mayor of the city is the chief executive officer. The city council has six seats. Though part of the council, the mayor is elected separately and votes only in the case of a tie and on ordinances and contracts. The city council hires a city manager, who becomes the city's chief administrative officer. The city manager has the vested powers and responsibility to appoint and remove all city employees and department heads, prepare the city's budget, and other city functions.

Hamtramck City Hall is a former hospital building. In 1927, the Hamtramck Municipal Hospital, housed in a Georgian Revival building, opened. The mayor asked the Sisters of Saint Francis to operate the hospital. In 1931, the religious order began leasing the hospital from the city government for $1 per year. The hospital was renamed the Saint Francis Hospital. It offered services to Polish speakers. In 1969, the hospital closed and the building became city hall.

In 2015, Hamtramck became the first U.S. city to elect a Muslim-majority city council. In 2022, it became the first U.S. city to have an all-Muslim government. It also now has an all-male elected government, which has been said to "not reflect the city's makeup." The Wayne County Jail Division operates the William Dickerson Detention Facility in Hamtramck. The city levies a city income tax of 1% on residents and 0.5% on nonresidents.

== Education ==
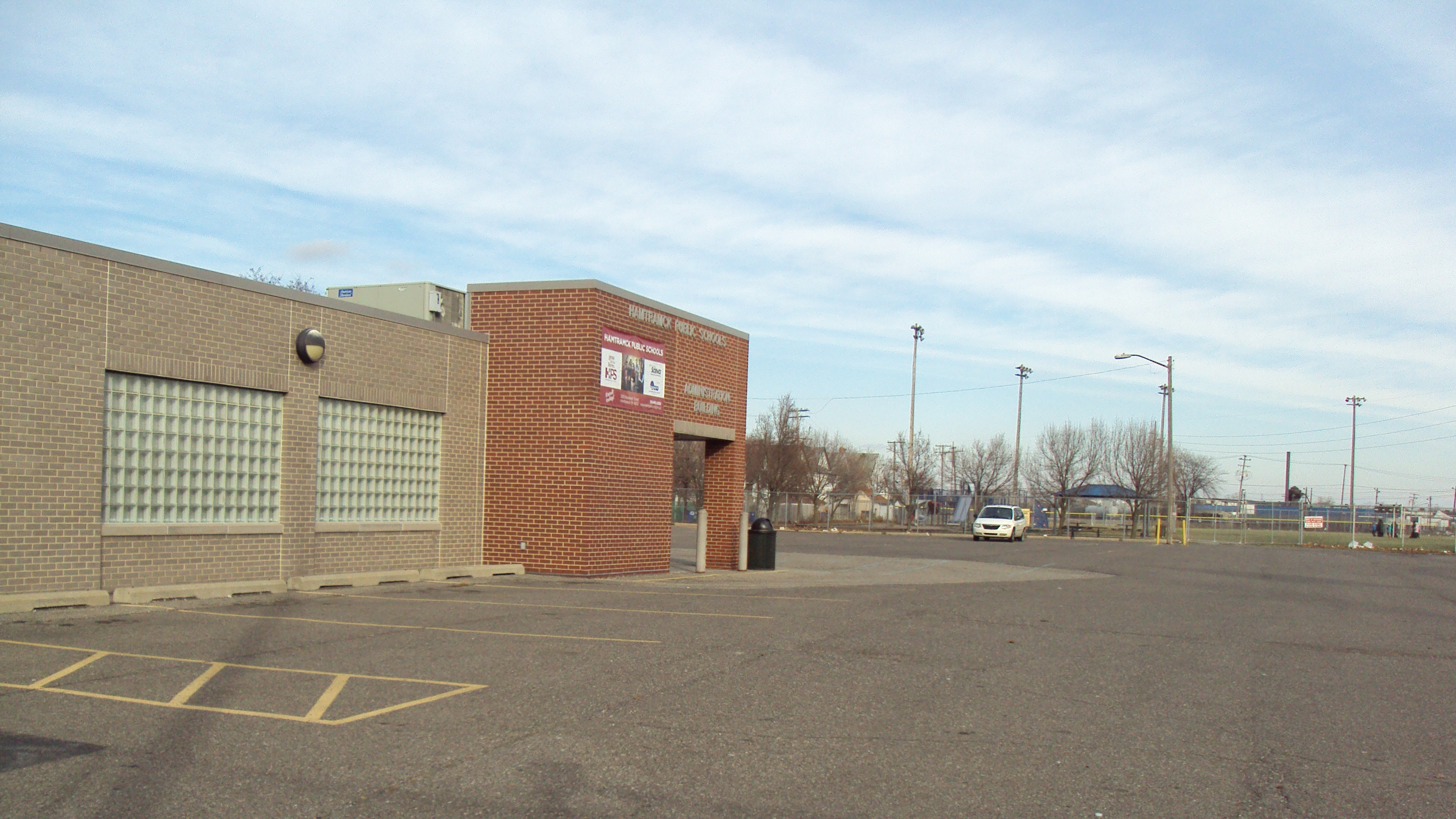
Hamtramck Public Schools headquarters

=== Public schools ===
Hamtramck is served by Hamtramck Public Schools. Hamtramck High School is the public high school of Hamtramck. In addition Hanley International Academy, Frontier International Academy, Hamtramck Academy, Bridge Academy (of the Global Educational Excellence (GEE) company), Caniff Liberty Academy and Oakland International Academy are all charter schools, in Hamtramck. Frontier International Academy, a charter school operated by GEE, is in nearby Detroit.

=== Private schools ===
Hamtramck formerly housed Catholic schools affiliated with the Roman Catholic Archdiocese of Detroit, including St. Florian Elementary School, Our Lady Queen of Apostles, and St. Ladislaus Elementary School. The city also housed St. Florian High School, a Catholic high school that opened in 1940 and was in a wing of the same building as St. Florian.

The parishes that established St. Florian, Our Lady Queen of Apostles, and St. Ladislaus were built after 1909. In 1925, 2,217 students attended St. Florian, making it the city's largest Catholic elementary school, while St. Ladislaus had 1,540 students and Our Lady Queen of Apostles had 1,316. JoEllen McNergney Vinyard, author of For Faith and Fortune: The Education of Catholic Immigrants in Detroit, 1805–1925, wrote that the classrooms were "more crowded than most any Polish parish school in Detroit." Many of Hamtramck's Catholic schools had 70 students per classroom, compared to 45 in Hamtramck public schools. It was common for children to attend religious schools during certain periods so they could absorb religious ideals and public school for preschool and later stages. In the 1920s, Hamtramck had no Catholic high school and most children attended public high school. Felician Academy and St. Josephat's Polish Catholic High School, two schools in Detroit, were several blocks away from the Hamtramck border. Some children attended those schools.

In 1992 Dickinson West Elementary School opened in the former St. Ladislaus building. In 2002, St. Florian High and Bishop Gallagher High School in Harper Woods merged to form Trinity Catholic High School in Harper Woods. In 2005, the archdiocese announced that St. Florian Elementary and Trinity High School would close. There are no longer any Catholic schools within Hamtramck's city limits.

=== History of education ===
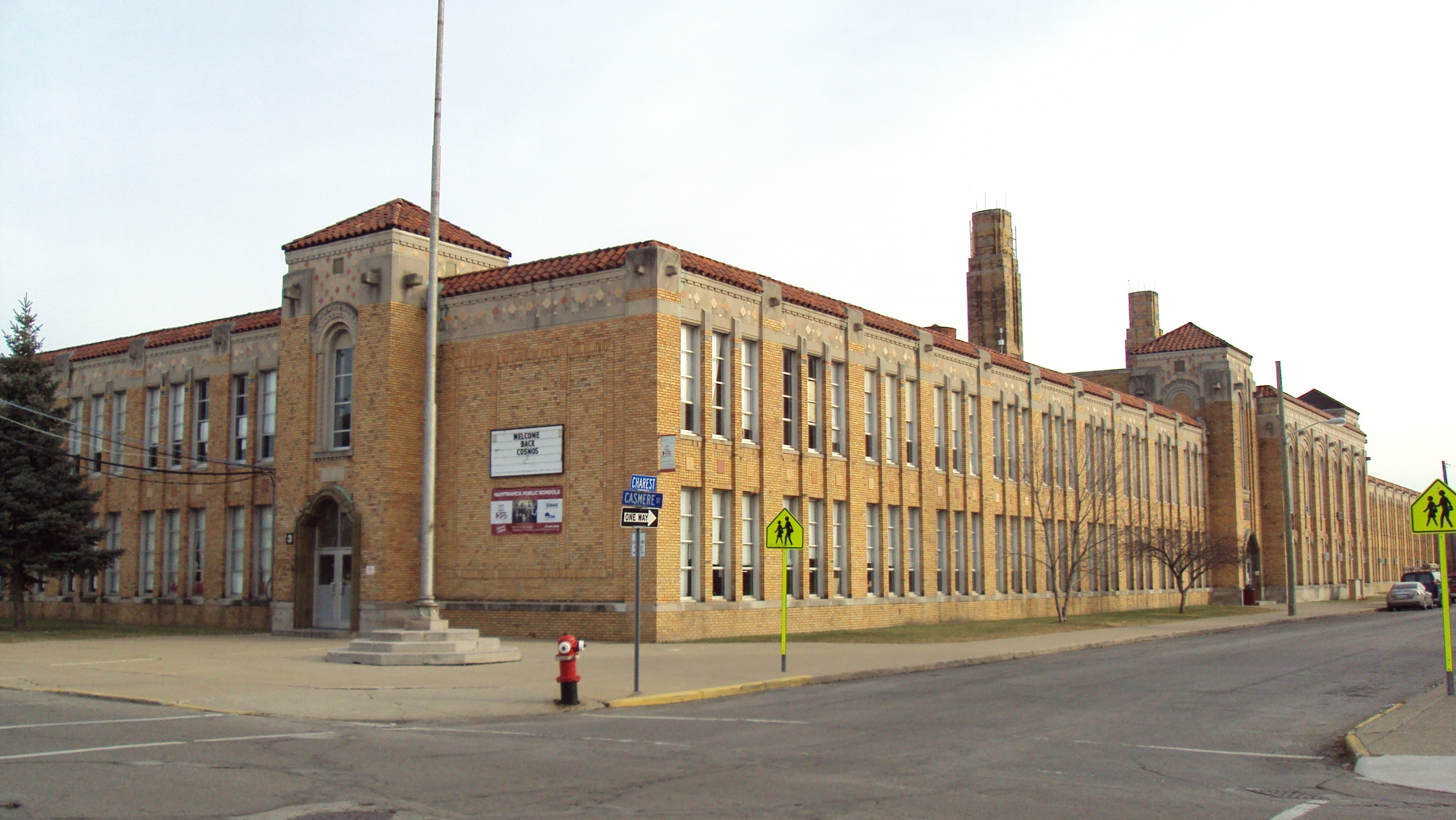
Hamtramck High School

In the 1920s, Hamtramck families often sent their children to public school for kindergarten due to convenience, then moved their children to parochial schools for the years with the most important religious instruction. Therefore, the age group 7 to 12 had the largest Catholic school enrollment. After the critical period ended, many students returned to public school. In 1925 the public schools had 1,467 students aged 14–15 while the non-public schools had 217 students aged 14 and 15. In the early 1920s the annual growth rate of Hamtramck Public Schools buildings were 27% while non-public schools had an annual growth rate of 6% in that period.

In the 1920s, there was a high level of school dropout in Hamtramck. During the decade Hamtramck had three 12th-grade students per 100 5th-grade students while the City of Detroit had 21 12th-grade students per 100 5th-grade students. In the 1920s, 58% of 16-year-olds and 85% of 17-year-olds in Hamtramck were no longer attending high school. One public school survey stated that in 1924–1925 65% of male school dropouts began working in factories.

=== Public libraries ===
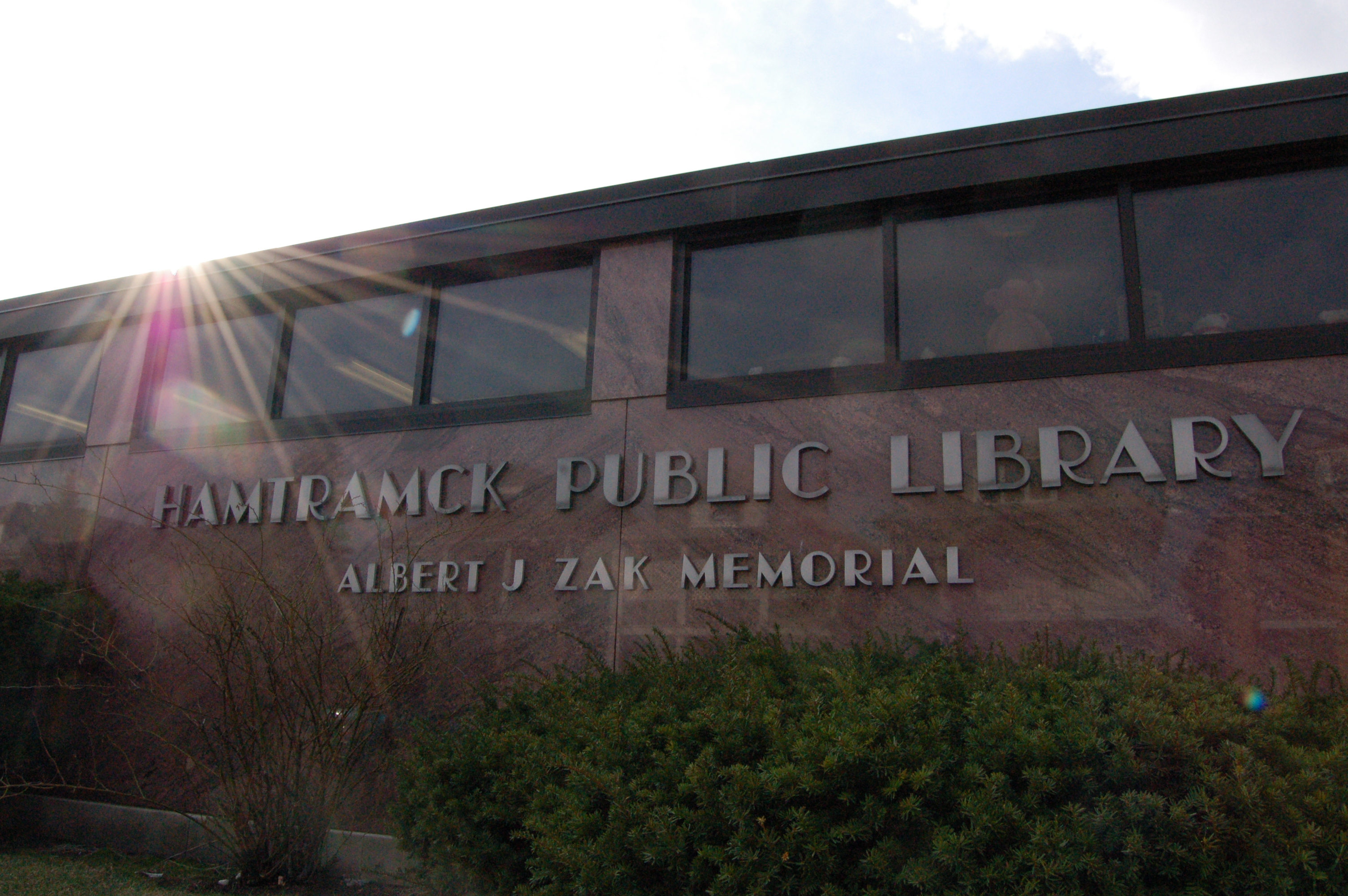
Hamtramck Public Library

Hamtramck Public Library Albert J. Zak Memorial is located at 2360 Caniff. The Tau Beta Association founded the library in November 1918. The library opened at its second location, the second floor of a professional building, on November 14, 1938. In 1951 the City Hall branch opened in the first floor of the municipal building; it was dedicated on January 22, 1952. The current library had its groundbreaking ceremony on July 5, 1955. It was completed on May 31, 1956, and dedicated on July 1, 1956.

== Timeline ==
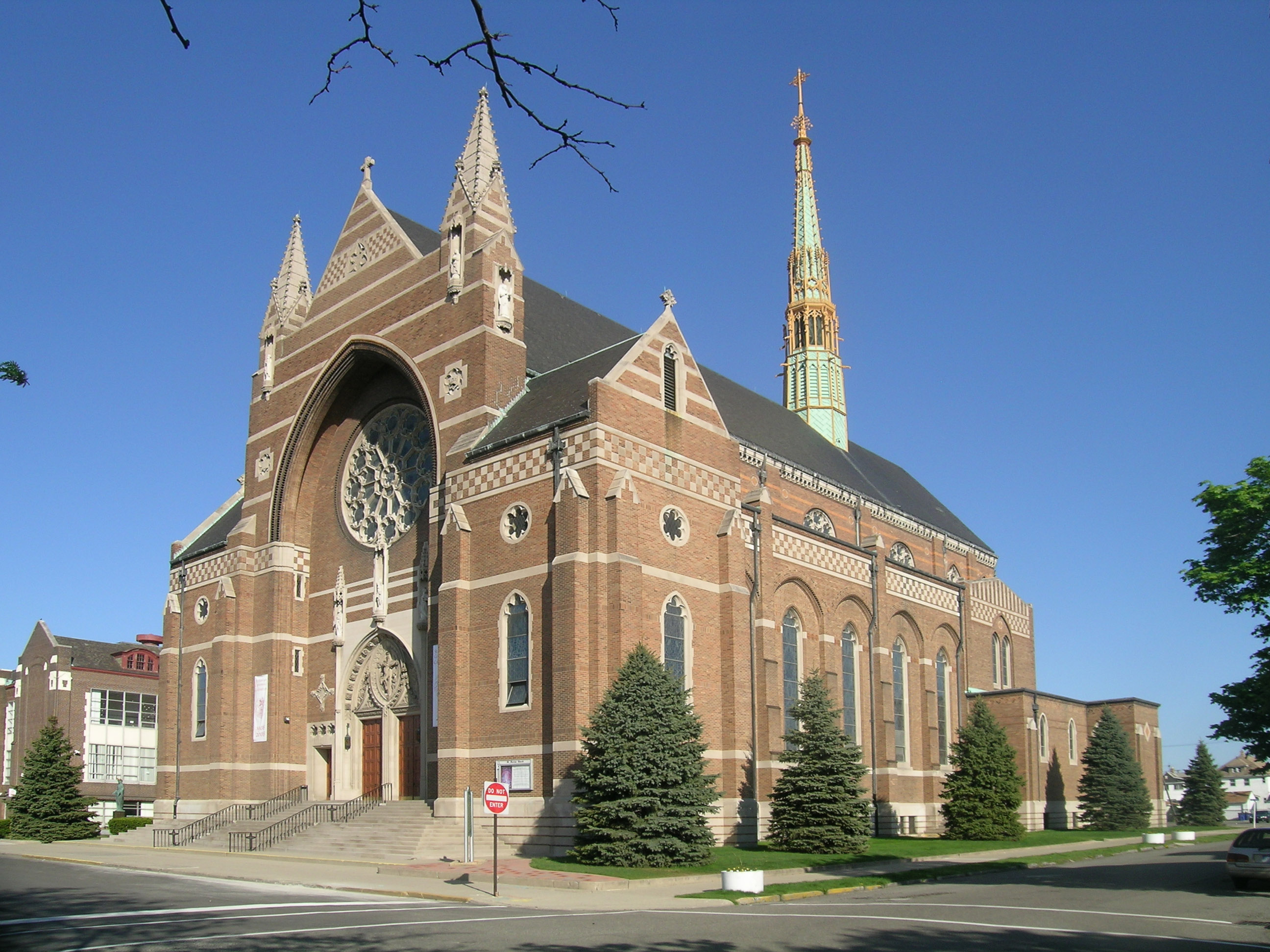
St. Florian Church

- 1796: Colonel Jean François Hamtramck took possession of Detroit after British troops evacuated.
- 1798: The Township of Hamtramck was established.
- 1901: Hamtramck was established as a village.
- 1908: Saint Florian Roman Catholic Church parish was the first Catholic church in Hamtramck.
- 1910: Dodge Brothers Motor Car Company broke ground for an automotive plant in Hamtramck; rapid influx of European immigrants began.
- 1914: Dodge Brothers plant began operations.
- 1922: Hamtramck was incorporated as a city to protect itself from annexation by Detroit; Peter C. Jezewski was the first mayor.
- 1926: St. Florian's present edifice was built. It had a 1928 Austin Organ Opus #1528 that contained three manuals and 40 ranks, which were newly refurbished in 2008.
- 1959: Won the Little League World Series of Baseball. Hamtramck was a hotbed of baseball activity at the time, and was the first Michigan team to win the title; the next time a team from Michigan won the title was Taylor in 2021.
- 1996: In November, voters passed the Ordinance to Preserve Parkland in Hamtramck by a 64% vote, after a year-long campaign, marking the first time an ordinance was ever enacted in the city by a referendum vote of the population.
- 2000: Hamtramck went into Emergency Financial Status after running million dollar deficits and political in-fighting. Gov. Engler appointed Louis Schimmel as emergency financial manager.
- 2005: Hamtramck voters ratified a new city charter.
- 2007: Hamtramck emerged from emergency financial management.
- 2010: Hamtramck asked the state of Michigan permission to file for bankruptcy protection.
- 2013: Hamtramck became the first Muslim-majority American city.
- 2014: Hamtramck reentered emergency management.
- 2015: Hamtramck became the first American city to elect a Muslim-majority city council.
- 2018: The city was released from emergency management for the second time.
- 2022: Hamtramck became the first American city with an all-Muslim government.
- 2023: Hamtramck City Council enacted pride flag restrictions and approved animal sacrifices for religious purposes.

== Notable people ==
- Jane Bartkowicz, tennis player and girls single winner at The Championships, Wimbledon; born in Hamtramck, and her skills were developed under the tutelage of the Hoxies
- Albert M. Bielawski, Michigan state representative, lived in Hamtramck
- Mike Blyzka, Major League Baseball pitcher, born in Hamtramck
- Danny Brown, rapper
- Paulette Childress, writer
- Lovell Coleman, born in Hamtramck, 1938; Western Michigan running back 1957–1959; Canadian Football League 1960–1970; CFL All-Star 1963–1965
- Toi Derricotte (born 1941), poet
- Matt Feazell, cartoonist
- Bob Franke, singer-songwriter, born in Hamtramck
- Amer Ghalib (born 1978), mayor of Hamtramck (2022–2026)
- Steve Gromek, Major League Baseball pitcher, born in Hamtramck
- John Hodiak (1914–1955), actor, raised in Hamtramck
- Jean Hoxie, Hamtramck tennis player and coach inducted into the Michigan Sports Hall of Fame in 1965
- Gail Kobe, actress, born and raised in Hamtramck.
- Robert Kozaren (1934–2007), mayor of Hamtramck 1980–1997
- Truth Martini, pro wrestling manager for Ring of Honor
- Warith Deen Mohammed (1933–2008), son of Elijah Muhammad, leader of American Society of Muslims, born in Hamtramck
- Bill Nahorodny, Major League Baseball catcher
- Lucien Nedzi, former US representative
- Tom Paciorek, Major League Baseball player, member of the 1961 Hamtramck team that won the Pony League World Series championship; is enshrined in the National Polish-American Sports Hall of Fame
- Wally Palmar (born Volodymyr Palamarchuk on April 27, 1954, in Hamtramck), singer for the Romantics
- Mitch Ryder, singer, the Detroit Wheels, born in Hamtramck
- Rudolph G. Tenerowicz (1890–1963), mayor of Hamtramck 1928–1932
- Kat Timpf, comedian, columnist, Fox News personality
- Rudy Tomjanovich, professional basketball player and coach of Croatian descent for the Houston Rockets, born in Hamtramck; member of the Michigan Sports Hall of Fame
- Tom Tyler (1903–1954), actor, retired to and died in Hamtramck
- Doug Wozniak, Michigan state representative
- Roger Zatkoff (1931–2021), NFL player for the Green Bay Packers and Detroit Lions
- Bob Zurke (1912–1944), pianist, composer, arranger and bandleader
- Raymond Zussman (1917–1944), recipient of the Medal of Honor

== See also ==
- Highland Park, another enclave of Detroit
- Islam in Metro Detroit
