= Hamtramck High School =

High school in Hamtramck, Wayne County, Michigan

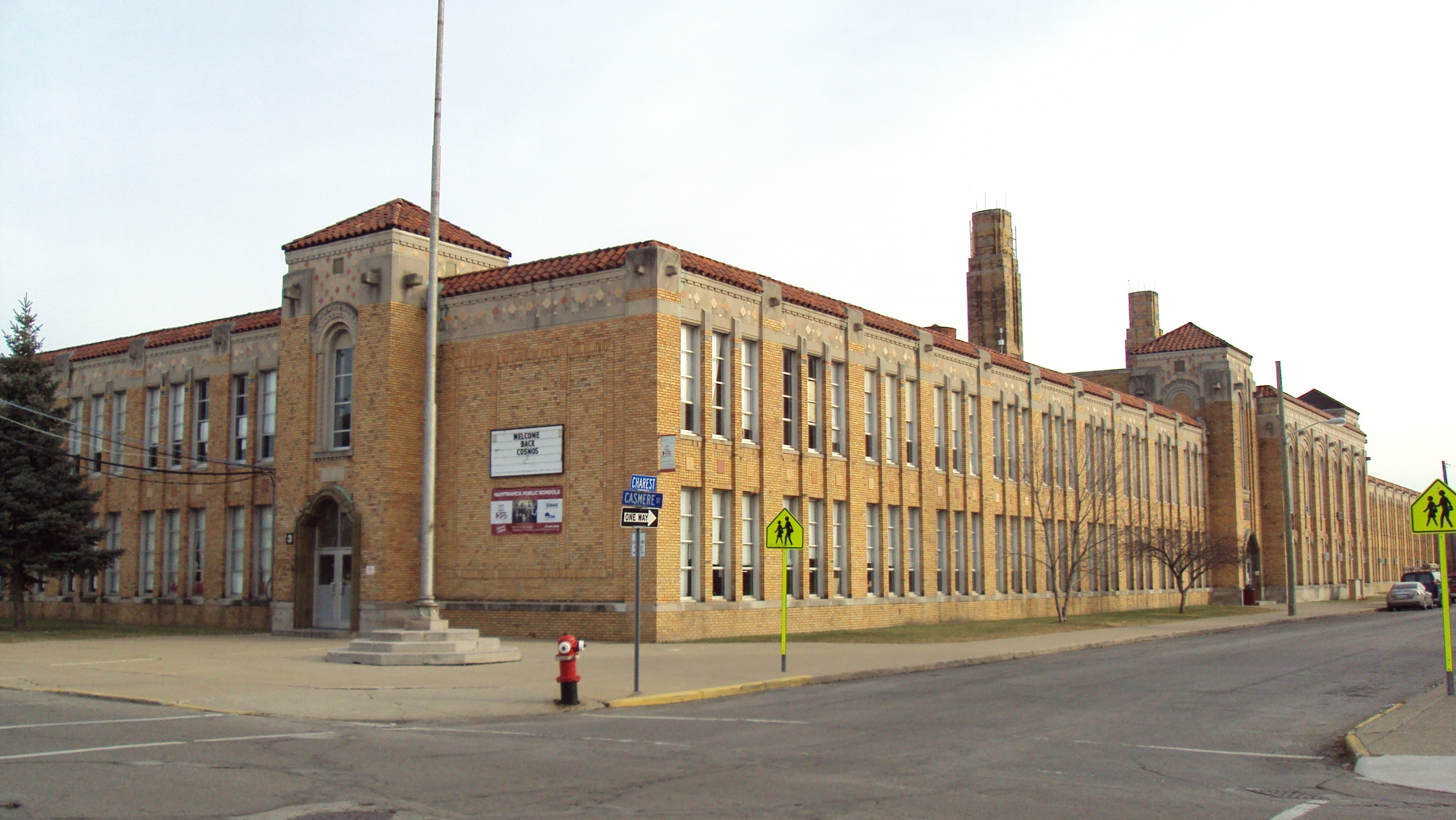

Location
- 11410 Charest Street; Hamtramck, Michigan 48212; United States; 42°24′09″N 83°03′29″W

Information
- Type: Public school
- Established: 1930
- School district: Hamtramck Public Schools
- Principal: Lawrence Stroughter
- Teaching staff: 48.75 (on an FTE basis)
- Grades: 9–12
- Enrollment: 965 (2023-2024)
- Student to teacher ratio: 19.79
- Colors: Maroon and white
- Athletics conference: Michigan Metro Athletic Conference
- Nickname: Cosmos
- Website: www.hamtramckschools.org/our-schools/hamtramck-high-school/

Student assessments
- 2021–22 school year Change vs. prior year

M-STEP 11th grade proficiency rates (Science / Social Studies)
- Advanced %: ≤5 / ≤5
- Proficient %: ≤5 / –
- PR. Proficient %: ≤5 / 49.4
- Not Proficient %: – / 32.6

Average test scores
- SAT Total: 836.8 (▼ −52)

Hamtramck High School is a public high school in Hamtramck, Michigan, United States in Metro Detroit. It is a part of Hamtramck Public Schools.

== History ==
Hamtramck High School was originally located on Wyandotte and Hewitt Streets.

In 1925 655 students attended Hamtramck High School. JoEllen McNergney Vinyard, author of For Faith and Fortune: The Education of Catholic Immigrants in Detroit, 1805-1925, wrote that Hamtramck High had "substantially more students than were in all of Detroit's Polish Catholic high schools combined."

In 1970 the school moved to the former Copernicus Middle School.

== Demographics ==
The demographic breakdown of the 999 students enrolled in 2016-17 was:

- Male - 82.0%
- Female - 34.0%
- Native American/Alaskan - >0.1%
- Asian - 3%
- Black - 20%
- Hispanic - 0.4%
- White - 2%
- Multiracial - 1.6%
- Arabs - 40%

97.9% of the students were eligible for free or reduced-cost lunch. For 2016-17, Hamtramck was a Title I school.

Note that Arab Americans are racially classified as "White".

== Notable alumni ==
- Abraham Aiyash, politician
- Ike Blessitt, former MLB player (Detroit Tigers)
- John Brisker, former NBA player declared legally dead after going missing in Uganda.
- Willie Fleming, former professional Canadian Football League player and member of the Canadian Football Hall of Fame, University of Iowa football player.
- Julius Franks, former American football player, first African-American All-American at Michigan
- Amer Ghalib, politician
- Mike Kostiuk, former American football player
- Art Macioszczyk, former American football player
- Cass Michaels, former MLB player (Chicago White Sox, Washington Senators, St. Louis Cardinals, Philadelphia Athletics)
- Bill Nahorodny. MLB former player Chicago White Sox, Seattle Mariners
- Rudy Tomjanovich, former player and coach for the Houston Rockets of the NBA
