= Bill Nahorodny =

American baseball player (born 1953)

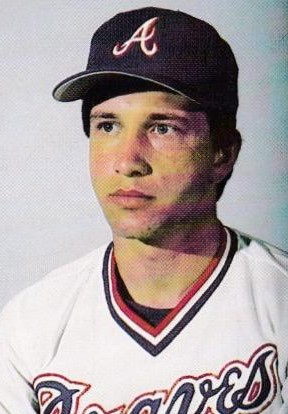
- Catcher
- Born: August 31, 1953 (age 72); Hamtramck, Michigan, U.S.
- Batted: Right Threw: Right

MLB debut
- September 27, 1976, for the Philadelphia Phillies

Last MLB appearance
- September 25, 1984, for the Seattle Mariners

MLB statistics
- Batting average: .241
- Home runs: 25
- Runs batted in: 109
- Stats at Baseball Reference

Teams
- Philadelphia Phillies (1976); Chicago White Sox (1977–1979); Atlanta Braves (1980–1981); Cleveland Indians (1982); Detroit Tigers (1983); Seattle Mariners (1984)

William Gerard Nahorodny (born August 31, 1953) is an American former professional baseball catcher. He played in Major League Baseball (MLB) from 1976-1984 for the Philadelphia Phillies, Chicago White Sox, Atlanta Braves, Cleveland Indians, Detroit Tigers, and Seattle Mariners.

Nahorodny attended Hamtramck High School in Hamtrack, Michigan. He then played baseball for St. Clair County Community College and was drafted by the Phillies in the 6th round (123rd overall) of the 1972 amateur draft. He made his major league debut on September 27, 1976, going 1-for-3 in a Phillies win over the St. Louis Cardinals. He was claimed off waivers by the Chicago White Sox on September 8, 1977, and played in a career high 107 games with Chicago in 1978.

Nahorodny was later a part-time player with the Atlanta Braves, Cleveland Indians, Detroit Tigers, and Seattle Mariners. He made his final major league appearance on September 25, 1984, collecting one RBI for Seattle in a loss to the Indians. He played AAA ball with the Portland Beavers before retiring after the 1985 season.

In 308 games over nine seasons, Nahorodny posted a .241 batting average (203-for-844) with 74 runs, 41 doubles, 3 triples, 25 home runs, 109 RBIs and 56 bases on balls. Defensively, he recorded a .983 fielding percentage.

He currently resides in Dunnellon, Florida.
