= Amer Ghalib =

American politician (born 1979)

Mayor of Hamtramck
- In office January 2, 2022 – January 4, 2026
- Preceded by: Karen Majewski
- Succeeded by: Adam Alharbi

Personal details
- Born: 1979 (age 46–47) Yemen
- Party: Democratic
- Children: 3
- Education: Hamtramck High School
- Alma mater: Henry Ford College; Wayne State University

Amer Ghalib (Arabic: عامر غالب, /ˈɑːmɛrɡɑːlɪb/ AHM-ir GAHL-ib; born 1979) is an American politician who served as the mayor of Hamtramck, Michigan from 2022 until 2026. A conservative Democrat, he was the first Arab American and the first Muslim to hold the office. Ghalib gained national attention as mayor for implementing an ordinance banning the pride flag from display on city property, divesting from investment in Israel, and for supporting Donald Trump in the 2024 United States presidential election.

In March 2025, Trump named Ghalib as his nominee for United States ambassador to Kuwait, but his nomination stalled after bipartisan criticism of past statements he made. Starting in 2026, Ghalib has served as the senior advisor for strategic partnerships at AmeriCorps.

== Early life and career ==
Ghalib was born in Yemen. He immigrated to the United States in 1997 and worked in a factory that made plastic components for cars while attending Hamtramck High School. He studied biology at Henry Ford Community College before attending Wayne State University where he received a biology degree. and became a healthcare worker at a medical office in Hamtramck. He has three children.

== Mayor of Hamtramck ==
In the 2021 Hamtramck mayoral election, Ghalib defeated incumbent mayor Karen Majewski with 68% of the vote. He became both the first Arab American and Muslim to hold the position and according to the Detroit Free Press became the first non-Polish American mayor in 100 years. A member of the Democratic Party, he worked with what was believed to be the first all-Muslim city council in the United States. In June 2023, the city council banned the pride flag from publicly owned flagpoles, with Ghalib stating that he "intended to bring neutrality to city property without promoting sexuality, racism, religion or politics". The move prompted criticism from several Michigan Democrats, including Rashida Tlaib. Ghalib described LGBTQ activists as a "militia".

Ghalib met with former U.S. National Security Advisor Michael Flynn on September 12, 2023. In June 2024, Ghalib and the city council unanimously passed a resolution which required the city to avoid investing in Israeli companies or those supporting Israeli apartheid.

=== 2024 presidential elections ===
During the 2024 Michigan Democratic presidential primary, Ghalib supported the Uncommitted Movement and recommended voters vote uncommitted instead of Joe Biden. In September 2024, Ghalib endorsed Donald Trump in the 2024 United States presidential election after meeting him at a town hall in Flint in which they discussed issues affecting Arab and Muslim Americans. Kurt Streeter of The New York Times reported that as a social conservative, Ghalib found more in common with Republicans who had "actively courted him." In his endorsement, Ghalib acknowledged their disagreements on key issues but that he believed that Trump would end the Gaza war. Trump reposted his endorsement on Truth Social and Ghalib joined him on some of his presidential campaign rallies.

After Trump began his presidency in 2025, Ghalib expressed continued support of Trump on Facebook despite Trump's expressed desire to permanently relocate Palestinians from Gaza.

== Nomination for United States Ambassador to Kuwait ==
In March 2025, Trump named Ghalib as his nominee for United States ambassador to Kuwait. Trump praised Ghalib on social media, writing, "Amer worked hard to help us secure a historic victory in Michigan".

During the hearings held by the U.S. Senate Committee on Foreign Relations for Ghalib's nomination to the ambassadorship to Kuwait, he received bipartisan criticism from senators such as Jeanne Shaheen (D-NH) and Ted Cruz (R-TX) for several statements and other actions he had allegedly made in the past, some of which were considered to be anti-Semitic in nature. Some of these included allegations of actions such as denying the sexual abuse committed against women during the October 7 massacre, liking a Facebook post comparing Jews to monkeys, declining to condemn a member of the Hamtramck City Council who called the Holocaust an "advanced punishment" for the war in Gaza, and supporting attacks against Israel by the Houthis. Ghalib was also accused of calling the Muslim Brotherhood an "inspiration" and labelling former Iraqi President Saddam Hussein a "martyr". The latter statement was particularly criticized due to Saddam Hussein's actions taken towards Kuwait, resulting in what would become the Persian Gulf War.

These comments caused Ghalib's nomination to stall and it is unclear if Trump will submit Ghalib's nomination again. When asked about his nomination, Ghalib said "I'm not interested in [the position] anymore."
