= Kostyantyn =

Kostyantyn or Kostiantyn is a given name. Notable people with the name include:

- Kostyantyn Balabanov (born 1982), Ukrainian football player
- Kostyantyn Bocharov (born 1997), Ukrainian singer and songwriter
- Kostyantyn Dankevych (1905–1984), Ukrainian composer and musical teacher
- Kostyantyn Doroshenko (born 1972), Ukraine Art critic, contemporary art curator, media manager, radio host of talk radio station Radio Vesti (Ukraine)
- Kostyantyn Dudchenko (born 1986), Ukrainian professional football player
- Kostyantyn Dymarchuk (born 1977), former Ukrainian football player
- Kostyantyn Gryshchenko (born 1953), Ukrainian diplomat and politician
- Kostyantyn Kravchenko (born 1986), Ukrainian footballer
- Kostyantyn Makhnovskyi (born 1989), Ukrainian professional football goalkeeper
- Kostyantyn Milyayev (born 1987), Ukrainian platform diver
- Kostyantyn Morozov, Minister of Defense of Ukraine, Extraordinary and Plenipotentiary Ambassador of Ukraine (2005)
- Kostyantyn Odolskyi (born 1989), professional Ukrainian football goalkeeper
- Kostyantyn Ostrozkyi (1460–1530), magnate of the Grand Duchy of Lithuania and later a Grand Hetman of Lithuania
- Kostyantyn Panin (born 1975), Ukrainian midfielder who has recently played for FC Zhetysu in Kazakhstan
- Kostyantyn Parkhomenko (born 1991), Ukrainian football player who last played for FC Sakhalin Yuzhno-Sakhalinsk
- Kostyantyn Pavliuchenko (born 1971), retired Kazakhstani professional footballer who also holds Ukrainian citizenship
- Kostyantyn Piliyev (born 1983), Ukrainian weightlifter
- Kostyantyn Rurak (born 1974), retired sprinter from Ukraine, who twice competed at the Summer Olympics: 1996 and 2000
- Kostyantyn Shchehodskyi (1911–1989), Soviet-Ukrainian football player and coach from Moscow
- Kostyantyn Simchuk (born 1974), former Ukrainian professional ice hockey goaltender
- Kostyantyn Symashko, Ukrainian Paralympic footballer who won a gold medal at the 2008 Summer Paralympics in China
- Kostyantyn Vasyukov (born 1981), retired Ukrainian athlete specialising in the sprinting events
- Kostyantyn Vizyonok (born 1976), former Ukrainian football player
- Kostyantyn Yaroshenko (born 1986), professional Ukrainian football defender for FC Ural Sverdlovsk Oblast in the Russian Premier
- Kostyantyn Zaytsev (born 1983), Ukrainian Olympic rower
- Kostyantyn Zhevago (born 1974), Ukrainian entrepreneur, the youngest self-made billionaire in Europe

== See also ==
- Konstantin
- Konstanty (disambiguation)
- Constantine (name)
