= St. Florian High School =

Catholic high school in Hamtramck, Michigan, United States

St. Florian High School was a Catholic high school in Hamtramck, Michigan of the Roman Catholic Archdiocese of Detroit. The school opened in 1940 and was located in the same building as St. Florian Elementary School.

== History ==
In the 1999-2000 school year 126 students were enrolled at the school. In the 2000-2001 school year this decreased to 110 students. In 2001 the school reduced teaching staff and programs, including American football, and it raised tuition from $3,500 to $4,500. In the 2001-2002 school year, 79 students were enrolled at the high school. In the fall of 2002, St. Florian and Bishop Gallagher High School in Harper Woods merged to form Trinity Catholic High School in Harper Woods. Pat Domagala, the principal of St. Florian, said that schools decided to merge because both were college preparatory schools and therefore had elements in common, and because Bishop Gallagher needed additional students and St. Florian needed additional programs. At that point St. Florian Elementary remained open. After St. Florian Elementary's closing in 2005, no Catholic schools are located within the city limits of Hamtramck. During the same year the archdiocese announced that Trinity would close.

== Notable alumni ==
Ron Kudla- 1988 Table Tennis Silver Medalist, Seoul Olympics
