= Kostyantyn Panin =

Ukrainian footballer

Personal information
- Date of birth: 8 December 1975 (age 50)
- Place of birth: Nikopol, Soviet Union
- Height: 1.76 m (5 ft 9 in)
- Position: Midfielder

Senior career*
Years	Team	Apps	(Gls)
1992–1993	Dnipro-2 Dnipropetrovsk		(0)
1993–1994	Kolos Chkalovske		
1994	Era Nikopol	4	(0)
1994	Dinamo Vologda	3	(0)
1995	Metallurg Cherepovets		
1996–1998	SC Odesa	35	(8)
1998–1999	Chornomorets Odesa	10	(0)
1999–2000	Amica Wronki	5	(1)
2001	Ukrajina-Sojuz Shevchenkove		
2002	KZEZO Kakhovka	18	(10)
2003	Kairat	16	(1)
2003–2005	Esil Bogatyr	68	(5)
2006–2008	Zhetysu	66	(16)
2009	Myr Hornostayivka	6	(2)
2009–2010	Tytan Armiansk	14	(7)
2010	Myr Hornostayivka	2	(0)
2011	Mažeikiai	2	(0)
2011	Krystal Kherson	21	(2)
2015	Viktoriya Hola Prystan Raion	2	(0)
- * Club domestic league appearances and goals

Kostyantyn Panin (Russian: Константин Панин; born 8 December 1975) is a Ukrainian former professional footballer who played as a midfielder.

== Honours ==
Amica Wronki

- Polish Super Cup: 1999
