= Kostyantyn Dymarchuk =

Ukrainian footballer

Personal information
- Full name: Kostyantyn Mykolayovych Dymarchuk
- Date of birth: 18 September 1977 (age 49)
- Place of birth: Donetsk, Soviet Union
- Height: 1.80 m (5 ft 11 in)
- Position: Defender

Youth career
- FC Shakhtar Donetsk

Senior career*
Years	Team	Apps	(Gls)
1993–1994	FC Harant Donetsk		
1994–1995	SC Odesa	22	(1)
1995	FC Portovyk Illichivsk	15	(2)
1996–1997	SC Odesa	33	(1)
1997–1998	FC Zenit Saint Petersburg	9	(0)
1997–1998	→ FC Zenit-d Saint Petersburg	9	(0)
1998	FC Tyumen	12	(0)
1999	FC Zhemchuzhina Sochi	3	(0)
1999	→ FC Zhemchuzhina-2 Sochi (loan)	10	(0)
2000	FC Kristall Smolensk	12	(0)
2002	FC Terek Grozny	33	(0)
2003	FC Mashuk-KMV Pyatigorsk	1	(0)
2004	FC Spartak Kostroma	2	(0)
2007	FC Sever Murmansk (amateur)		
- * Club domestic league appearances and goals

Kostyantyn Mykolayovych Dymarchuk (Ukrainian: Костянтин Миколайович Димарчук; born 18 September 1977 in Donetsk, Soviet Union) is a Ukrainian former football player.
