= For Faith and Fortune =

1998 book by JoEllen McNergney Vinyard

- Author: JoEllen McNergney Vinyard
- Genre: Sociology
- Publisher: University of Illinois Press
- Publication date: 1998
- ISBN: 978-0252024054

For Faith and Fortune: The Education of Catholic Immigrants in Detroit, 1805–1925 is a 1998 book by JoEllen McNergney Vinyard and published by the University of Illinois Press. It discussed Catholics in Detroit from the Michigan territorial era through the 1920s and how these Catholics educated their children.

Vinyard is an Eastern Michigan University history professor.

== Contents ==
The book spanned the years 1805 through 1925. Initially Protestants and Catholics both supported the establishment of public schools, but a rise in nativism, activism to use the King James Bible, preferred by Protestants, caused the cooperation to collapse. By the 1880s immigrant Catholics established their own school system in response to these social changes. The Catholics believed that education according to their faith was crucial and that the family had the responsibility of their children's education rather than the government. The author discussed the differences in Catholic schools in different parishes. The book discussed how there was overall less anti-Catholic sentiment and more inter-denominational cooperation in Detroit compared to other American cities. The later parts of the book document a failed Ku Klux Klan attempt to abolish Catholic schools by state constitutional amendment.

Earl Boyea of the Sacred Heart Major Seminary referred to Chapters 3–7 as "the heart of the book" and the "most fascinating" portion. Michael F. Perko of the Loyola University of Chicago wrote that the book is "strongest" in discussion the religious sister staff of the schools, and that the book also has ample exposition discussing the immigrant communities making up Detroit's Catholic community. The ethnic groups discussed include Belgians, Germans, Hungarians, Irish, Italians, and Poles.

== Reception ==
Perko wrote that the book "represents an important addition to the burgeoning literature of Catholic parochial education on the urban frontier." Perko praised the book's account of how Catholic education developed within the wider educational environment of Detroit, and the dismissal of labels such as "Americanist", "conservative", and "liberal"; as well as the portions discussing the Felicians and the Servants of the Immaculate Heart of Mary. Perko argued that the book sometimes had inaccuracies regarding its discussions about "the wider structures of schooling" including the author "[underestimating] the force of religion[...]in driving parochial school formation" and the author's argument that the city's educational structures formed out of random chance, but he characterizes these issues as "minor".

SaraLee R. Howard, a historian at the Michigan Historical Museum in Lansing, described For Faith and Fortune as "a successful and intriguing book on parochial education". Howard wrote that the book should have incorporated more direct quotations from the primary sources.

C. Patricia Sullivan, a New York City resident who reviewed the book for International Migration Review, stated that the book was "a useful addition to the literature of ethnicity and population".

Timothy Walsh of the Hoover Presidential Library described the book as "an excellent addition to the historical literature on urbanization, religion, and education".

Boyea wrote that the book is a "detailed and attractive picture of a community's struggle to educate its youth".
