= List of public school academy districts in Michigan =

This is a complete listing of Public School Academy (PSA), or charter school districts in the state of Michigan.

- For intermediate school districts (ISDs), see list of intermediate school districts in Michigan.
- For local education agency (LEA) districts, which include public schools, see list of local education agency districts in Michigan.

District name	Dist. ID	ISD	County	Authorizing agency	Date opened	Grades Served	Services
Academic and Career Education Academy	56903	Midland County ESA	Midland	Midland County ESA	05 Sep 2006	9-12	GenEd,Alt,SpecEd,PCE,SuppVirt
Academy for Business and Technology	82921	Wayne County RESA	Wayne	Eastern Michigan University	8 Sep 2003	KG, 1-12	GenEd,PK,SpecEd,SuppVirt
Academy of Warren	50911	Macomb ISD	Macomb	Bay Mills Community College	24 Aug 2005	KG, 1–8	GenEd,SpecEd
Achieve Charter Academy	82717	Wayne County RESA	Wayne	Grand Valley State University	09 Sep 2009	KG, 1-8	GenEd,SpecEd
Achieve - Detroit	82768	Wayne County RESA	Wayne	Detroit Public Schools Community District	01 Apr 2025	9-12	Alt,SpecEd,PCE,FaceVirt
Advanced Technology Academy	63914	Wayne County RESA	Wayne	Lake Superior State University	02 Sep 2008	1-12	GenEd,Alt,SpecEd,SuppVirt
AGBU Alex-Marie Manoogian School	63901	Oakland ISD	Oakland	Central Michigan University	28 Aug 1995	KG, 1-12	GenEd,SpecEd
Alternative Educational Academy of Iosco County	35902	Iosco RESA	Iosco	Iosco RESA	1 Sep 2012	6-12	GenEd,Alt,SpecEd,PCE
Alternative Educational Academy of Ogemaw County	35902	C.O.O.R. ISD	Ogemaw	C.O.O.R. ISD	1 Sep 2014	6-12	GenEd,Alt,SpecEd,PCE
American International Academy	82730	Wayne County RESA	Wayne	Lake Superior State University	3 Sep 2011	KG, 1-3	GenEd,SpecEd,SuppVirt
American Montessori Academy	82981	Wayne County RESA	Wayne	Bay Mills Community College	13 Sep 2004	KG, 1-8	GenEd,PK,SpecEd,SchlChoice,SuppVirt
Arbor Academy	13901	Calhoun ISD	Calhoun	Grand Valley State University	01 Aug 1998	KG, 1-8	GenEd, SpecEd
Arbor Preparatory High School	82981	Washtenaw ISD	Washtenaw	Bay Mills Community College	6 Sep 2011	9-12	GenEd,SpecEd,SuppVirt
Arts Academy in the Woods	50905	Macomb ISD	Macomb	Macomb ISD	27 Aug 2001	6-12	GenEd,SpecEd
Arts and Technology Academy of Pontiac	63915	Oakland ISD	Oakland	Bay Mills Community College	01 Sep 2001	KG, 1-12	GenEd,PK,Alt,SpecEd,SuppVirt
Aztec Eagles Academy	82918	Wayne RESA	Wayne	Grand Valley State University	3 Sep 1996	KG, 1-12	GenEd, SpecEd
Battle Creek Area Learning Center	13904	Calhoun ISD	Calhoun	Bay Mills Community College	26 Aug 2002	9-12	Alt,SpecEd,PCE,SuppVirt
Battle Creek Montessori Academy	13904	Calhoun ISD	Calhoun	Ferris State University	1 Jul 2013	KG, 1-8	GenEd,PK,SpecEd,SuppVirt
Bay City Academy	09903	Bay-Arenac ISD	Bay/Antrim	Lake Superior State University	01 Jul 2013	KG, 1-12	GenEd,PK,SpecEd,SuppVirt
Bay-Arenac Community High School	09901	Bay-Arenac ISD	Bay	Bay-Arenac ISD	28 Aug 1995	9-12	GenEd,Alt,SpecEd,PCE
Benton Harbor Charter School	11903	Berrien RESA	Berrien	Ferris State University	21 Aug 2000	KG, 1-8	GenEd,PK,SpecEd,SuppVirt
Black River Public School	70904	Ottawa ISD	Ottawa	Grand Valley State University	26 Aug 1996	KG, 1-12	GenEd,SpecEd
Blended Learning Academies Credit Recovery High School	33914	Ingham ISD	Ingham/Wayne	Ferris State University	1 Jul 2014	9-12	GenEd,PK,SpecEd,SuppVirt
Blue Water Middle College	74914	St. Clair County RESA	St. Clair	St. Clair ISD	06 Sep 2011	9-12	GenEd, SpecEd
Bradford Academy	63917	Oakland ISD	Oakland	Bay Mills Community College	28 Aug 2003	KG, 1-12	GenEd,PK,SpecEd,SuppVirt
Branch Line School	82705	Wayne County RESA	Wayne	Saginaw Valley State University	1 Jul 2013	KG, 1-8	GenEd,PK,SpecEd
Bridge Academy	82983	Wayne County RESA	Wayne	Ferris State University	23 Aug 2004	KG, 1-12	GenEd,PK,SpecEd
Bridge Academy of Southwest Michigan	11900	Berrien RESA	Berrien	Central Michigan University	1 Jul 2021	9-12	GenEd,SpecEd,PCE
Burton Glen Charter Academy	25909	Genesee ISD	Genesee	Northern Michigan University	01 Sep 1999	KG, 1-8	GenEd,SpecEd
Byron Center Charter School	41908	Kent ISD	Kent	Grand Valley State University	26 Aug 1996	KG, 1-12	GenEd,SpecEd,SuppVirt
Caniff Liberty Academy	82745	Wayne County RESA	Wayne	Oakland University	01 Jul 2012	KG, 1-8	GenEd,PK,SpecEd,SuppVirt
Canton Charter Academy	82968	Wayne County RESA	Wayne	Central Michigan University	01 Sep 2000	KG, 1-8	GenEd,SpecEd
Canton Preparatory High School	82711	Wayne County RESA	Wayne	Grand Valley State University	01 Jul 2014	7-12	GenEd,SpecEd,SuppVirt
Casman Alternative Academy	51903	Manistee ISD	Manistee	Manistee ISD	02 Sep 1997	7-12	GenEd,Alt,SpecEd,SuppVirt
Center Line Preparatory Academy Academy	50918	Macomb ISD	Macomb	Central Michigan University	1 Jul 2020	KG, 1-12	GenEd,SpecEd
Central Academy	81902	Washtenaw ISD	Washtenaw	Central Michigan University	26 Aug 1996	KG, 1-12	GenEd,PK,SpecEd,SuppVirt
Chandler Park Academy	82923	Wayne County RESA	Wayne	Saginaw Valley State University	02 Jun 1997	KG, 1-12	GenEd,PK,SpecEd,SuppVirt
Chandler Woods Charter Academy	41920	Kent County ISD	Kent	Grand Valley State University	01 Sep 1999	KG, 1-8	GenEd,PK,SpecEd
Charlton Heston Academy	72901	C.O.O.R. ISD	Roscommon	Lake Superior State University	1 Jul 2012	KG, 1-12	GenEd,PK,SpecEd
Charyl Stockwell Academy	47902	Livingston ESA	Livingston	Central Michigan University	19 Aug 1996	KG, 1-12	GenEd,PK,SpecEd
Chatfield School	44901	Lapeer ISD	Lapeer	Saginaw Valley State University	02 Jun 1997	KG, 1-8	GenEd,SpecEd
Cole Academy	33901	Ingham ISD	Ingham	Central Michigan University	28 Aug 1995	KG, 1–5	GenEd,SpecEd
Commonwealth Community Development Academy	82919	Wayne County RESA	Wayne	Eastern Michigan University	04 Sep 1996	KG, 1–8	GenEd,PK,SpecEd
Concord Academy - Boyne	15901	Charlevoix-Emmet ISD	Charlevoix	Lake Superior State University	02 Oct 1995	KG, 1-12	Alt,GenEd,SpecEd
Concord Academy - Petoskey	24901	Charlevoix-Emmet ISD	Emmet	Lake Superior State University	31 Mar 1995	KG, 1-12	GenEd,PK,Alt,SpecEd
Copper Island Academy	31900	Copper Country ISD	Houghton	Central Michigan University	01 Jul 2021	KG, 1-11	GenEd,SpecEd
Cornerstone Jefferson-Douglass Academy	82760	Wayne County RESA	Wayne	Grand Valley State University	7 Jul 2017	KG, 1-8	GenEd,SpecEd
Countryside Academy	11901	Berrien RESA	Berrien	Central Michigan University	30 May 1997	KG, 1-5	GenEd,SpecEd,SuppVirt
Covenant High School Grand Rapids	41900	Kent ISD	Kent	Grand Valley State University	1 Jul 2013	9-12	GenEd,Alt,SpecEd,PCE,SuppVirt
Covenant Schools Detroit	82991	Wayne County RESA	Wayne	Grand Valley State University	26 Sep 2005	9-12	GenEd,Alt,SpecEd,PCE,SuppVirt
Creative Montessori Academy	82969	Wayne County RESA	Wayne	Central Michigan University	29 Jan 2001	KG, 1-8	GenEd,PK,SpecEd,SuppVirt
Creative Technologies Academy	41918	Kent County ISD	Kent	Ferris State University	19 Aug 1998	KG, 1-12	GenEd,PK,Alt,SpecEd
Crescent Academy	63921	Oakland ISD	Oakland	Bay Mills Community College	30 Aug 2004	KG, 1-12	GenEd,PK,SpecEd,SuppVirt
Cross Creek Charter Academy	41916	Kent County ISD	Kent	Central Michigan University	02 Sep 1997	KG, 1-8	GenEd,SpecEd
Crossroads Charter Academy	54901	Mecosta-Osceola ISD	Mecosta	Grand Valley State University	01 Feb 2003	KG, 1-12	GenEd,Alt,SpecEd,SuppVirt
Da Vinci Schools	38901	Jackson ISD	Jackson	Central Michigan University	28 Aug 1995	KG, 1-12	GenEd,PCE,FaceVirt
David Ellis Academy	82947	Wayne County RESA	Wayne	Detroit Public Schools Community District	03 Nov 1998	KG, 1-8	GenEd,PK,SpecEd,SuppVirt
David Ellis Academy West	82994	Wayne County RESA	Wayne	Bay Mills Community College	05 Sep 2006	KG, 1-8	GenEd,PK,SpecEd,SuppVirt
The Dearborn Academy	82928	Wayne County RESA	Wayne	Central Michigan University	03 Sep 1997	KG, 1-8	GenEd,PK,SpecEd
DeTour Arts and Technology Academy	17903	Eastern Upper Peninsula ISD	Chippewa	Lake Superior State University	07 Sep 2010	KG, 1-12	GenEd,PK,Alt,SpecEd,PCE
Detroit Academy of Arts and Sciences	82929	Wayne County RESA	Wayne	Oakland University	02 Sep 1997	KG, 1-12	GenEd,Alt,PK,SpecEd
Detroit Achievement Academy	82700	Wayne County RESA	Wayne	Grand Valley State University	24 Aug 2004	KG, 1-8	GenEd,SpecEd
Detroit Community Schools	82925	Wayne County RESA	Wayne	Saginaw Valley State University	02 Jun 1997	KG, 1-8	GenEd,PK,Alt,SpecEd,SuppVirt
Detroit Edison Public School Academy	82945	Wayne County RESA	Wayne	Oakland University	18 Sep 1998	KG, 1-8	GenEd,PK,SchlChoice,SpecEd
Detroit Enterprise Academy	82979	Wayne County RESA	Wayne	Grand Valley State University	24 Aug 2004	KG,1-8	GenEd,SpecEd
Detroit Innovation Academy	82379	Wayne County RESA	Wayne	Central Michigan University	1 Jul 2012	KG, 1-8	GenEd,SpecEd
Detroit Leadership Academy	82722	Wayne County RESA	Wayne	Central Michigan University	1 Jul 2012	KG, 1-12	GenEd,PK,SpecEd,SuppVirt
Detroit Merit Charter Academy	82974	Wayne County RESA	Wayne	Grand Valley State University	10 Oct 2002	KG, 1-8	GenEd,SpecEd
Detroit Premier Academy	82985	Wayne County RESA	Wayne	Grand Valley State University	31 Aug 2005	KG,1-8	GenEd,SpecEd
Detroit Service Learning Academy	82953	Wayne County RESA	Wayne	Lake Superior State University	01 Sep 1999	KG,1-8	GenEd,SpecEd
Discovery Creative Pathways	82763	Wayne County RESA	Wayne	Central Michigan University	01 Jul 2017	KG,1-8	GenEd,SpecEd,SuppVirt
Dove Academy of Detroit	82930	Wayne County RESA	Wayne	Oakland University	25 Aug 1997	KG, 1–8	GenEd,PK,SpecEd,SuppVirt
Dr. Joseph F. Pollack Academic Center of Excellence	63910	Oakland Schools	Oakland	Eastern Michigan University	01 Sep 1999	K-8	GenEd,PK,Alt,SpecEd
Eagle Crest Charter Academy	70906	Ottawa ISD	Ottawa	Central Michigan University	02 Sep 1997	KG,1-8	GenEd,SpecEd
East Arbor Charter Academy	81910	Washtenaw ISD	Washtenaw	Grand Valley State University	06 Sep 2011	KG,1-8	GenEd,SpecEd
East Shore Charter Academy	81910	St. Clair County RESA	St. Clair	Northern Michigan University	01 Jul 2014	KG,1-8	GenEd,SpecEd
Eaton Academy	82915	Macomb ISD	Macomb	Central Michigan University	05 Sep 1996	KG, 1-8	GenEd,SpecEd
Endeavor Charter Academy	13902	Calhoun ISD	Calhoun	Grand Valley State University	01 Sep 1998	KG,1-8	GenEd,SpecEd
Escuela Avancemos	82744	Wayne County RESA	Wayne	Central Michigan University	01 Jul 2012	KG,1-8	GenEd,SpecEd
Excel Charter Academy	41905	Kent County ISD	Kent	Grand Valley State University	06 Sep 1995	KG,1-8	GenEd,SpecEd
Faxon Academy	63926	Oakland Schools	Oakland	Saginaw Valley State University	01 Sep 1999	KG, 1-8	GenEd,SpecEd
Flagship Charter Academy	82997	Wayne County RESA	Wayne	Central Michigan University	04 Sep 2007	KG,1-8	GenEd,SpecEd
Flat River Academy	41911	Montcalm Area ISD	Montcalm	Saginaw Valley State University	01 Sep 2003	KG,1-8	GenEd,PK,SpecEd
Flex High School of Michigan	41911	Genesee ISD	Genesee	Central Michigan University	01 Sep 2003	9-12	GenEd,Alt,SpecEd,PCE,SuppVirt
FlexTech High School	47903	Livingston ESA	Livingston	Central Michigan University	06 Sep 2011	9-12	GenEd,Alt,SpecEd,SuppVirt
FlexTech High School Shepherd	37900	Gratiot-Isabella RESD	Isabella	Bay Mills Community College	01 Jul 2018	8-12	GenEd,Alt,SpecEd,SuppVirt
Flint Cultural Center Academy	25919	Genesee ISD	Genesee	Grand Valley State University	01 Jul 2019	KG, 1-8	GenEd,SpecEd
Fortis Academy	81906	Washtenaw ISD	Washtenaw	Bay Mills Community College	25 Aug 2004	KG,1-8	GenEd,SpecEd
Fostering Leadership Academy	82772	Wayne County RESA	Wayne	Grand Valley State University	01 Jul 2020	KG, 1-8	GenEd,SpecEd
Founders Grove Classical Academy	56900	Midland County ISD	Midland	Central Michigan University	01 Jul 2026	KG, 1-6	GenEd,SpecEd
Four Corners Montessori Academy	63923	Oakland Schools	Oakland	Oakland University	08 Sep 2009	KG, 1-8	GenEd,PK,SpecEd,SuppVirt
Francis Reh PSA	73909	Saginaw ISD	Saginaw	Northern Michigan University	18 Sep 1998	KG,1-8	GenEd,PK,SpecEd,SuppVirt
Frontier International Academy	82987	Wayne County RESA	Wayne/Macomb	Bay Mills Community College	22 Aug 2005	KG, 1-12	GenEd,SpecEd,SuppVirt
Gaming and Technology Academy of Saginaw	73914	Saginaw ISD	Saginaw	Lake Superior State University	01 Jul 2026	KG,1-8	GenEd,PK,SpecEd
Gateway To Success Academy	53901	West Shore ESD	Mason	West Shore ESD	01 Jul 2016	6-12	GenEd,Alt,SpecEd,PCE,FaceVirt,SuppVirt
Gaudior Academy	82911	Wayne County RESA	Wayne	Eastern Michigan University	04 Sep 1996	KG,1-8	GenEd,PK,SpecEd
GEE Compass Academy	81916	Washtenaw ISD	Washtenaw	Grand Valley State University	01 Jul 2023	KG,1-12	GenEd,SpecEd,FaceVirt
George Crockett Academy	82937	Wayne County RESA	Wayne	Northern Michigan University	19 Aug 1998	KG,1-8	GenEd,PK,Alt,SpecEd,SuppVirt
George Washington Carver Academy	82963	Wayne County RESA	Wayne	Bay Mills Community College	27 Sep 1999	KG,1-8	Alt,GenEd,PK,SpecEd
Gerald Dawkins Academy	41932	Kent ISD	Kent	Grand Valley State University	1 Jul 2023	KG,1-5	GenEd
Global Heights Academy	82725	Wayne County RESA	Wayne	Grand Valley State University	07 Sep 2010	KG,1-8	GenEd,PK,SpecEd
Global Tech Academy	81900	Washtenaw ISD	Washtenaw	Eastern Michigan University	01 Jul 2014	KG,1-6	GenEd,PK,SpecEd
Grand Blanc Academy	25903	Genesee ISD	Genesee	Eastern Michigan University	01 Sep 1999	KG,1-8	GenEd,PK,SpecEd,SuppVirt
Grand Rapids Child Discovery Center	41921	Kent County ISD	Kent	Grand Rapids	22 Aug 2000	KG,1-5	GenEd,SpecEd
Grand River Academy	82757	Oakland Schools	Wayne	Grand Valley State University	01 Jul 2014	KG,1-8	GenEd,SpecEd
Grand River Preparatory High School	41930	Kent County ISD	Kent	Grand Valley State University	02 Sep 2008	9-12	GenEd,SpecEd,SuppVirt
Grand Traverse Academy	28902	Traverse Bay Area ISD	Grand Traverse	Lake Superior State University	01 Oct 2000	KG-Part,1-12	GenEd,PK,SpecEd
Great Lakes Academy	63907	Oakland ISD	Oakland	Eastern Michigan University	17 Jun 1997	KG, 1-8	GenEd,SpecEd
Great Lakes Learning Academy	33914	Ingham ISD	Ingham	Central Michigan University	17 Jun 1997	6-12	GenEd,Alt,SpecEd,FTVirtual,PCE
Great Oaks Academy	63922	Macomb ISD	Macomb	Bay Mills Community College	30 Aug 2004	KG,1-8	GenEd,SpecEd
Greater Heights Academy	25914	Genesee ISD	Genesee	Grand Valley State University	01 Jul 2013	KG,1-6	GenEd,SpecEd
The Greenspire School	28904	Northwest Education Services	Grand Traverse	Grand Valley State University	06 Sep 2011	6-12	GenEd,Alt,SpecEd
Grove Montessori: A Wildflower Public School	41933	Kent County ISD	Kent	Grand Valley State University	01 Jul 2025	1-5	GenEd,SpecEd
Hamtramck Academy	82977	Wayne County RESA	Wayne	Bay Mills Community College	08 Sep 2003	KG,1-8	GenEd,SpecEd
Hanley International Academy	82986	Wayne County RESA	Wayne	Grand Valley State University	06 Sep 2005	KG, 1-8	GenEd,PK,SpecEd,SuppVirt
Henry Ford Academy	82926	Wayne County RESA	Wayne	Wayne RESA	26 Aug 1997	9-12	GenEd,SpecEd
Highland Park Public School Academy	82749	Wayne County RESA	Wayne	Highland Park City Schools	27 Jul 2012	KG, 1-8	GenEd,PK,SpecEd,SuppVirt
Highpoint Virtual Academy of Michigan	83900	Wexford-Missaukee ISD	Wexford	Messick Consolidated Schools	01 Jul 2016	KG, 1-12	GenEd,SpecEd,FTVirtual,FaceVirt
Holly Academy	63911	Oakland ISD	Oakland	Central Michigan University	01 Sep 1999	KG,1-8	GenEd,SpecEd
Holly Park Academy	33910	Ingham ISD	Ingham	Bay Mills Community College	08 Sep 2009	KG, 1-8	GenEd,SpecEd
Honey Creek Community School	81901	Washtenaw ISD	Washtenaw	Washtenaw ISD	05 Sep 1995	KG,1-8	GenEd,SpecEd
Hope Academy	82942	Wayne County RESA	Wayne	Eastern Michigan University	24 Aug 1998	KG, 1–8	GenEd,PK,SpecEd
Hope Academy of West Michigan	41926	Kent County ISD	Kent	Ferris State University	06 Sep 2011	KG, 1-12	GenEd,SpecEd,SuppVirt
Hope of Detroit Academy	82957	Wayne County RESA	Wayne	Ferris State University	01 Sep 1999	KG,1-12	GenEd,Alt,SpecEd,SuppVirt
Horizon Science Academy New Bedford	58901	Monroe ISD	Monroe	Ferris State University	19 Aug 1998	KG,1-8	GenEd,PK,SpecEd,SuppVirt
Huron Academy	50903	Macomb ISD	Macomb	Ferris State University	01 Sep 1999	KG,1-8	GenEd,SpecEd,SuppVirt
ICademy Global	70909	Ottawa Area ISD	Ottawa	Lake Superior State University	01 Jul 2013	KG,1-12	GenEd,SpecEd,FTVirtual
Infinity Institute of Learning	82752	Wayne County RESA	Wayne	Detroit Public Schools Community District	01 Jul 2023	4-12	GenEd,Alt,SpecEd,Delinq
Inkster Preparatory Academy	82762	Wayne County RESA	Wayne	Central Michigan University	01 Jul 2016	KG, 1-8	GenEd,PK,SpecEd
Innocademy	70908	Ottawa Area ISD	Ottawa	Lake Superior State University	01 Jul 2012	KG,1-8	GenEd,PK,Alt,SpecEd
Innocademy Allegan Campus	03900	Allegan Area ESA	Allegan	Lake Superior State University	01 Jul 2014	KG,1-8	GenEd,PK,SpecEd
Insight School of Michigan	23903	Eaton RESA	Eaton	Central Michigan University	01 Jul 2014	9-12	GenEd,Alt,SpecEd,FTVirtual,PCE
International Academy of Flint	25905	Genesee ISD	Genesee	Central Michigan University	01 Sep 1999	KG, 1–12	GenEd,SpecEd
Invictus Classical Academy	50922	Macomb ISD	Macomb	Bay Mills Community College	01 Jul 2026	KG,1-8	GenEd,SpecEd
Island City Academy	23901	Genesee ISD	Eaton	Central Michigan University	03 Sep 1996	KG,1-8	GenEd,SpecEd
Ivywood Classical Academy	82767	Wayne County RESA	Wayne	Central Michigan University	01 Jul 2019	KG, 1-12	GenEd,SpecEd
Jackson Preparatory & Early College	38900	Jackson ISD	Jackson	Jackson College	01 Jul 2014	6-12	GenEd,SpecEd,SuppVirt
Jalen Rose Leadership Academy	82728	Wayne County RESA	Wayne	Central Michigan University	06 Sep 2011	9-12	GenEd,SpecEd,SuppVirt
The James and Grace Lee Boggs School	82706	Wayne County RESA	Wayne	Eastern Michigan University	01 Jul 2013	KG,1-8	GenEd,SpecEd
Joseph K. Lumsden Bahweting Anishnabe Academy	17901	Eastern Upper Peninsula ISD	Chippewa	Northern Michigan University	28 Sep 1995	KG,1-8	GenEd,SpecEd
Joy Preparatory Academy	82958	Wayne County RESA	Wayne	Ferris State University	01 Sep 2003	KG,1-8	GenEd,PK,SpecEd,SchlChoice,SuppVirt
Kalamazoo Prep Academy	39911	Kalamazoo RESA	Kalamazoo	Grand Valley State University	02 Jan 2017	9-12	GenEd,Alt,SpecEd,PCE,SuppVirt
Kensington Woods Schools	47901	Livingston ESA	Livingston	Central Michigan University	05 Sep 1995	6-12	GenEd,SpecEd
Keys Grace Academy	63911	Oakland Schools	Oakland	Madison District Public Schools	01 Jul 2015	KG,1-8	GenEd,SpecEd
Keystone Academy	82976	Wayne County RESA	Wayne	Bay Mills Community College	19 Aug 2003	KG, 1-8	GenEd,SpecEd
Kingsbury Country Day School	63934	Oakland Schools	Oakland	Saginaw Valley State University	01 Jul 2013	KG,1-8	GenEd,PK,SpecEd
KIPP Detroit Imani Academy	82775	Wayne County RESA	Wayne	Central Michigan University	01 Jul 2022	KG, 1-4	GenEd,SpecEd
Knapp Charter Academy	41914	Kent County ISD	Kent	Grand Valley State University	02 Sep 1997	KG,1-8	GenEd,SpecEd
Lake Superior Academy	17900	Eastern Upper Peninsula ISD	Chippewa	Bay Mills Community College	01 Jul 2016	KG,1-5	GenEd,SpecEd,SuppVirt
Landmark Academy	74903	St. Clair County RESA	St. Clair	Saginaw Valley State University	01 Sep 1999	KG,1-12	GenEd,PK,Alt,SpecEd,PCE,SuppVirt
Laurus Academy	63918	Oakland ISD	Oakland	Bay Mills Community College	23 Aug 2004	KG,1-8	GenEd,SpecEd
Learn4Life Pontiac	63920	Oakland ISD	Oakland	Ferris State University	13 Sep 2004	9-12	GenEd,Alt,SpecEd,PCE,FaceVirt
Leelanau Montessori Public School Academy	45901	Northwest Education Services	Leelanau	Bay Mills Community College	07 Sep 2010	KG,1-6	GenEd,PK,SpecEd
Legacy Charter Academy	82723	Wayne County RESA	Wayne	Grand Valley State University	07 Sep 2010	KG, 1-8	GenEd,SpecEd
LifeTech Academy	23900	Genesee ISD	Eaton	Eaton Rapids Public Schools	01 Jul 2013	KG,1-12	GenEd,SpecEd,PCE,FaceVirt
Light of the World Academy	47900	Livingston ESA	Livingston	Grand Valley State University	01 Jul 2015	KG,1-8	GenEd,SpecEd,SuppVirt
Lighthouse Academy - Barry County	41922	Kent County ISD	Barry	Ferris State University	01 Jul 2024	6-12	GenEd,Alt,SpecEd
Lighthouse Academy - Kent County	41922	Kent County ISD	Kent	Ferris State University	02 Sep 2008	KG, 1-12	GenEd,Alt,SpecEd,Delinq,PCE,SuppVirt
Lighthouse Academy - Mecosta County	41922	Kent County ISD	Mecosta	Ferris State University	01 Jul 2016	KG, 1-12	, GenEd,Alt,SpecEd,Negl,SuppVirt
Lighthouse Academy - Muskegon County	41922	Kent County ISD	Muskegon	Ferris State University	01 Jul 2014	5-12	Alt,Delinq,JuvDtn,SuppVirt
Lighthouse Academy - Ottawa County	41922	Kent County ISD	Ottawa	Ferris State University	01 Jul 2021	3-12	GenEd,Alt,SpecEd,Delinq,JuvDtn,SuppVirt
Lighthouse Connections Academy	63939	Oakland ISD	Oakland	Oakland Schools	02 Jul 2018	KG, 1-12	GenEd,SpecEd,FTVirtual
Lincoln-King Adams-Young Academy	82773	Wayne County RESA	Wayne	Grand Valley State University	19 Dec 2019	KG,1-12	GenEd,SpecEd
Linden Charter Academy	25907	Genesee ISD	Genesee	Central Michigan University	01 Sep 1999	KG,1-8	GenEd,SpecEd
Livingston Classical Academy	81913	Washtenaw ISD	Washtenaw	Whitmore Lake Public Schools	01 Jul 2016	KG,1-12	GenEd,SpecEd,SuppVirt
MacDowell Preparatory Academy	82747	Wayne County RESA	Wayne	Detroit Public Schools	17 Aug 2012	KG,1-8	GenEd,PK,SpecEd,SuppVirt
Macomb Academy	50901	Macomb ISD	Macomb	Central Michigan University	18 Sep 1995	12	GenEd,SpecEd
Macomb Montessori Academy	50914	Macomb ISD	Macomb	Lake Superior State University	03 Sep 2013	KG, 1-6	GenEd,PK,SpecEd,SuppVirt
Madison Academy	25911	Genesee ISD	Genesee	Bay Mills Community College	07 Sep 2004	KG, 1-12	GenEd,Alt,SpecEd,SuppVirt
Madison-Carver Academy	82742	Wayne County RESA	Wayne	Grand Valley State University	01 Jul 2012	KG,1-8	GenEd,SpecEd
Marshall Academy	13903	Calhoun ISD	Calhoun	Ferris State University	01 Sep 2000	KG,1-12	GenEd,SpecEd,SuppVirt
Martin Luther King, Jr. Education Center Academy	82910	Wayne County RESA	Wayne	Saginaw Valley State University	01 Oct 1995	KG,1-8	Alt,GenEd,SpecEd
Merritt Academy	50906	Macomb ISD	Macomb	Saginaw Valley State University	27 Aug 2002	KG, 1-12	GenEd,PK,SpecEd,SuppVirt
Metro Charter Academy	82967	Wayne County RESA	Wayne	Grand Valley State University	01 Sep 2000	KG,1-8	GenEd,SpecEd
Michigan Collegiate	50902	Macomb ISD	Macomb	Ferris State University	01 Sep 1999	KG, 1-12	GenEd,PK,Alt,SpecEd,SuppVirt
Michigan Connections Academy	33911	Ingham ISD	Ingham	Ferris State University	07 Sep 2010	KG, 1-12	GenEd,SpecEd,FTVirtual
Michigan Educational Choice Center	82751	Wayne County RESA	Wayne	Central Michigan University	01 Sep 2012	KG,1-8	GenEd,PK,SpecEd
Michigan Great Lakes Virtual Academy	51905	Manistee ISD	Manistee	Manistee Area Public Schools	01 Jul 2013	KG,1-12	GenEd,PK,SpecEd,FaceVirt
Michigan International Prep School	19900	Clinton County RESA	Clinton	Ovid-Elsie Area Schools	01 Jul 2017	KG,1-12	GenEd,Alt,SpecEd,FTVirtual,PCE
Michigan Mathematics and Science Academy	63924	Macomb ISD	Macomb	Grand Valley State University	08 Sep 2009	KG, 1-12	GenEd,PK,SpecEd
Michigan Online School	63924	Van Buren ISD	Van Buren	Gobles Public Schools	02 Jan 2018	KG, 1-12	GenEd,SpecEd,FTVirtual
Michigan Virtual Charter Academy	41925	Oakland ISD	Oakland	Hazel Park Schools	07 Sep 2010	KG, 1-12	GenEd,SpecEd,FTVirtual
Mid-Michigan Leadership Academy	33904	Ingham ISD	Ingham	Central Michigan University	03 Sep 1996	KG,1-8	GenEd,PK,SpecEd
Mildred C. Wells Preparatory Academy	11904	Berrien RESA	Berrien	Bay Mills Community College	06 Sep 2005	KG, 1-8	GenEd,SpecEd,SuppVirt
Mill Creek Academy	28905	Northwest Education Services	Grand Traverse	Elk Rapids Schools	01 Jul 2024	KG, 1-5	GenEd,SpecEd
Momentum Academy	63928	Oakland ISD	Oakland	Lake Superior State University	01 Jul 2013	KG, 1-8	GenEd,PK,SpecEd,SuppVirt
Mt. Clemens Montessori Academy	50908	Macomb ISD	Macomb	Bay Mills Community College	25 Aug 2003	KG,1-5	GenEd,PK,SpecEd,SuppVirt
Multicultural Academy	81908	Washtenaw ISD	Washtenaw	Bay Mills Community College	09 Sep 2004	KG,1-12	GenEd,PK,SpecEd,SuppVirt
Muskegon Heights Public School Academy System	61905	Muskegon Area ISD	Muskegon	Muskegon Heights Public Schools	01 Jul 2012	KG,1-12	Alt,GenEd,PK,SpecEd
Muskegon Lakeshore High School & Career Center	61906	Muskegon Area ISD	Muskegon	Grand Valley State University	01 Jul 2014	9-12	GenEd,Alt,SpecEd,PCE,SuppVirt
Muskegon Montessori Academy for Environmental Change	61900	Muskegon Area ISD	Muskegon	Ferris State University	01 Jul 2013	KG,1-8	GenEd,PK,SpecEd,SuppVirt
Nah Tah Wahsh Public School Academy	55901	Delta-Schoolcraft ISD	Menominee	Northern Michigan University	28 Apr 1995	KG,1-12	Alt,GenEd,SpecEd
New Branches Charter Academy	41901	Kent County ISD	Kent	Central Michigan University	29 Aug 1995	KG, 1-8	GenEd,Alt,SpecEd,SuppVirt
New Dawn Academy of Warren	50920	Macomb ISD	Macomb	Saginaw Valley State University	01 Jul 2022	KG, 1-10	GenEd,PK,SpecEd,SuppVirt
New Paradigm College Prep	82713	Wayne County RESA	Wayne	Grand Valley State University	01 Jul 2014	KG,1-8	GenEd,PK,SpecEd
New Paradigm Glazer-Loving Academy	82735	Wayne County RESA	Wayne	Grand Valley State University	08 Sep 2011	KG,1-8	GenEd,SpecEd
NexTech High School	41829	Kent ISD	Kent	Central Michigan University	01 Jul 2012	9-12	GenEd,SpecEd,SuppVirt
The New Standard Academy	25912	Genesee ISD	Genesee	Saginaw Valley State University	01 Jul 2012	KG, 1-12	GenEd,PK,SpecEd,SuppVirt
Noor International Academy	50913	Macomb ISD	Macomb	Central Michigan University	06 Sep 2011	KG, 1-6	GenEd,PK,SpecEd
North Saginaw Charter Academy	73910	Saginaw ISD	Saginaw	Central Michigan University	01 Sep 1999	KG,1-8	GenEd,SpecEd
North Star Academy	52901	Marquette-Alger RESA	Marquette	Northern Michigan University	02 Sep 1997	KG, 1-8	GenEd,PK,SpecEd
Northridge Academy	25904	Genesee ISD	Genesee	Ferris State University	01 Sep 1999	KG,1-8	GenEd,PK,Alt,SpecEd,SuppVirt
Oakland Academy	39903	Kalamazoo RESA	Kalamazoo	Grand Valley State University	01 Aug 1998	KG, 1-8	GenEd,SpecEd,SuppVirt
Oakland FlexTech High School	63931	Oakland Schools	Oakland	Central Michigan University	01 Jul 2013	9-12	GenEd,Alt,SpecEd,SuppVirt
Oakland International Academy	63912	Wayne County RESA	Wayne	Saginaw Valley State University	01 Sep 1999	KG,1-12	GenEd,PK,SpecEd,SuppVirt
Oakside Prep Academy	63909	Oakland Schools	Oakland	Bay Mills Community College	01 Jul 2013	KG, 1-12	GenEd,SpecEd
Ojibwe Charter School	17902	Eastern Upper Peninsula ISD	Chippewa	Bay Mills Community College	10 Sep 2003	KG-Part, 1–12	Alt,GenEd,SpecEd
Old Mission Peninsula School	28900	Northwest Education Services	Grand Traverse	Grand Valley State University	02 Jul 2018	KG,1-5	GenEd,SpecEd,SuppVirt
Outlook Academy	03902	Allegan ISD	Allegan	Allegan Area ESA	21 Aug 2002	5-12	GenEd,Alt,SpecEd,Delinq,JuvDtn,PCE,SuppVirt
Pansophia Academy	12901	Branch ISD	Branch	Central Michigan University	05 Sep 1995	KG,1-12	GenEd,SpecEd,SuppVirt
Paragon Charter Academy	38902	Jackson ISD	Jackson	Grand Valley State University	01 Sep 1998	KG,1-8	GenEd,SpecEd
Paramount Charter Academy	39905	Kalamazoo RESA	Kalamazoo	Bay Mills Community College	01 Sep 1998	KG, 1-8	GenEd,PK,SpecEd
Pathways Academy	82737	Wayne County RESA	Wayne	Detroit Public Schools Community District	01 Jul 2014	7-12	GenEd,Alt,SpecEd,PCE
Pembroke Academy	82765	Wayne County RESA	Wayne	Central Michigan University	02 Jul 2018	KG, 1-8	GenEd,Alt,SpecEd,PCE
Pillars Academy	63940	Oakland ISD	Oakland	Ferris State University	01 Jul 2025	KG,1-8	GenEd,SpecEd
Pittsfield Acres Academy	81915	Washtenaw ISD	Washtenaw	Ferris State University	01 Jul 2022	KG,1-5	GenEd,PK,SpecEd
Plymouth Scholars Charter Academy	82743	Wayne County RESA	Wayne	Bay Mills Community College	01 Jul 2012	KG,1-8	GenEd,SpecEd
Pontiac Academy for Excellence	63906	Oakland ISD	Oakland	Saginaw Valley State University	30 Jan 1997	KG,1-12	Alt,GenEd,SpecEd
PrepNet Virtual Academy	41931	Kent ISD	Kent	Grand Valley State University	01 Jul 2020	KG,1-12	GenEd,SpecEd,FTVirtual
Presque Isle Academy	71902	Charlevoix-Emmet ISD	Presque Isle	Bay Mills Community College	21 Jan 2002	7-12	GenEd,Alt,PCE
Prevail Academy	50909	Macomb ISD	Macomb	Bay Mills Community College	23 Aug 2004	KG,1-8	GenEd,SpecEd
Purpose Charter Academy School for Law & Public Service	82777	Wayne County RESA	Wayne	Detroit Public Schools Community District	01 Jul 2026	KG,1-8	GenEd,PK,SpecEd
Quest Charter Academy	82718	Wayne County RESA	Wayne	Central Michigan University	08 Sep 2009	KG,1-8	GenEd,SpecEd
Reach Charter Academy	50912	Macomb ISD	Macomb	Grand Valley State University	02 Sep 2008	KG,1-8	GenEd,SpecEd
Red Oak Academy	50917	Macomb ISD	Wayne	Ferris State University	01 Jul 2024	KG,1-8	GenEd,SpecEd
Regent Park Scholars Charter Academy	50917	Wayne County RESA	Wayne	Lake Superior State University	06 Sep 2011	KG,1-8	GenEd,SpecEd
Relevant Academy of Eaton County	23902	Eaton RESA	Eaton	Eaton RESA	06 Sep 2011	9-12	GenEd,Alt,SpecEd,PCE,SuppVirt
Renaissance Public School Academy	37901	Gratiot-Isabella RESD	Isabella	Central Michigan University	12 Aug 1996	KG,1-8	GenEd,SpecEd,SuppVirt
Richfield Public School Academy	25910	Genesee ISD	Genesee	Bay Mills Community College	25 Aug 2003	KG,1-8	GenEd,PK,SpecEd,SchlChoice
Ridge Park Charter Academy	41919	Kent County ISD	Kent	Lake Superior State University	18 Sep 1998	KG,1-8	GenEd,SpecEd
Rising Stars Academy	50915	Macomb ISD	Macomb	Central Michigan University	01 Jul 2013	12	SpecEd
River City Scholars Charter Academy	41928	Kent County ISD	Kent	Bay Mills Community College	01 Jul 2012	KG,1-8	GenEd,SpecEd
Riverside Academy	82975	Wayne County RESA	Wayne	Central Michigan University	01 Aug 2003	KG,1-12	GenEd,PK,SpecEd,SuppVirt
Saginaw Covenant Academy	73900	Saginaw ISD	Saginaw	Grand Valley State University	01 Jul 2018	9-12	GenEd,Alt,SpecEd,AdultEd,PCE,SuppVirt
Saginaw Preparatory Academy	73908	Saginaw ISD	Saginaw	Saginaw Valley State University	15 Sep 1997	KG,1-8	GenEd,PK,SpecEd,SuppVirt
SER YouthBuild Learning Academy	82776	Wayne County RESA	Wayne	Detroit Public Schools Community District	04 Sep 2018	9-12	Alt,PCE
South Arbor Charter Academy	81905	Washtenaw ISD	Washtenaw	Central Michigan University	01 Sep 1999	KG,1-8	GenEd,SpecEd
South Canton Scholars Charter Academy	82729	Wayne County RESA	Wayne	Grand Valley State University	06 Sep 2011	KG, 1-8	GenEd,SpecEd
South Pointe Scholars Charter Academy	81912	Washtenaw ISD	Washtenaw	Northern Michigan University	01 Jul 2012	KG,1-8	GenEd,SpecEd
St. Clair County Intervention Academy	74911	St. Clair County RESA	St. Clair	St. Clair ISD	01 Sep 2004	6-12	GenEd,Alt,SpecEd,PCE
Star International Academy	82941	Wayne County RESA	Wayne	Bay Mills Community College	24 Aug 1998	KG,1-12	Alt,GenEd,PK,SpecEd
State Street Academy	09902	Bay-Arenac ISD	Bay	Bay Mills Community College	01 Sep 2001	KG,1-12	GenEd,PK,SpecEd
Success Virtual Learning Centers of Michigan	59900	Montcalm Area ISD	Montcalm	Vestaburg Community Schools	01 Dec 2016	9-12	GenEd,Alt,SpecEd,PCE,FaceVirt
Summit Academy North	82938	Wayne County RESA	Wayne	Central Michigan University	19 Aug 1998	KG,1-12	GenEd,PK,Alt,SpecEd
Taylor Exemplar Academy	82995	Wayne County RESA	Wayne	Bay Mills Community College	05 Sep 2006	KG,1-8	GenEd,SpecEd
Taylor Preparatory High School	82756	Wayne County RESA	Wayne	Grand Valley State University	01 Jul 2013	9-12	GenEd,SpecEd,SuppVirt
Three Lakes Academy	49901	Eastern Upper Peninsula ISD	Mackinac	Bay Mills Community College	03 Sep 2003	KG, 1-6	GenEd,PK,Alt,SpecEd,PCE
Three Oaks Public School Academy	61904	Muskegon Area ISD	Muskegon	Bay Mills Community College	03 Sep 2003	KG,1-6	GenEd,PK,SpecEd,SuppVirt
Timberland Academy	61902	Muskegon Area ISD	Muskegon	Grand Valley State University	02 Sep 1998	KG,1-8	GenEd,SpecEd
Tipton Academy	82754	Wayne County RESA	Wayne	Lake Superior State University	01 Jul 2013	KG, 1-8	GenEd,PK,SpecEd,SuppVirt
Trillium Academy	82973	Wayne County RESA	Wayne	Central Michigan University	11 Sep 2002	KG, 1-12	GenEd,SpecEd,SuppVirt
Triumph Academy	58902	Monroe ISD	Monroe	Bay Mills Community College	25 Aug 2004	KG, 1-8	GenEd,SpecEd
Unity Academy	50921	Macomb ISD	Macomb	Central Michigan University	01 Jul 2025	KG,1-8	GenEd,SpecEd
Universal Academy	82950	Wayne County RESA	Wayne	Oakland University	03 Nov 1998	KG,1-12	Alt,GenEd,SpecEd
Universal Learning Academy	82982	Wayne County RESA	Wayne	Bay Mills Community College	26 Sep 2007	KG,1-12	Alt,GenEd,PK,SpecEd
University Preparatory Academy (PSAD)	82702	Wayne County RESA	Wayne	Grand Valley State University	01 Jul 2008	KG-Part,1-12	GenEd,Alt,SpecEd,SuppVirt
University Preparatory Art & Design	82703	Wayne County RESA	Wayne	Grand Valley State University	08 Sep 2009	KG,1-12	GenEd,SpecEd,SuppVirt
University Preparatory Science and Math (PSAD)	82701	Wayne County RESA	Wayne	Grand Valley State University	02 Sep 2008	KG,1-12	GenEd,Alt,SpecEd,SuppVirt
University Yes Academy	82724	Wayne County RESA	Wayne	Bay Mills Community College	07 Sep 2010	KG,1-12	GenEd,SpecEd
Uplift Michigan Academy	55900	Menominee ISD	Menominee	Stephenson Area Public Schools	01 Jul 2018	KG,1-12	GenEd,Alt,SpecEd,FTVirtual,PCE
Vanderbilt Charter Academy	70905	Ottawa ISD	Ottawa	Grand Valley State University	02 Dec 1996	KG,1-8	GenEd,SpecEd
Vanguard Charter Academy	41910	Kent County ISD	Kent	Grand Valley State University	03 Dec 1996	KG,1-8	GenEd,SpecEd
Vista Charter Academy	41909	Kent County ISD	Kent	Bay Mills Community College	03 Sep 1996	KG,1-8	GenEd,SpecEd
Vista Meadows Academy	82716	Wayne County RESA	Wayne	Bay Mills Community College	02 Sep 2008	9-12	GenEd,Alt,SpecEd,PCE,SuppVirt
Voyageur Academy	82940	Wayne County RESA	Wayne	Ferris State University	19 Aug 1998	KG,1-12	GenEd,SpecEd,SuppVirt
W-A-Y Academy	82746	Wayne County RESA	Wayne	Lake Superior State University	01 Jul 2012	612	GenEd,Alt,SpecEd,PCE,FaceVirt
Walden Green Montessori	70901	Ottawa ISD	Ottawa	Central Michigan University	03 Apr 1995	KG,1-8	GenEd,SpecEd
Walker Charter Academy	41915	Kent County ISD	Kent	Grand Valley State University	02 Sep 1997	KG, 1-8	GenEd,SpecEd
Walton Charter Academy	63913	Oakland ISD	Oakland	Northern Michigan University	01 Sep 1999	KG,1-8	GenEd,SpecEd
Warrendale Charter Academy	82970	Wayne County RESA	Wayne	Grand Valley State University	01 Sep 2001	KG,1-8	GenEd,SpecEd
Washington-Parks Academy	82719	Wayne County RESA	Wayne	Grand Valley State University	09 Sep 2009	KG,1-8	GenEd,SpecEd
Washtenaw Technical Middle College	81903	Washtenaw ISD	Washtenaw	Washtenaw Community College	02 Sep 1997	9-12	Alt,GenEd,SpecEd
Waterford Montessori Academy	63929	Oakland ISD	Oakland	Saginaw Valley State University	01 Jul 2013	KG,1-8	GenEd,PK,SpecEd,SuppVirt
WAY Academy - Flint	25915	Genesee ISD	Genesee	Lake Superior State University	01 Jul 2013	7-12	GenEd,Alt,SpecEd,PCE,FaceVirt
WAY Michigan	82710	Wayne County RESA	Wayne	Central Michigan University	01 Jul 2014	6-12	GenEd,Alt,SpecEd,FTVirtual,PCE
Wellspring Preparatory High School	41923	Kent County ISD	Kent	Bay Mills Community College	07 Sep 2010	9-12	GenEd,SpecEd,SuppVirt
West Michigan Academy of Arts and Academics	70902	Ottawa ISD	Ottawa	Grand Valley State University	19 Aug 1996	KG, 1-8	GenEd,Alt,SpecEd,SuppVirt
West MI Academy of Environmental Science	41904	Kent County ISD	Kent	Central Michigan University	28 Aug 1995	KG,1-12	GenEd,PK,SpecEd,SuppVirt
West Michigan Aviation Academy	41924	Kent ISD	Grand Rapids	Grand Valley State University	07 Sep 2010	9-12	GenEd,SpecEd,SuppVirt
West Village Academy	82959	Wayne County RESA	Wayne	Central Michigan University	01 Sep 1999	KG, 1-8	GenEd,SpecEd,SuppVirt
Westfield Charter Academy	82766	Wayne County RESA	Wayne	Grand Valley State University	01 Jul 2019	KG, 1-12	GenEd,SpecEd,SuppVirt
Weston Preparatory Academy	82943	Wayne County RESA	Wayne	Oakland University	01 Sep 1998	KG, 1-8	GenEd,SpecEd,SuppVirt
Will Carleton Charter School Academy	30902	Hillsdale ISD	Hillsdale	Hillsdale ISD	01 Aug 1998	KG, 1-12	GenEd,SpecEd,SuppVirt
William C. Abney Academy	41917	Kent County ISD	Kent	Ferris State University	01 Aug 1998	KG, 1-7	GenEd,SpecEd
Windemere Park Charter Academy	33909	Ingham ISD	Ingham	Grand Valley State University	01 Sep 1999	KG, 1-8	GenEd,SpecEd
Windover High School	56901	Midland County ESA	Midland	Midland County ESA	30 Aug 1995	9-12	GenEd,Alt,SpecEd,SuppVirt
Woodland Park Academy	25902	Genesee ISD	Genesee	Central Michigan University	06 Jan 1996	KG, 1–8	GenEd,SpecEd
Woodland School	28901	Traverse Bay Area ISD	Grand Traverse	Saginaw Valley State University	03 Sep 1996	KG, 1–8	GenEd,SpecEd
Youth Advancement Academy	39906	Kalamazoo RESA	Kalamazoo	Kalamazoo RESA	02 Sep 2008	6-12	GenEd,Alt,FaceVirt

== Defunct/Former Schools ==
=== A ===
- Academy for Technology and Enterprise (closed 2009)
- Academy of Flint (closed 2013)
- Academy of Health and Science (closed 2000)
- Academy of Inkster (closed 2010)
- Academy of International Studies (closed 2017)
- Academy of Michigan (closed 2007)
- Academy of Oak Park (multiple schools; last closed 2010)
- Academy of Southfield (closed 2015)
- Academy of Waterford (closed 2016)
- Academy of Westland (closed 2012)
- ACE Academy (multiple schools; last closed 2021)
- Aisha Shule/WEB Dubois Prep (closed 2013)
- Allen Academy (closed 2016)
- Alternative Path Academy (closed 2014)
- Andrew Young Early College Academy (closed 2013)
- Ann Arbor Learning Community (closed 2022)
- Augusta Academy (closed 2022)

=== B ===
- Barack Obama Leadership Academy (closed 2026)
- Beacon International Academy (closed 2003)
- Ben Ross Public School Academy (closed 2012)
- Benito Juarez Academy (closed 2002)
- Benjamin Carson Academy (closed 2006)
- Bingham Arts Academy (closed 2015)
- Blanche Kelso Bruce Academy (multiple schools; last closed 2017)
- Blue Water Learning Academy (closed 2015)
- The Building Trades School (closed 2022)
- Business Entrepreneurship, Science, Tech Academy (closed 2012)

=== C ===
- Capital Area Academy (closed 2011)
- Casa Richard Academy (closed 2014)
- Catherine Ferguson Academy (closed 2014)
- Center Academy (closed 2012)
- Center for Literacy and Creativity (closed 2013)
- Charlevoix Academy (closed 2023)
- Charlotte Forten Academy (closed 2008)
- Cherry Hill School of Performing Arts (closed 2010)
- Clara B. Ford Academy (closed 2026)
- Colin Powell Academy (closed 2010)
- Cornerstone Health and Technology School (closed 2021)
- Creative Learning Academy (closed 2012)
- Curtis House Academy (closed 1999)

=== D ===
- Deer Trail Academy (closed 2014)
- Detroit Advantage Academy (closed 2005)
- Detroit Collegiate High School (closed 2020)
- Detroit Delta Preparatory Academy for Social Justice (closed 2018)
- Detroit Midtown Academy (closed 2012)
- Detroit Public Safety Academy (closed 2026)
- Detroit West Preparatory Academy (multiple schools; last closed 2014)
- Discovery Arts and Technology PSA (closed 2013)
- Discovery Elementary School (closed 2009)
- Dr. Charles Drew Academy (closed 2014)
- Drive One Career Technical High School (closed 2021)

=== E ===
- Eagle's Nest Academy (closed 2026)
- Early Career Academy (closed 2016)
- El-Hajj Malik El-Shabazz Academy (closed 2019)
- Elbert T. Clark Academy (closed 2001)
- Evergreen Academy (closed 2020)
- Experiencia Preparatory Academy (closed 2016)
- Explore Academy Livonia (closed 2023)

=== F ===
- Family Institute Early Childhood Academy (closed 2001)
- Forest Academy (closed 2023)
- Francis Street Primary School (closed 2023)
- Frederick Douglass International Academy (closed 2018)

=== G ===
- Gateway Middle/High School (closed 2007)
- George Washington Academy (closed 1998)
- Global Preparatory Academy (closed 2020)
- Grand Rapids Ellington Academy of Arts & Technology (closed 2017)
- Great Lakes Anchor Academy (closed 2016)
- Great Lakes Exploration Academy (closed 2016)

=== H ===
- HEART Academy (closed 2014)
- Hillsdale Preparatory School (closed 2026)
- Hinoki International School (closed 2015)
- Horizons Community High School (closed 2008)

=== I ===
- Innocademy Pyramid Campus (closed 2016)
- International Academy of Detroit (closed 2015)
- International Academy of Saginaw (closed 2025)

=== J ===
- Jackson Arts and Technology PSA (closed 2011)
- Jefferson International Academy (closed 2018)

=== K ===
- Kalamazoo Advantage Academy (closed 2008)
- Kenquest Academy (closed 1996)
- King Academy (closed 2005)

=== L ===
- Lakeshore Public Academy (closed 2007)
- Lakeside Charter School - Albion (closed 2020)
- Lakeside Charter School - Kalamazoo (closed 2020)
- Leaders Preparatory Academy (closed 2011)
- Learn, Live, Lead Academy (closed 2013)
- Life Skills Center of Metropolitan Detroit (closed 2010)

=== M ===
- Mackinac Preparatory Academy (closed 2016)
- Martin L. Winans Academy of Performing Arts (closed 2023)
- McGivney Academy (closed 2011)
- Metropolitan Transitional Academy (closed 2003)
- Michigan Institute for Construction Trades (closed 2002)
- Michigan Health Academy (closed 2011)
- Michigan School for the Arts (closed 2017)
- Michigan Technical Academy (multiple schools; last closed 2017)
- Midland Academy of Advanced and Creative Studies (closed 2019)
- Morey Montessori Public School Academy (closed 2017)
- Muskegon Maritime Academy (closed 2026)

=== N ===
- Nataki Talibah Schoolhouse of Detroit (closed 2016)
- Navigator Academy (closed 2004)
- New Beginnings Academy (closed 2018)
- New City Academy (closed 2010)
- New Hope Public School Academy (closed 2021)
- New Horizon Academy (closed 2001)
- New School for Creative Learning (closed 1998)
- New School High (closed 2023)
- Newland Academy of Arts & Science (closed 2001)
- NexTech High School of Lansing (closed 2022)
- NexTech High School of Metro Detroit (closed 2018)
- Northlane Math & Science Academy (closed 1997)
- Northpointe Academy (closed 2014)
- Nsoroma Institute (closed 2013)

=== O ===
- Oakland County Academy of Media & Technology (closed 2023)
- Oakland-Macomb Montessori Academy (closed 2015)
- Oasis Academy (closed 2002)
- Old Redford Academy (multiple schools; last closed 2026)
- Orchard Academy (closed 2022)

=== P-Q ===
- The Paris Academy (closed 2018)
- Pathfinder Charter Academy (closed 1998)
- Pathways Global Leadership Academy (closed 2017)
- Pierre Toussaint Academy (closed 2013)
- Plymouth Educational Center Charter School (multiple schools; last closed 2024)
- Questar Academy (closed 2002)

=== R ===
- Regents Academy (closed 2018)
- River Heights Academy (closed 2023)
- Ross-Hill Academy (closed 2017)
- Royal Academy of Michigan (closed 2021)
- Rutherford Winans Academy (closed 2025)

=== S ===
- Saginaw Academy of Excellence (closed 2023)
- Saginaw County Transition Academy (closed 2013)
- Saginaw Learn to Earn Academy (closed 2020)
- Saginaw Preparatory PSA (closed 1997)
- Sankofa Shule (closed 2007)
- Sankore Marine Immersion High School Academy (closed 2002)
- Schools for the Future Detroit (closed 2015)
- Shoreline Academy of Business and Trades (closed 2005)
- Sierra Leone Education Outreach Academy (closed 1998)
- Sigma Academy for Leadership and Early Middle College (closed 2023)
- Southwest Detroit Community School (closed 2019)
- St. Clair County Career Prep Academy (closed 2015)
- St. Clair County Learning Academy (closed 2015)
- Starr Detroit Academy (closed 2017)
- Success Mile Academy (closed 2018)
- Sunrise Education Center (closed 2012)

=== T ===
- Taylor International Academy (closed 2017)
- Thomas-Gist Academy (closed 2009)
- Threshold Academy (closed 2014)
- Traverse City College Preparatory Academy (closed 2013)
- Tri-Valley Academy of Arts and Academics (closed 2008)
- Turtle Island Learning Circle (closed 1998)

=== U-V ===
- University YES Academy East (closed 2013)
- Victory Academy Charter School (closed 2012)
- Virtual Learning Academy of St. Clair County (closed 2026)

=== W ===
- Walter French Academy (closed 2004)
- Wavecrest Career Academy (closed 2014)
- WayPoint Academy (closed 2013)
- West Michigan Academy for Hospitality Science (closed 2003)
- White Pine Academy (closed 2023)
- Wolverine Academy SDA (closed 2015)
- Woodmont Academy (closed 2012)
- Woodward Academy (closed 2017)
- WSC Academy (closed 2023)
