= Catherine Ferguson Academy =

Publicly funded charter school in Detroit, Michigan (USA)

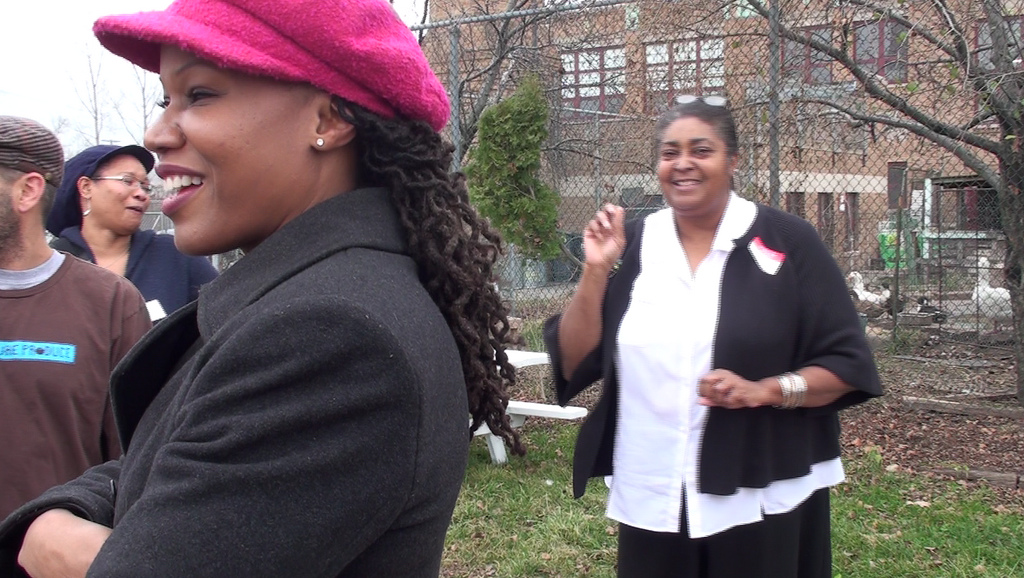
- School building in background with principal Andrews giving a tour (December 2009)

Location
- 2750 Selden Street; Detroit, Michigan 48208; 42.34062°N 83.08977°W

Information
- School type: Charter operated, public funding
- School district: Independent Charter through Wayne RESA (2013-2014); Blanche Kelso Bruce School District (2011-2013); Detroit Public Schools (1986-2011)
- Principal: Asenath Andrews
- Grades: 9-12
- Enrollment: 92 (2014)
- Language: English
- Area: Urban

Catherine Ferguson Academy (CFA) was a public high school in Detroit, Michigan for pregnant girls and teen mothers, in operation from 1986 through 2014. The school had an urban farm in its backyard and provided day care and preschool education for the students' children.

CFA received awards and was the subject of documentaries and media coverage due to its academic success. During 2010, its last full year of operation as a school district-operated public school, it boasted a 97 percent attendance rate and a 90 percent high school graduation rate, with the vast majority of students going on to either a two or a four-year college.

As a member of Detroit Public Schools, it was under control of an Emergency Manager and scheduled to be shut in June 2011 as part of a system-wide deficit reduction plan. Protests and national media attention focused on keeping the school open, and the school's operations were privatized under a new district created for Blanche Kelso Bruce Academy, a charter operator with local ties. As of August 2011, state and federal funds amounting to $13,500 per student were to be going to the charter operator who ran the school on a for-profit basis.

== Background ==
Catherine Ferguson Academy was founded in Detroit, Michigan in 1986 as a public school for pregnant girls and teen mothers. It was named after a freed slave who dedicated herself to education, though she was never allowed to learn to read or attend school as a child. CFA was housed in a former elementary school building which is about 90 years old, and had an urban farm in its backyard where the students learn to grow vegetables as well as other skills required for self-sufficiency. Most students came from lower income backgrounds—about 78 percent qualified for free or reduced meal programs—and 97 percent were of African American descent. During the 2010 school year, CFA had a 97 percent attendance rate and a 90 percent high school graduation rate, with the vast majority of students going on to either a two or a four-year college. CFA was converted from a public to a charter school in the fall of 2011.

The Academy was profiled in Oprah Magazine in 2008, and on the Rachel Maddow Show of April 22, 2011. It won the Breakthrough High School award in 2004 given by the National Association of Secondary School Principals for outstanding achievement among schools with high poverty rates. CFA was the subject of a 2010 award-winning documentary, "Grown in Detroit" by Dutch filmmakers Mascha and Manfred Poppenk in 2010. In 2010 Rev. Jesse Jackson honored the film with the NCRC 'Community Empowerment Film Award'.

== Admissions ==
Incoming students were required be pregnant or have children. Some students lied to gain admission to the school by borrowing infants and representing them as their own or by using forged urine samples with those of pregnant friends. Mark Binelli, author of Detroit City is the Place to Be, wrote that this was due to Ferguson's "sterling reputation".

== Curriculum ==
Catherine Ferguson Academy, along with the other schools in the Blanche Kelso Bruce Academy School District, adopted a project-based learning model called "Big Picture Learning" beginning in the 2012–13 school year. In addition, it provided child care for infants and early education for toddlers.

== Closing controversy, conversion, and eventual closure ==
CFA was slated to close at the end of the 2010–2011 school year by order of the Emergency Manager of the Detroit Public Schools, Robert Bobb, if a buyer could not be found. The closure or sale was part of the Emergency Manager's deficit reduction plan to consolidate public high schools and increase class sizes to 60 students by 2013.

A buyer was not found by the spring of 2011, and the school was scheduled to be shuttered. CFA students and teachers protested the decision by staging a sit-in and occupying the school during spring break, with 10 of the protesters arrested by the Detroit Police on April 16, 2011. Several of those arrested were charged with trespassing, but all charges were dropped in August 2011. Additional community reaction to the announced closing of CFA, and national media publicity, resulted in weeks of protest. Staff from CFA were promised 20 minutes to present their arguments for keeping the school open at a meeting to be held before Emergency Manager Bobb in early May— but the meeting was cancelled.

On June 16, 2011 one hour before a public protest and rally, which included Danny Glover, was to begin, it was announced that CFA would remain open as a charter school. Critics called the decision a partial victory only because the school would no longer be subject to the legal requirements of public schools. Evans Solutions, a for-profit educational management organization, was announced to run the school as part of its Blanche Kelso Bruce School District which runs charter schools in juvenile detention facilities and involuntary residential facilities. CFA remained tuition-free to students with operating funds of approximately $13,500 per student provided to the charter operator by state and federal programs.

Blair Evans, CEO of Evans Solutions, announced that the school's programs would continue unchanged, however, the staff would have to work in a "non-union environment". Several teachers would not be returning to the school because it would no longer be part of the Detroit Public Schools system. G. Asenath Andrews, the school's principal since 1986, said new teachers would be hired and that as a result of the school's privatization, the students would have more access to funds and services than before. The school already had farm animals such as goats, chickens, roosters and seasonally a horse.

CFA separated from the Blanche Kelso Bruce school district and was awarded an independent charter through Wayne RESA in 2013. As an independent charter, it was considered its own school district, and Asenath Andrews became superintendent; former assistant principal Darnetta Banks became principal. Enrollment declined, however, and CFA closed on June 30, 2014. The Detroit Public Schools chartered a school, Pathways Academy, to replace CFA and now serves the needs of pregnant Detroit students and their children.

== See also ==
- Catherine Ferguson (educator)
- List of public school academy districts in Michigan
- Urban agriculture
- Small house movement
