= Catherine Ferguson =

Catherine Ferguson may refer to:

- Catherine Ferguson Academy, Detroit Public School
- Catherine Ferguson (educator), American educator who was born a slave
- Cathy Ferguson, American swimmer
- Kate Lee Ferguson, American writer
- Kit Coleman, Canadian newspaper columnist (born Catherine Ferguson)
