= Blanche Kelso Bruce Academy =

High school in Detroit, Wayne County, Michigan

Coordinates: 42°22′24.9″N 83°04′46.9″W

Blanche Kelso Bruce Academy was the name given to several charter schools within the Detroit Public Schools in Detroit, Michigan, serving students in grades 5–12. They functioned as alternative schools for Youth Outside the Educational Mainstream (YOEM). Most of the schools were strict-discipline academies for students who had been expelled from regular schools. The schools were named after Blanche Bruce, the first African American to serve a full term as a United States senator.

Schools which operated under the Blanche Kelso Bruce Academy umbrella included:

- Don Bosco - DePaul Youth Treatment Center on 609 E. Grand Blvd., Detroit, MI 48207
- Samaritan Center on 5555 Conner St, Detroit, MI 48213
- St Jude Center on 15255 Mayfield, Detroit, MI 48205
- Victor Center on 1200 Alter Road, Detroit, MI 48215
- Wayne County Juvenile Detention Facility on 1326 St. Antoine, Detroit, MI 48226
- Wolverine Shelter on 2629 Lenox St., Detroit, MI 48201
- BKBA West at 2750 Selden St., Detroit, MI 48208
- Catherine Ferguson Academy at 2750 Selden St., Detroit, MI 48208

Blanche Kelso Bruce Academies were chartered through Wayne RESA and are managed by Blair Evans of Evans Solutions. The Blanche Kelso Bruce Academy School District's central offices were located at 8045 Second Ave., Detroit, MI 48202 ()

In June 2011 the Blanche Kelso Bruce Academy organization was selected to run the Catherine Ferguson Academy for Young Women as a charter school. The academy for pregnant teens and young mothers had been slated for closure for budgetary reasons. Blanche Kelso Bruce Academy also took over operation of the Gladys Barsamian Preparatory Center and the Hancock Center.

On June 6, 2017, the Blanche Kelso Bruce Academy announced their contract with Wayne Regional Educational Service Agency would end at the end of that school year. At the time of the closing on June 30, 2017, the academy had been operating the schools:

- Wayne County Juvenile Detention Facility on 1326 St. Antoine, Detroit, MI 48226
- Bowman House on 17200 Rowe St., Detroit, MI 48205
- DePaul Center on 609 E. Grand Blvd., Detroit, MI 48207
- Sutton House on 12040 Broadstreet, Detroit, MI 48204

== See also ==
- List of public school academy districts in Michigan
