= Henry Ford Academy =

Coordinates: 42°18′11.9″N 83°13′52″W

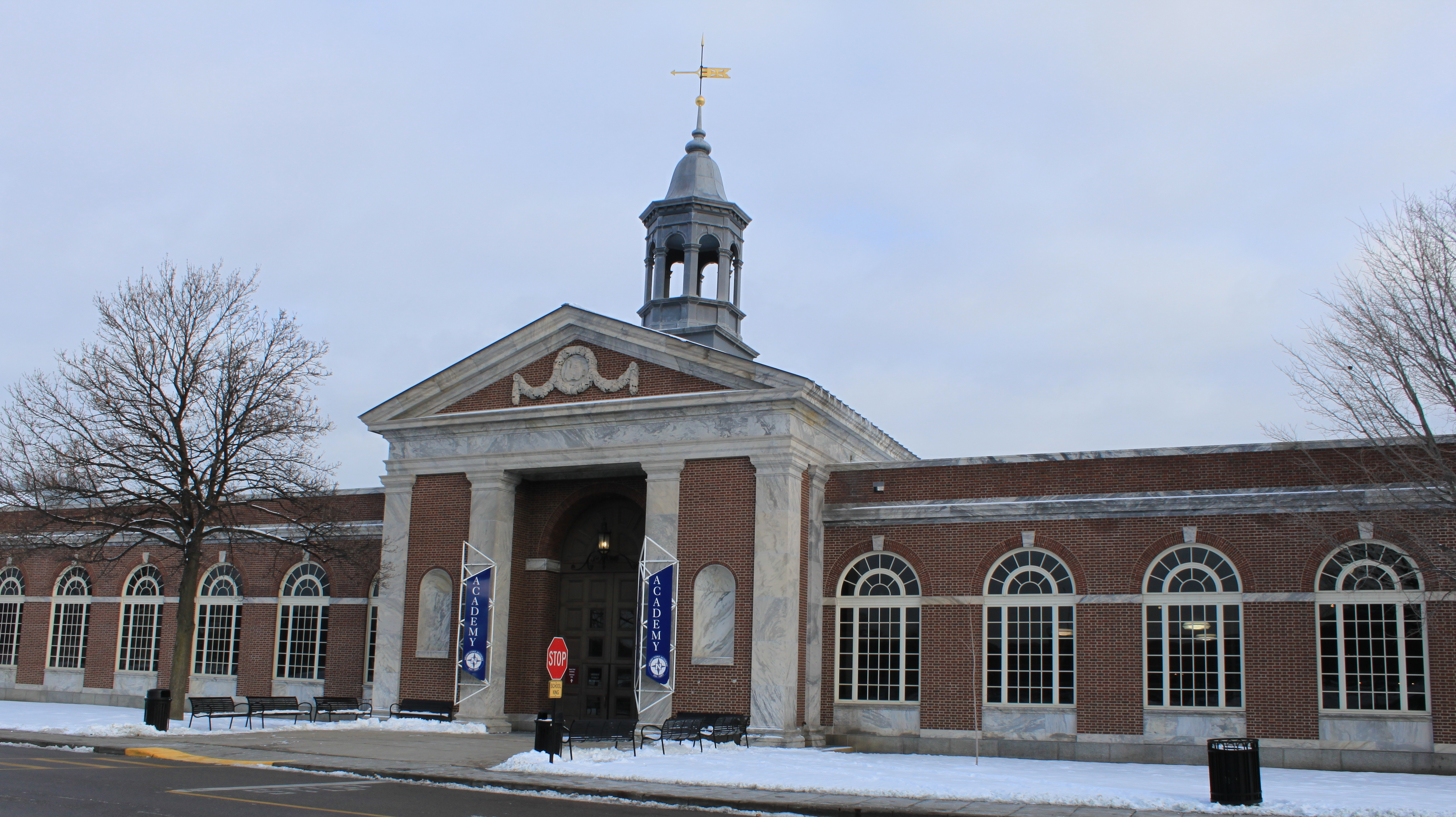

Information
- School type: Charter school
- Established: 1997; 29 years ago
- Enrollment: 467 (2010)
- Affiliation: Ford Motor Company

Henry Ford Academy is a charter school in Dearborn, Michigan, United States. It was the first such school to be developed jointly by a global corporation, public education, and a major nonprofit cultural institution. The school is sponsored by the Ford Motor Company, Wayne County Regional Educational Service Agency and The Henry Ford Museum and admits high school students. It is located on the campus of the Henry Ford museum. Enrollment is taken from a lottery in the area and totaled 467 in 2010.

Freshman meet inside the main museum building in glass walled classrooms, while older students use a converted carousel building and Pullman cars on a siding of the Greenfield Village railroad. Classes are expected to include use of the museum artifacts, a tradition of the original Village Schools. When the Museum was established in 1929, it included a school which served grades kindergarten to college/trade school ages. The last part of the original school closed in 1969. The new school restarted with a group of 100 freshman in 1997.

The Henry Ford Learning Institute is using the Henry Ford Academy model for further charter schools including Power House High School in Chicago and Alameda School for Art + Design in San Antonio, Texas.

The building received the international annual design award of the Council of Educational Facilities Planners International for 2001, the James D. MacConnell Award for outstanding new educational facilities.

== See also ==
- List of public school academy districts in Michigan
