= Derrick Walton =

American basketball player (born 1995)

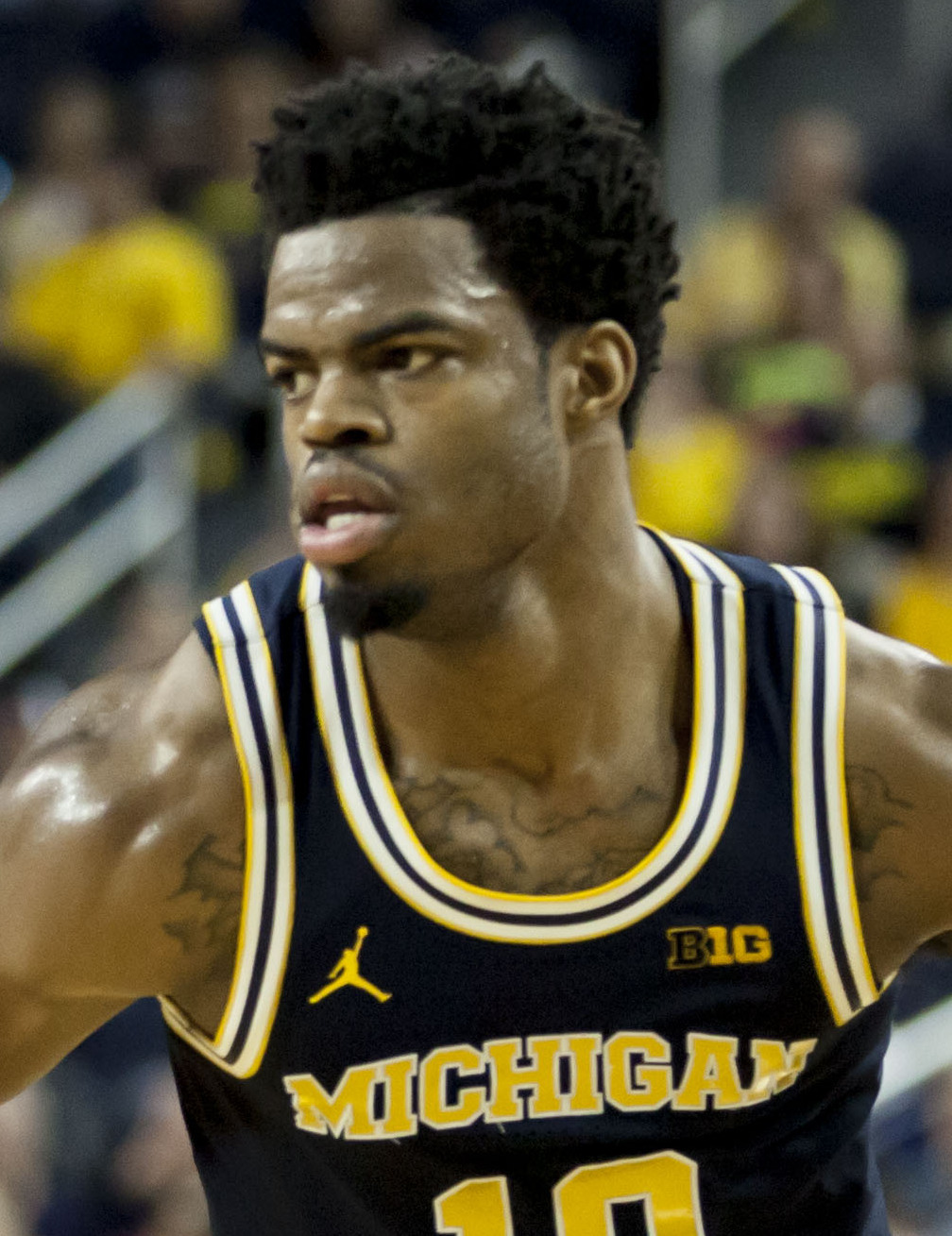
- Walton with the Michigan Wolverines in 2017

Ningbo Rockets
- Position: Point guard
- League: CBA

Personal information
- Born: April 3, 1995 (age 31) Detroit, Michigan, U.S.
- Listed height: 6 ft 1 in (1.85 m)
- Listed weight: 185 lb (84 kg)

Career information
- High school: Chandler Park Academy (Harper Woods, Michigan)
- College: Michigan (2013–2017)
- NBA draft: 2017: undrafted
- Playing career: 2017–present

Career history
- 2017–2018: Miami Heat
- 2017–2018: →Sioux Falls Skyforce
- 2018–2019: Žalgiris
- 2019: Alba Berlin
- 2019–2020: Los Angeles Clippers
- 2019–2020: →Agua Caliente Clippers
- 2020: Detroit Pistons
- 2020–2021: ASVEL
- 2021–2022: Motor City Cruise
- 2021–2022: Detroit Pistons
- 2022–2023: Sydney Kings
- 2023–2024: Zhejiang Lions
- 2024–2025: South East Melbourne Phoenix
- 2025–2026: Hapoel Holon
- 2026: Capitanes de Arecibo
- 2026–present: Ningbo Rockets

Career highlights
- NBL champion (2023); NBL Championship Series MVP (2023); All-NBL First Team (2023); NBA G League assists leader (2022); French Cup winner (2021); Second-team All-Big Ten (2017); Third-team All-Big Ten (2016); Big Ten All-Freshman team (2014); Big Ten tournament MOP (2017); First-team Parade All-American (2013); Michigan Gatorade Player of the Year (2013)
- Stats at NBA.com
- Stats at Basketball Reference

Derrick Walton Jr. (born April 3, 1995) is an American professional basketball player for the Ningbo Rockets of the Chinese Basketball Association (CBA). He played college basketball for the Michigan Wolverines and spent his first professional season as a two-way contract player with the Miami Heat and their G League affiliate, the Sioux Falls Skyforce.

He was a Parade All-American as a high school senior at Chandler Park Academy in 2013. He was the Michigan Boys Basketball Gatorade Player of the Year, and the runner-up for the Mr. Basketball of Michigan award. He was a 2013–14 Big Ten Conference men's basketball season All-Freshman selection in the Big Ten for the 2013–14 team, which won the Big Ten Conference regular-season championship outright. He was a 2015–16 Big Ten Conference men's basketball season All-Big Ten third-team selection by the coaches, and an honorable mention selection by the media as a junior. He was a 2016–17 Big Ten Conference men's basketball season All-Big Ten second-team selection by the coaches and the media as a senior. Walton is the only Wolverine with 1,000 points, 500 rebounds and 400 assists, and he holds the school's single-game assist record (16). He was the Most Outstanding Player of the 2017 Big Ten Conference men's basketball tournament for the tournament champion 2016–17 Wolverines.

== Early life ==
Walton was born in Detroit, Michigan to Angela and Derrick Walton Sr. on April 3, 1995. Walton had considered attending Saginaw High School with a close friend, Dorian Dawkins, but Dawkins collapsed at a basketball camp on June 12, 2009, due to a heart defect and Walton Sr. became the head coach at Chandler Park Academy. June 13, 2011 was the first day that Michigan offered scholarships to the class of 2013. Walton announced his non-binding verbal commitment to Michigan, on August 1, 2011. He was ranked in the class of 2013: #77 according to Scout.com, #88 according to Rivals.com, and #92 according to ESPN.com. This commitment came one day after Zak Irvin joined Michigan's 2013 recruiting class. Walton had a breakout season as a junior, that included posting 47 points and 12 rebounds against Crockett High School on March 9, 2012, and a quadruple-double against Cesar Chavez Academy on January 31, 2012. Walton's Rivals.com ranking increased from 57th to 44th in the national class of 2013, during the summer of 2012. On November 16, 2012, Michigan men's basketball received a signed National Letter of Intent from the 6-foot (1.83 m) Walton. At Chandler Park Academy, he was the runner-up for the 2013 Mr. Basketball of Michigan award by a 2,130–2,086 margin to Iowa State signee Monté Morris but had one more first-place vote. He was a 2013 Parade All-American honoree and the Michigan Boys Basketball Gatorade Player of the Year. By the end of his high school career, he was ranked 37th by Rivals.

College recruiting
Name	Hometown	School	Height	Weight	Commit date
Derrick Walton; PG	Detroit, MI	Chandler Park Academy (MI)	6 ft 0 in (1.83 m)	172.5 lb (78.2 kg)	Jan 8, 2011
Derrick Walton; PG	Recruit ratings: Scout: Rivals: (89)				
Overall recruit ranking: Scout: 36, 7 (PG) Rivals: 37, 8 (PG) ESPN: 30, 8 (PG), 2 (MI)
Note: In many cases, Scout, Rivals, 247Sports, On3, and ESPN may conflict in their listings of height and weight.; In these cases, the average was taken. ESPN grades are on a 100-point scale.; Sources: "Michigan 2013 Basketball Commitments". Rivals.; "2013 Michigan Basketball Commits". Scout.; "ESPN". ESPN.; "Scout.com Team Recruiting Rankings". Scout.; "2013 Team Ranking". Rivals.

== College career ==
Walton joined a team that had just lost Trey Burke and Tim Hardaway Jr. to the 2013 NBA draft. The 2012–13 Wolverines had reached the championship game of the 2013 NCAA Division I men's basketball tournament, losing to Louisville.

=== Freshman season ===
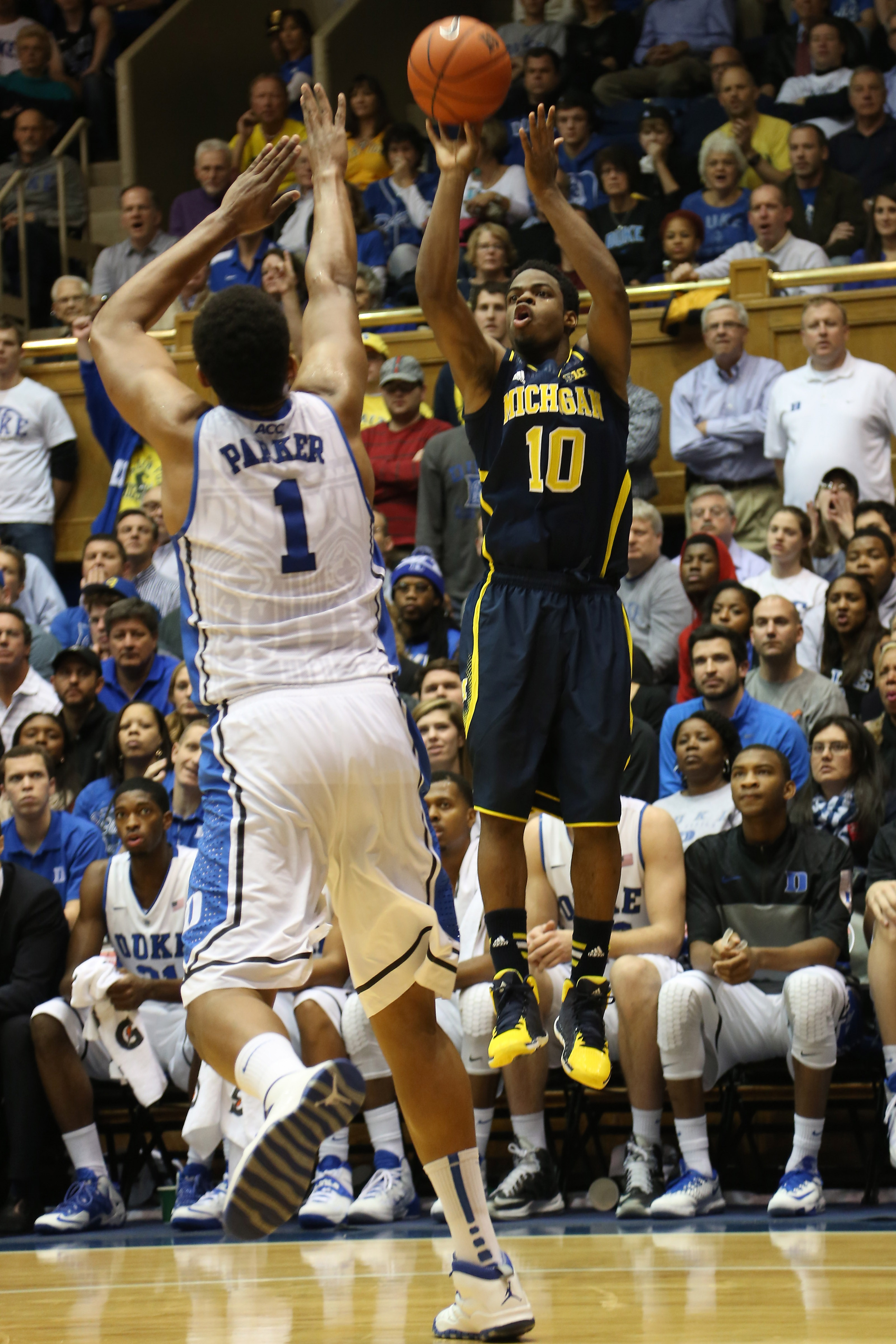
Walton shoots over Jabari Parker of Duke.

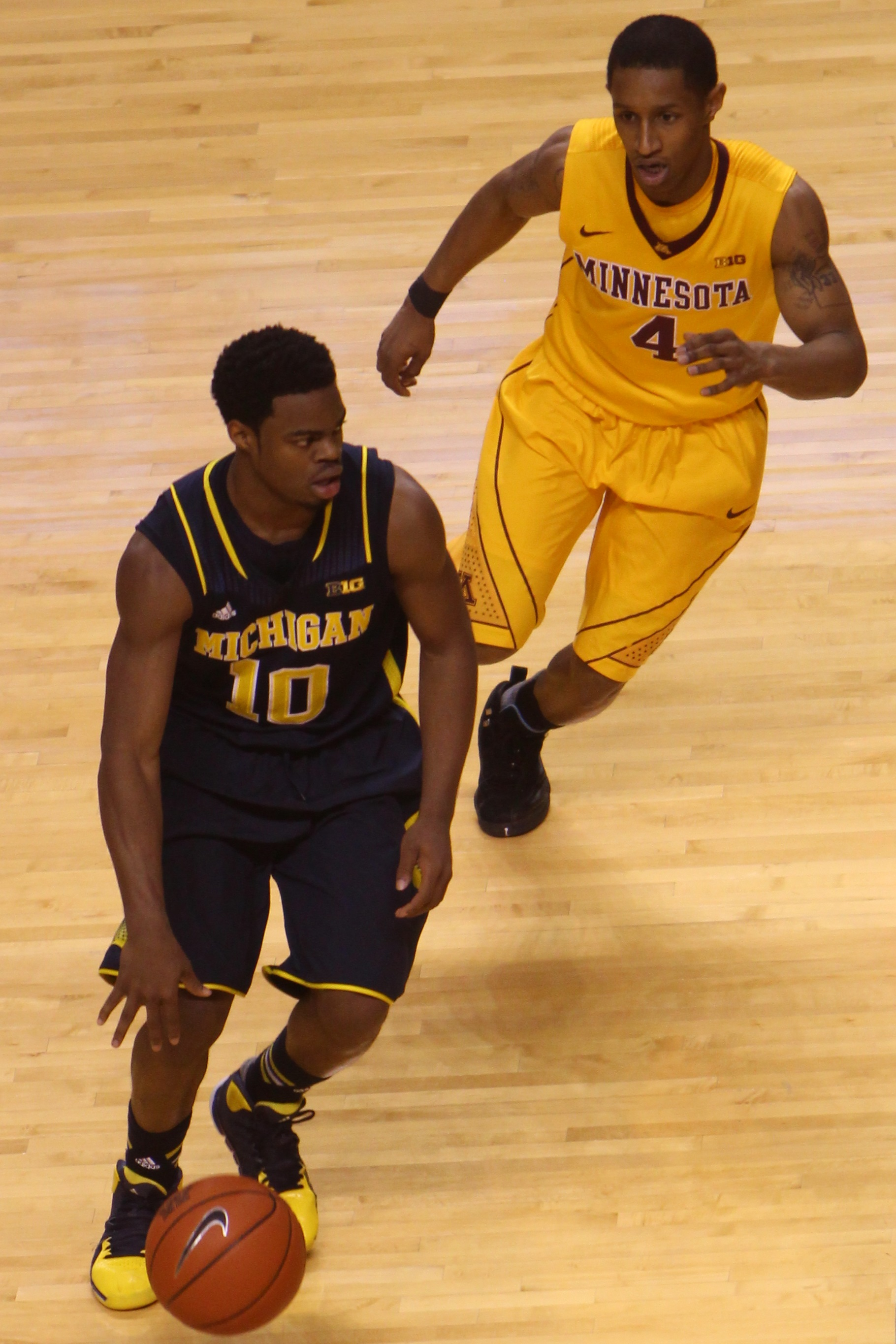
Walton and DeAndre Mathieu in the Michigan–Minnesota 2013–14 Big Ten season opener

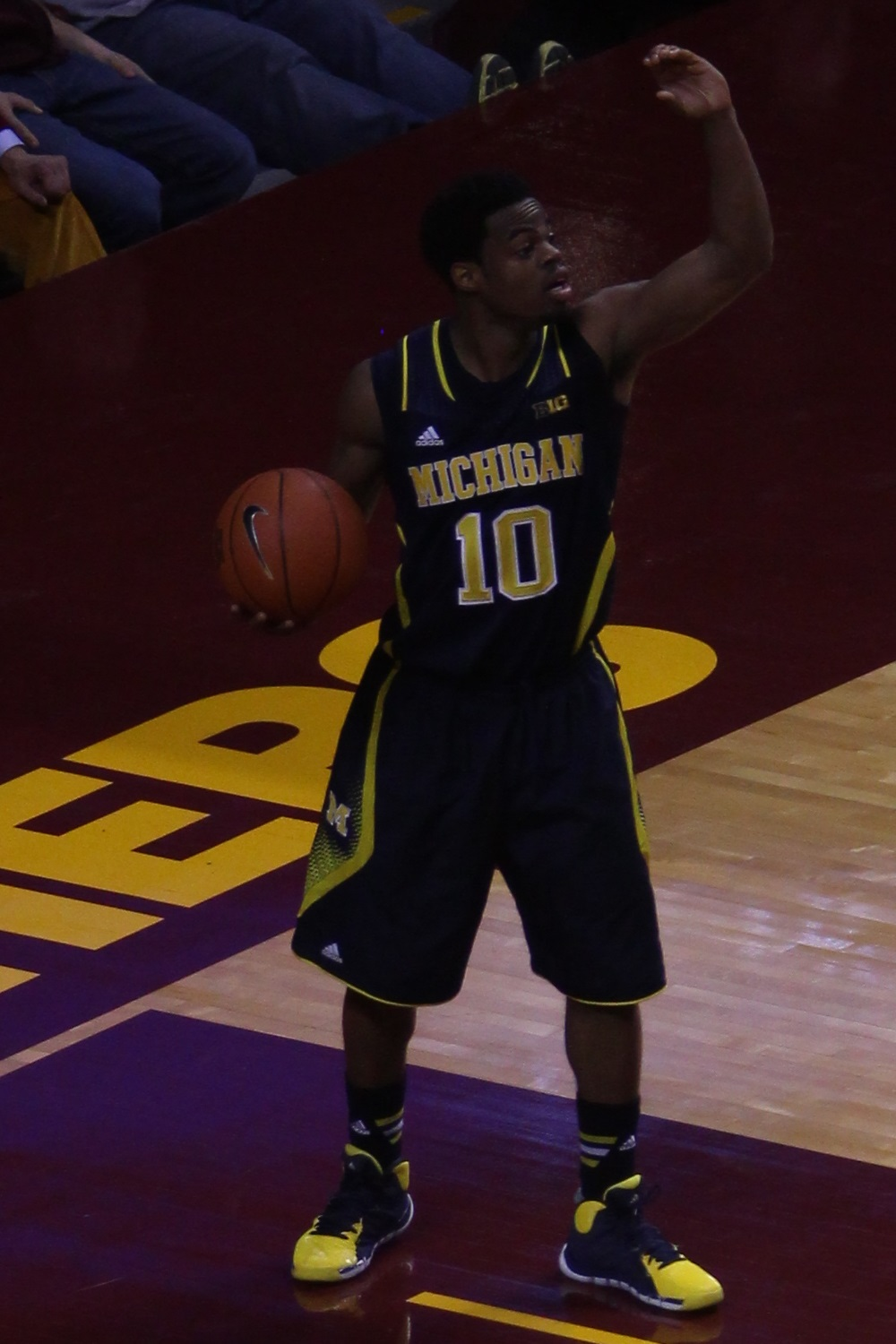
Walton in the Michigan–Minnesota 2013–14 Big Ten season

In September 2013, Sports Illustrated named him the 9th-best freshman. Sporting News named him the 3rd-best Big Ten newcomer. On November 8, the Wolverines opened the season against UMass Lowell. Michigan played six freshmen and Walton started. Michigan played its third game of Walton's freshman season against Monté Morris' Iowa State Cyclones and Walton outscored Morris by a 13–2 margin, but Iowa State won the contest, upsetting the AP Poll #7/Coaches Poll #8 Wolverines 77–70 on November 17. On November 22 against Florida State, Walton contributed 15 points, 6 assists and 4 rebounds to a two-point overtime victory. Walton posted seven assists for the first time on November 29 against Coppin State. On January 9 against Nebraska, Walton contributed key baskets at the end of each half in a one-point victory, giving Michigan its first five-game win streak since the 2013 NCAA tournament. He made a buzzer beater from beyond half court before the half to give Michigan a halftime lead and a layup in Michigan's final possession to take the lead. On January 25 in the Michigan–Michigan State rivalry game, Walton set a new career high with a team-high (tied with Nik Stauskas) 19 points and added 6 rebounds and 4 assists to help Michigan defeat the (#3) Michigan State Spartans 80–75. The victory marked the first time in school history that the team defeated three consecutive AP Poll top ten opponents and marked the first time since the 1986–87 Iowa Hawkeyes that any team had won three consecutive games, all of which were against top ten opponents. It also gave Michigan a 7–0 Big Ten start, which was the best since the 1976–77 team won its first eight games. In the game, Walton went 9-for-10 from the free throw line, including 8-for-9 in the final two and a half minutes. For the week, Walton earned Big Ten Freshman of the Week recognition. On February 11, Walton posted his first double-double with 13 points and 10 rebounds against Ohio State, helping Michigan win at Ohio State for the first time in 11 years. Following the regular season, he was named a Big Ten All-Freshman team selection by the coaches. Michigan clinched its first outright (unshared) Big Ten Conference championship since 1985–86. The 2013–14 team advanced to the Elite Eight round of the 2014 NCAA Division I men's basketball tournament before being eliminated by Kentucky. He posted a career-high four steals in an upset loss against the EMU Eagles.

=== Sophomore season ===
In its preseason top 100 player rankings, ESPN ranked Walton #87. Walton was named along with Big Ten point guards Yogi Ferrell and Melo Trimble to the 36-man Bob Cousy Award Preseason Watch List.

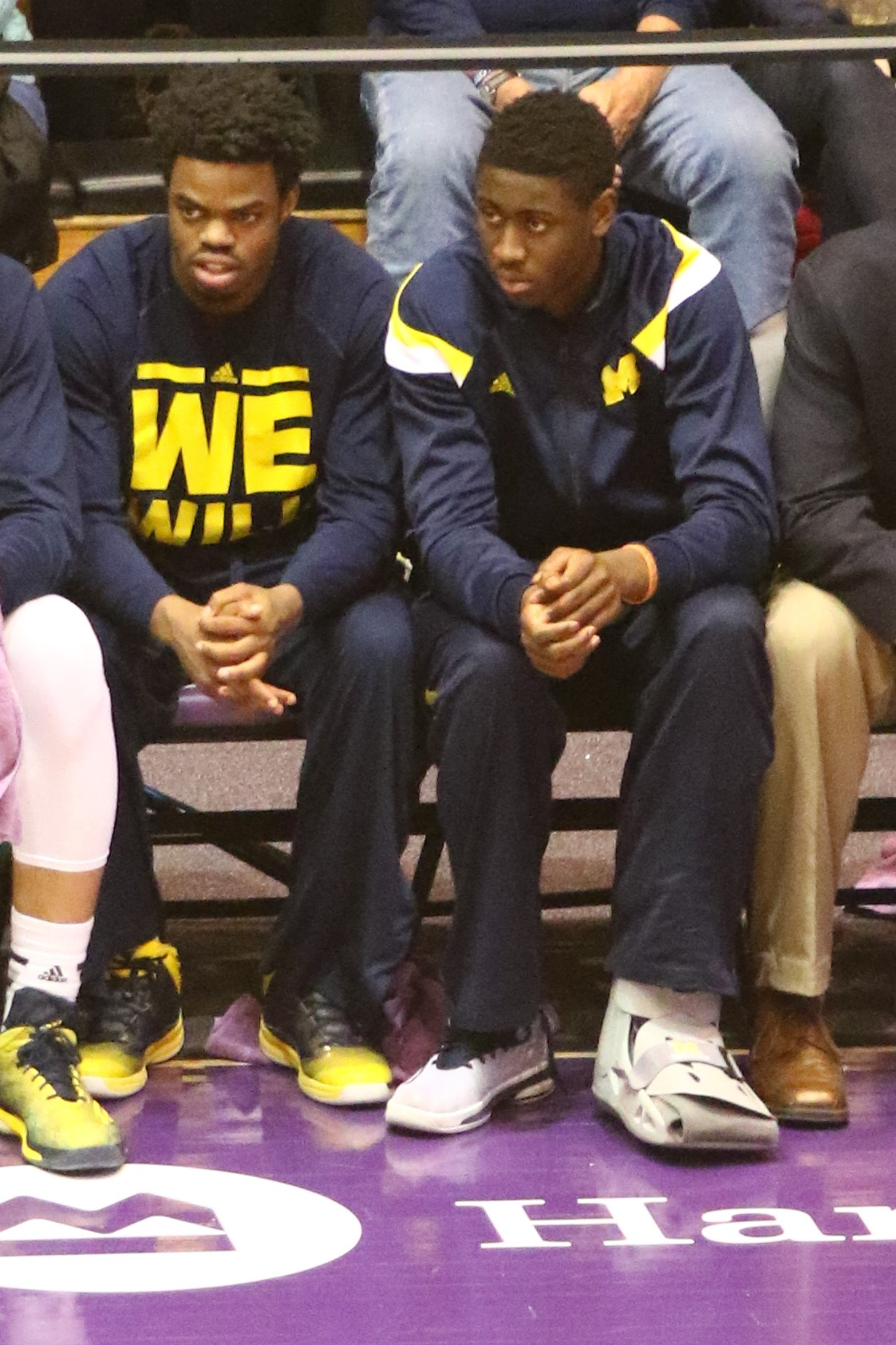
When Walton and Caris LeVert were sidelined for the season in January 2015, the 2014–15 Wolverines began to struggle.

Walton opened the season with a career-high 22 points against Hillsdale College on November 15. On November 29, he was sidelined with an undetermined toe injury against Nicholls State. On December 9, Walton set a career high with 4 steals in a loss against Eastern Michigan. On December 22, Walton posted a career high of 9 assists against Coppin State. In the January 17 win vs. Northwestern, Walton made a career-high four three-point field goals. On January 20 against Rutgers in the first game after Caris LeVert (the team's leader in scoring, rebounding, assists, steals and minutes) was lost for the season, Walton scored a team-high 12 points, including 10 as Michigan rallied from a 42–37 deficit to assume a 52–44 lead with just 32.5 seconds left. The 10 points included two three-pointers that tied the score at 42 and gave Michigan a 45–42 lead and 4 free throws in the final minute. On January 24, Walton scored a team-high 17 points and hit a three-pointer with 1.3 seconds to go against (AP #6/Coaches #5) Wisconsin to tie the game and send it to overtime, but Michigan eventually lost. On January 27, Walton was removed from the lineup prior to the game due to a sore toe as Michigan defeated Nebraska. He then missed the final 12 games of the season due to the toe injury.

=== Junior season ===
After playing only 19 of Michigan's 32 games the prior season for the 2014–15 Wolverines, Walton began the season as a starter against Northern Michigan. On November 16 against Elon, Walton led all players with 24 points, six rebounds and seven assists. His performance included career highs of 24 points, eight field goals (10 attempts) and six three-point shots (seven attempts). Walton sprained his ankle in the first half of the December 1 ACC–Big Ten Challenge victory over NC State. The injury was caused when NC State's Abdul-Malik Abu stepped on Walton's foot. In the subsequent game on December 5 against Houston Baptist, Caris LeVert started in his place at point guard while he sat out. On December 15 against Northern Kentucky, Walton returned from the ankle injury that had sidelined him for three games, and posted 16 points, one rebound, one assist and one steal. On December 19 against Youngstown State, Walton posted 10 points, 11 rebounds and 13 assists, becoming the fifth player in school history to record a triple-double. The rebound and assist totals were career highs. On January 12 with leading scorer Caris LeVert sidelined, Michigan defeated (#3/#3) Maryland 70–67 as Walton had a 12-point/10-rebound double-double. On January 23, Walton's 19-point, 12-rebound double-double helped Michigan defeat Nebraska 81–68, and his 13-point, 10-rebound double-double on January 30 against Penn State helped lead Michigan to victory in the inaugural B1G Super Saturday game at Madison Square Garden. On February 10, Michigan defeated Minnesota behind a career-high 26 points by Walton. Following the 2015–16 Big Ten season, he was listed as a third-team All-Big Ten selection by the coaches and an honorable mention All-Big Ten selection by the media. On March 11, during the quarterfinals of the 2016 Big Ten Conference men's basketball tournament against Indiana, Walton set a Big Ten tournament single-game record with 12 assists. The record lasted 5 years until Mike Smith posted 15 for the Wolverines in the 2021 Big Ten men's basketball tournament. Walton finished the Big Ten tournament with 22 assists over the course of the tournament, tying him for third on the all-time single tournament list with Brent Darby (2003), until Denzel Valentine went on to total 28 assists for the tournament the next day. On March 18, Michigan lost to No. 6 seed Notre Dame in the 2016 NCAA Division I men's basketball tournament, 63–70. Walton recorded a career-high six steals, along with ten points, eight assists and four rebounds. Six steals broke a Michigan single-NCAA tournament game record shared by Mitch McGary (2013), Rickey Green (1977) and Tom Stanton (1977).

=== Senior season ===
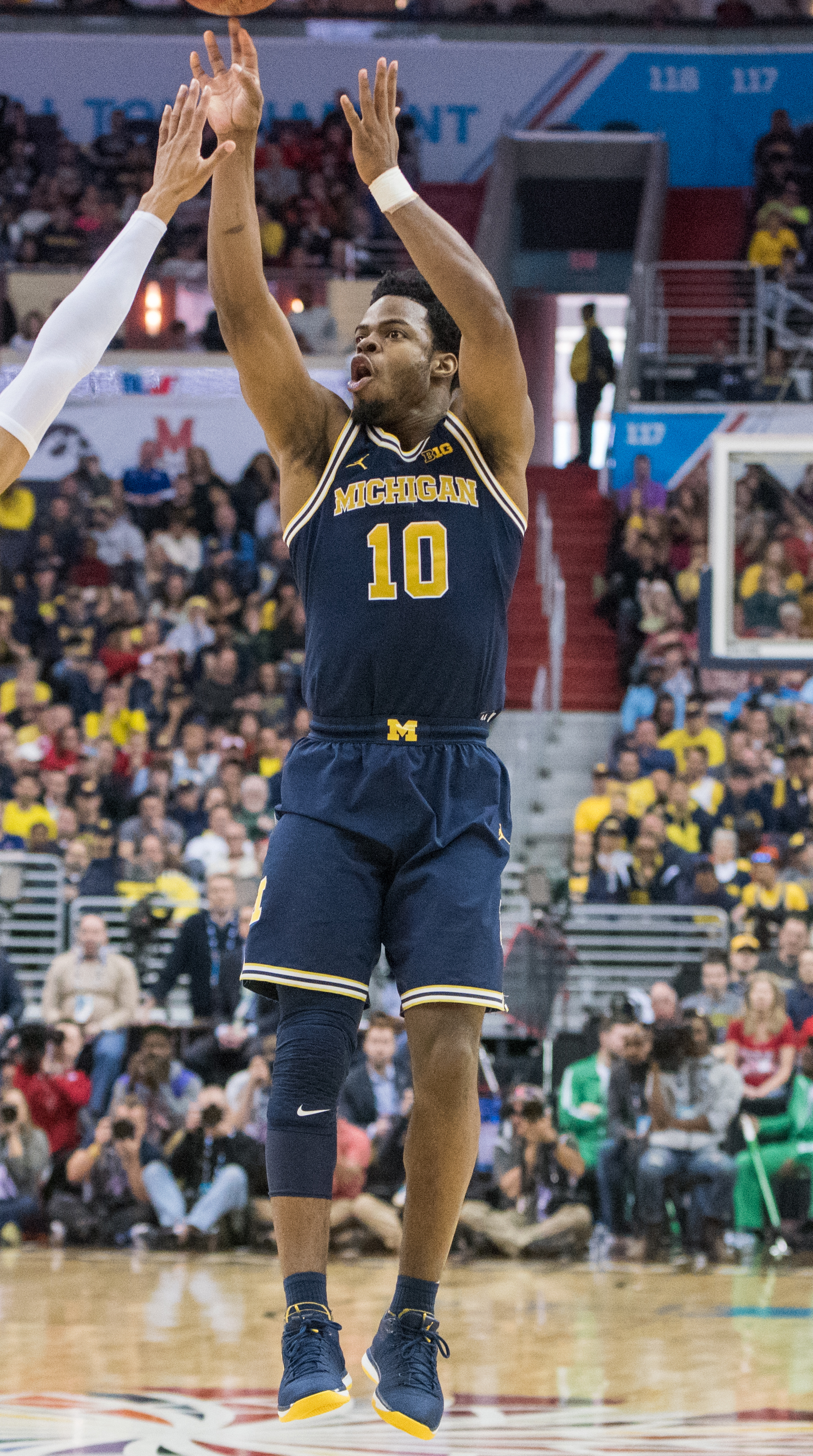
Walton in 2017

Walton entered the season as one of ten Preseason All-Big Ten honorees. He served as a co-captain with Zak Irvin. In the championship game of the 2016 2K Sports Classic held at Madison Square Garden on November 18, Walton made a career-high seven three-point shots and scored 23 points as Michigan defeated SMU 76–54. On December 10 against (#2/#2) UCLA, Walton posted nine points, becoming the 51st Wolverine in program history to eclipse 1,000 career points. On January 6, 2017, Walton was one of five Big Ten players included on the 30-man Senior CLASS Award candidate list. On February 7 against Michigan State, Walton posted 20 points, 8 assists and 5 rebounds, becoming the third player in program history to eclipse 1,000 points, 400 rebounds and 400 assists, joining Gary Grant and Jalen Rose. On February 12, Walton led Michigan to its first road win with 25 points against Indiana, marking his fifth consecutive 20-point game. After averaging 22.5 points, 6.0 assists, 5.0 rebounds and 2.5 steals and shooting a 60.9% (14-for-23) field goal percentage, an 83.3% (5-for-6) three-point percentage and a perfect 12-for-12 on his free throws, Walton earned Co-Big Ten Player of the Week honors (along with Jordan Murphy) on February 13. On February 16 against (#11/#10) Wisconsin, Walton posted 5 points, 5 rebounds, and 8 assists, becoming the first player in program history to eclipse 1,000 points, 500 rebounds and 400 assists. On March 5, Walton posted 18 points, 5 steals, and set the Michigan single-game assists record with 16 against Nebraska in the final regular-season game of his senior year, surpassing Grant who had twice totalled 14. Walton earned another Co-Big Ten Player of the Week honor (along with Caleb Swanigan) on March 6. Walton was recognized by both the coaches and the media as a second-team All-Big Ten selection. Walton was one of ten Big Ten players honored as All-District selections by the United States Basketball Writers Association.

Prior to the 2017 Big Ten Conference men's basketball tournament, Walton incurred stitches in his right leg for injuries sustained in an airplane accident on the way to the tournament. In the March 11 semifinal of the Big Ten tournament against Minnesota, Walton posted a career-high 29 points including a perfect 10-for-10 on his free throws as well as a game-high 9 assists to lead Michigan to an 84–77 victory. It was only the fourth time someone had made at least 10 free throws without a miss in a Big Ten tournament game. In the championship game 71–56 victory over (#23/#24) Wisconsin, Walton posted 22 points for eighth-seeded Michigan. During the Big Ten tournament, Walton averaged 20.5 points, 6.3 assists, 4.8 rebounds and 1.8 steals while shooting 22-for-23 from the free throw line. After the tournament, he was named Big Ten tournament Most Outstanding Player.

In the first round of the 2017 NCAA Division I men's basketball tournament, Walton posted 26 points and 11 assists in a 92–91 victory over Oklahoma State. It marked the first time a player had had either at least 11 assists and 24 points or at least 25 points, 10 assists and 5 rebounds in an NCAA Division I tournament game since Dwyane Wade in 2003. The team reached the sweet sixteen round of the tournament. Walton was included on the National Association of Basketball Coaches Division I All‐District 7 second-team on March 22. His 98 three-point shots made led the Big Ten Conference. Walton finished second in minutes played (34.8), free throw percentage (87.6%) and assists/turnover ratio (2.9) in the Big Ten for the season. He finished his career second in career free throw percentage (83.67%), third in career games started (126) fourth in career assists (499) and fourth in career three-point field goals made (233) in school history. He was selected to participate as a 3-Point Championship contestant in the March 30 State Farm College Slam Dunk & 3-Point Championships as part of the 2017 NCAA Division I men's basketball tournament Final Four weekend. Walton finished third out of eight. Following the season, Walton was named team MVP. On April 30, 2017, Jeff Goodman of ESPN reported that he was named as an alternate to the NBA Draft Combine. Ultimately, Walton was invited to attend the combine.

== Professional career ==
=== Miami Heat (2017–2018) ===
Following the season, Walton went undrafted in the 2017 NBA draft and signed to play with the Orlando Magic for the 2017 NBA Summer League. Walton had an impressive summer league performance. He averaged 10.0 points, 3.5 assists, 2.5 rebounds and 20.5 minutes in four games while shooting 46.9% (15-of-32) field goal percentage and 50% (6-of-12) on three-point shots. On July 24, 2017, Walton signed a two-way contract with the Miami Heat, meaning he would split his playing time between the Heat and their G League affiliate, the Sioux Falls Skyforce. On October 23, Walton was assigned to the Skyforce with the expectation that he would spend most of the season in the G League. He did not play when the Skyforce opened their season on November 4 because he left the team in advance of the game.

With Dion Waiters absent and Rodney McGruder sidelined, Walton was active on November 6 against the Golden State Warriors, when he made his NBA debut, posting one defensive rebound in one minute of play. Walton converted 2 free throws on November 19 against the Indiana Pacers, and he posted his first NBA field goal (a three-point shot) on December 18 against the Atlanta Hawks.

On January 5, 2018, Walton was sidelined with an illness. Over the course of the season, Walton appeared in 16 games with the Heat.

In late June 2018, the Heat made Walton a restricted free agent by extended Walton a qualifying offer that they could withdraw at any point up to July 13.

=== Žalgiris Kaunas (2018–2019) ===
On August 12, 2018, Walton signed with the Chicago Bulls. He was waived by the Bulls on October 12.

On October 18, Žalgiris Kaunas announced that they signed a contract with Walton until the end of the 2018–19 season. On February 12, 2019, Walton, whose playing time had started declining since December, left Žalgiris by terminating his deal with mutual agreement. He averaged 8.4 points and 4.4 assists in the LKL, and 4.6 points and 2.5 assists in the Euroleague.

=== Alba Berlin (2019) ===
Walton joined Alba Berlin in mid-February 2019. He helped Alba reach the Basketball Bundesliga finals.

=== Los Angeles Clippers (2019–2020) ===
Walton joined the Los Angeles Clippers for the 2019 NBA Summer League. After the Summer League ended, Walton signed an Exhibit 10 contract with the team. Walton made the opening day 15-man roster. Walton was assigned to the Agua Caliente Clippers for the start of the G League season. He made key late free throws to seal wins for Agua Caliente in their first two games of the season. He was assigned multiple times to Agua Caliente between November 7, 2019, and January 29, 2020.

Walton remained deep on the Clippers bench early in the season as the team used Jerome Robinson and Terance Mann in the backup point guard role. On December 8, with JaMychal Green hobbled and Patrick Patterson, Rodney McGruder and Landry Shamet sidelined Walton played his first meaningful minutes, posting a career-high 7 points and contributing to a win against the Washington Wizards. On December 31 (New Year's Eve), he posted his first double-digit scoring effort (10 points on 4-of-5 shooting) against the Sacramento Kings. On January 4, 2020, with Paul George joining Patrick Beverley on the sidelines, Walton made his first NBA start against the Memphis Grizzlies.

On February 6, 2020, Walton was traded to the Atlanta Hawks in exchange for a protected 2022 second-round draft pick. He was waived immediately by the Hawks.

=== Detroit Pistons (2020) ===
On February 21, 2020, Walton joined his hometown team, the Detroit Pistons, on a 10-day contract. He was not re-signed to a second 10-day contract.

=== ASVEL (2020–2021) ===
After spending pre-season with the Philadelphia 76ers, Walton moved to France in December 2020 to play for ASVEL until the end of the 2020–21 Pro A season.

=== Detroit Pistons / Motor City Cruise (2021–2022) ===
On September 28, 2021, Walton signed with the Detroit Pistons. He was released by the Pistons the following month and he subsequently joined the Motor City Cruise of the NBA G League. Walton averaged 13.8 points, 7.8 assists and 4.8 rebounds per game.

On December 25, 2021, Walton signed a 10-day contract with the Pistons. On January 1, 2022, he delivered a game-winning assist in overtime against the San Antonio Spurs that went between the defender's (Jakob Pöltl) legs to Saddiq Bey. During the game he posted six assists as well as NBA career highs in points (11), rebounds (6) and steals (4).

On January 4, 2022, Walton returned to the Motor City Cruise for the rest of the season. On January 5, he posted his first G League triple-double as well as the first in the history of the Motor City Cruise franchise with 20 points, 11 rebounds and a G League career-high 16 assists. Walton led the G League in assists for the 2021–22 season with a 9.5-assist-per-game average.

=== Sydney Kings (2022–2023) ===
On July 5, 2022, Walton signed with the Sydney Kings in Australia for the 2022–23 NBL season. On December 18, 2022, he scored 45 points in a 113–112 double-overtime loss to the South East Melbourne Phoenix. In March 2023, he helped the Kings win the NBL championship with a 3–2 Championship Series victory over the New Zealand Breakers. He was subsequently named the Championship Series MVP.

=== Zhejiang Lions (2023–2024) ===
Walton joined the Zhejiang Lions of the Chinese Basketball Association for the 2023–24 season and averaged 12.6 points and 5.1 assists per game in 42 appearances.

=== South East Melbourne Phoenix (2024–2025) ===
On May 3, 2024, Walton signed with the South East Melbourne Phoenix for the 2024–25 NBL season. On October 22, 2024, he was ruled out for three weeks with a hamstring injury. On January 14, 2025, he was ruled out for the rest of the regular season after suffering another hamstring injury three days earlier in a game against the Brisbane Bullets. After missing eight games, he was confirmed to be returning for the Phoenix's semi-finals series against the Illawarra Hawks.

=== Hapoel Holon (2025–2026) ===
In September 2025, Walton signed with Hapoel Holon B.C. of the Israeli Basketball Premier League.

=== Capitanes de Arecibo (2026) ===
In February 2026, Walton signed with Capitanes de Arecibo of the Baloncesto Superior Nacional (BSN).

== NBA career statistics ==
Legend
GP	Games played	GS	Games started	MPG	Minutes per game
FG%	Field goal percentage	3P%	3-point field goal percentage	FT%	Free throw percentage
RPG	Rebounds per game	APG	Assists per game	SPG	Steals per game
BPG	Blocks per game	PPG	Points per game	**Bold**	Career high

=== Regular season ===
Year	Team	GP	GS	MPG	FG%	3P%	FT%	RPG	APG	SPG	BPG	PPG
2017–18	Miami	16	0	9.2	.320	.412	**1.000**	1.0	1.0	.4	.2	1.8
2019–20	L.A. Clippers	**23**	**1**	9.7	**.472**	**.429**	.778	.7	1.0	.2	.0	2.2
2019–20	Detroit	3	0	8.8	.333	.333	.0	.3	1.7	1.0	.0	1.0
2021–22	Detroit	3	**3**	**36.0**	.231	.231	**1.000**	**3.3**	**7.0**	**2.3**	**1.3**	**6.3**
Career		45	4	9.4	.406	.415	.867	.8	1.0	.3	.1	2.0

== See also ==
- Michigan Wolverines men's basketball statistical leaders
