= El-Hajj Malik El-Shabazz Academy =

Charter school in Lansing, Michigan

Coordinates: 42°42′55″N 84°34′0″W

El-Hajj Malik El-Shabazz Academy, also known as Shabazz Public School Academy, was a charter elementary school in Lansing, Michigan. Its namesake was Malcolm X.

== History ==
People who were a part of the group Parent Support Network argued that the Lansing School District facilities had not adequately served black children, and they used that as the reason to create the Shabazz School. Additionally, the small charter schools attracted parents who wanted more of a say in their child's school.

Shabazz was established in 1995. It initially was in an ex-ice cream shop, and later it occupied what was previously Pleasant Grove Elementary School. Its initial enrollment was 150, and that was below the number of students who had applied to attend the school. Central Michigan University was the authorizer of the school's charter.

In 2019 the university stated that the school was in the lowest 5% performance bracket in the state and that the university would not continue to authorize the school. The school closed that year. In 2020 a court forced the board of education of the school to begin the process of selling the building.

== Curriculum ==
The school used an Afrocentric curriculum.

== Operations ==
The school used a traditional style of school uniform. Mark Mayes of the Lansing State Journal stated that Shabazz was more like a traditional American school, compared to Sankofa Shule.

== See also ==
- List of public school academy districts in Michigan
