= Chandler Park Academy =

Public charter school in Michigan, United States

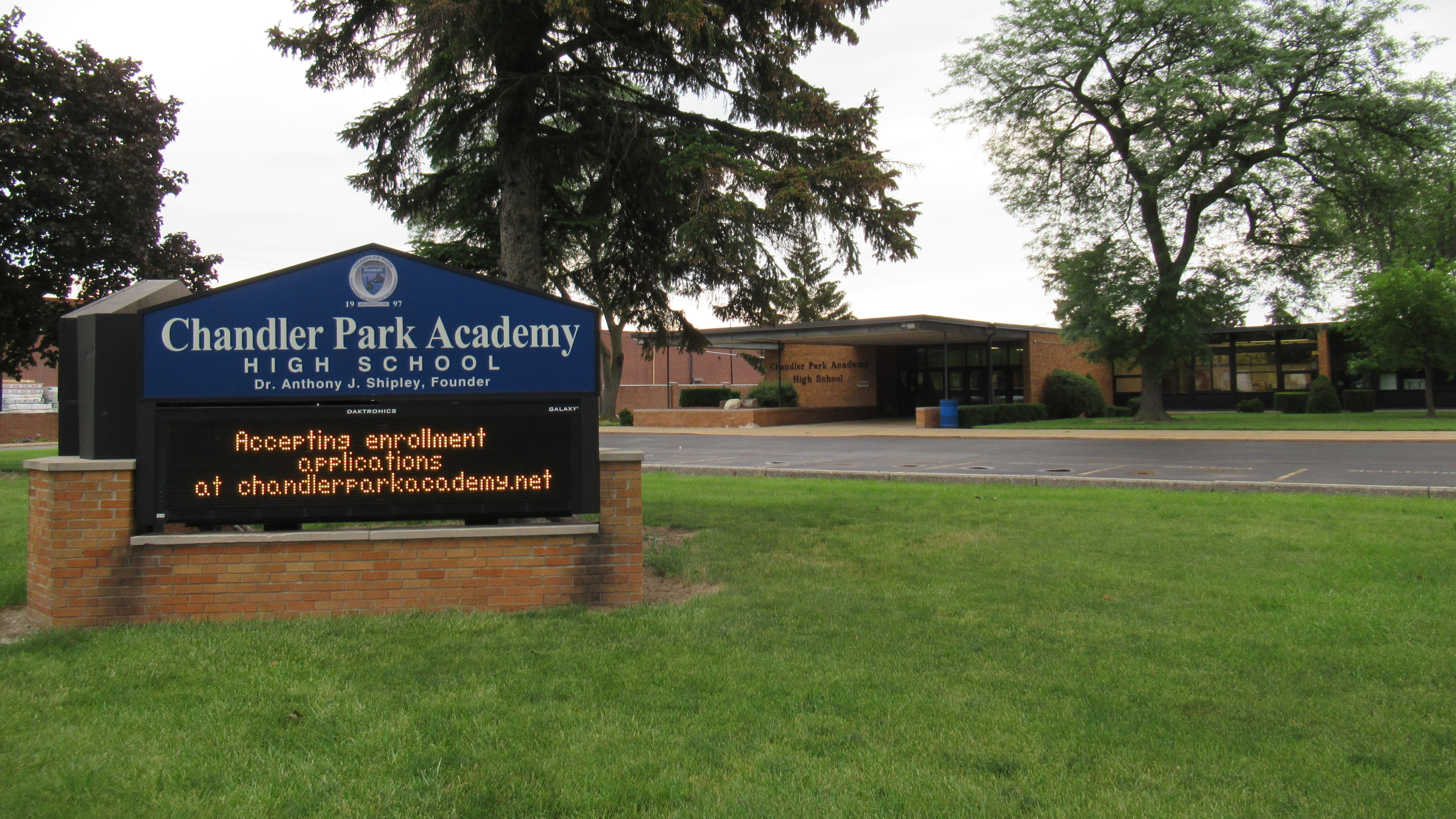
- Chandler Park Academy High School

Location
- Harper Woods, Michigan 48225; United States; 42.44504°N 82.94312°W

Information
- Type: Public charter
- Established: 1997
- Grades: preK–12
- Enrolment: 2,336 (2020–2021)
- Campus size: 43 acres (17.4 ha)
- Campus type: Suburban
- Colors: Navy and White
- Nickname: Eagles
- Website: Official website

Chandler Park Academy is a K–12 college preparatory elementary, middle, and charter high school in Harper Woods, Michigan, United States, that was established in Detroit in 1997.

The student body is 98.89% African American and 80% of students qualify for free/reduced price lunch. The student/teacher ratio is 25:1.

Chandler Park Academy rates lower than most nearby public schools based on test scores according to greatschools.net, although their fall 2006 MEAP and National Merit scores were higher than the State of Michigan targets.

In December 2024, the school benefited from a $1,500 contribution from Atlanta Life Insurance Group and Shipley Foundation.

== Founding ==
Chandler Park Academy was founded by the late Reverend Anthony Shipley at Christ United Methodist Church where he was a minister. "Chandler Park" is a park that was near this original location.

Drawing on his background in educational program development, Dr. Shipley developed a plan focused on creating structured, scalable, and learner-centered frameworks that improve educational delivery and outcomes. Motivated by his experience and dedication to education, he began implementing this concept in 1997 with assistance from the congregation of Christ United Methodist Church. During this process, the church facility was prepared to satisfy necessary standards, and a charter was obtained through Saginaw Valley State University with the help of co-applicant John Romine.

Chandler Park Academy later became a central part of the educational model associated with Shipley’s efforts.

== Notable alumni ==
- Derrick Walton (2013), professional basketball player

== See also ==
- List of public school academy districts in Michigan
