= Universal Learning Academy =

Location
- 28015 Joy Road; Westland, Michigan 48185; United States
- Coordinates: 42°21′17″N 83°19′06″W

Information
- Type: Charter school
- Established: 2004
- Founder: Nawal Hamadeh
- Authority: Bay Mills Community College
- Superintendent: Nawal Hamadeh
- President: Hassan Alaouie
- Principal: Layal Boussi
- Teaching staff: 41.14 (on a FTE basis)
- Grades: K-12
- Enrollment: 702 (2014-2015)
- Student to teacher ratio: 17.06
- Website: www.ulapsa.org

Universal Learning Academy is a charter school in Westland, Michigan, in the Detroit metropolitan area, serving grades Kindergarten through 12.

== History ==
It was established in 2004 by Hamadeh Educational Services, a company created by Lebanese American woman Nawal Hamadeh.

Previously the school had a main campus and a kindergarten campus, both in Dearborn Heights. The current campus for all grade levels, in Westland, opened on November 18, 2011.

== Academics ==
Universal Learning Academy offers instruction in Arabic to students in grades K-5.

== Demographics ==
According to the National Center for Education Statistics, the enrollment for the 2014–2015 school year was 702 students in kindergarten through twelfth grade. 51.0% were male and 49.0% were female. Native Americans and Alaskans made up 0.1% of the enrollment; Asians and Pacific islanders 1.3%; blacks 9.5%; Hispanics of all racial makeup 1.9%; whites 85.3%. Students claiming a multi-racial background made up 1.9% of the enrollment. 84.6% of the student body were eligible for free or reduced lunch. This is a Title I school.

Nada Saab, Arabic Language Department Director of Hamadeh Educational Services, stated in a letter to the editor published in The Language Educator in 2007 that "over 90% of its students come from Middle Eastern and/or Arabic [sic] background."

== Athletics ==
The Universal Learning Academy Blue Jays participate in three Michigan High School Athletic Association sanctioned sports - soccer for boys, volleyball for girls and basketball for both boys and girls. The school colors are blue, gold and white. Universal Learning Academy is not affiliated with a conference.
