= Sankofa Shule =

Charter school in Lansing, Michigan, USA

Sankofa Shule was a charter school in Lansing, Michigan.

The school's name is a mix of Akan and Swahili words.

== History ==
It was established in 1995. Its original enrollment was 116. For a period it occupied a building that also had a beauty school. The charter school's authorizer was Central Michigan University.

By 2002 CMU and the school were involved in a conflict over finances.

In 2007 CMU stopped renewing the charter, and the school closed.

== Operations ==
The school used "Baba" and "Mama", from Swahili, as ways to address male and female teachers, and it used variations of the buba as its school uniform. The school featured prominent African-Americans in its decorations.

Students were placed in classes organized by ability instead of traditional grade level classes.

The physical education curricula included dance styles from the African continent.

“Sankofa Shule … produced low-income African American students who could read two to four levels above grade level, who did algebra and calculus in grade school and who out scored the Lansing School District and the state of Michigan on state the accountability test (MEAP) in 2000 in mathematics and in writing. The school was called ‘an educational powerhouse’ by U.S. News & World Report in the April 27, 1998 issue.” Lisa Delpit, Multiplication is for white people raising expectations for other people’s children, 2012

== Curriculum ==
The school used an Afrocentric curriculum. The school had foreign language classes for Swahili, French, Japanese, and Spanish.

== See also ==
- El-Hajj Malik El-Shabazz Academy – Afrocentric charter school in Lansing established in 1995 and closed in 2019
- List of public school academy districts in Michigan
