= Macomb Intermediate School District =

School district in Michigan

Address
- 44001 Garfield Road Clinton Township, Michigan, 48038; United States
- Coordinates: 42°37′10.1″N 82°57′14.9″W

District information
- Type: Public
- Grades: PreK–12
- NCES District ID: 2680720

Students and staff
- Students: 2,587
- Teachers: 228.1 (FTE)
- Staff: 879.5 (FTE)
- Student–teacher ratio: 11.34

Other information
- Website: www.misd.net

Macomb Intermediate School District (MISD) is a coordinating school district based in Clinton Township, Michigan. The district serves local school districts in Macomb County, primarily through the providing of special education support, services and screening of students. The MISD operates several schools of its own to educate more seriously disabled children.
