= Pathways Academy =

Location
- 11340 E. Jefferson Avenue; Detroit. Michigan; United States
- 42.3669°N 82.9707°W

Information
- Principal: Michelle Parham
- Grades: 7-12

Pathways Academy is a charter school in Detroit, Michigan for students who are pregnant or new mothers. It is operated by Innovative Educational Programs, a company based in Basking Ridge, New Jersey.

Pathways Academy opened after Catherine Ferguson Academy, another Detroit school serving students who are pregnant or new mothers, closed.

In 2018, Pathways Academy was identified by the Michigan Department of Education as a low-performing school.
