= Bay Mills Community College =

Tribal land-grant community college in Brimley, Michigan, U.S.

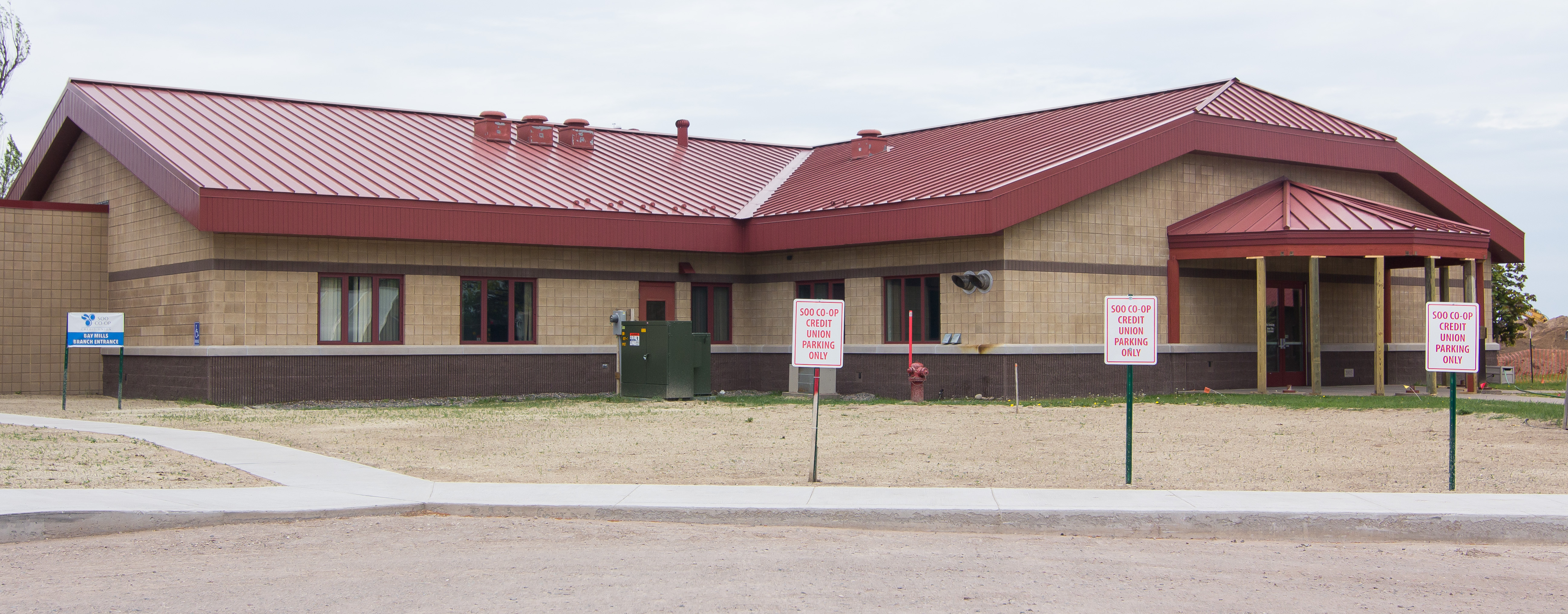
- Type: Public tribal land-grant community college
- Established: 1981
- Affiliations: American Indian Higher Education Consortium
- President: Duane A. Bedell
- Students: 531
- Location: Brimley, Michigan, United States; 46.4548°N 84.6063°W
- Website: www.bmcc.edu

Bay Mills Community College (BMCC) is a public tribal land-grant community college in Brimley, Michigan. It is chartered by the federally recognized Bay Mills Indian Community of Michigan with a total enrollment of approximately 500 on-campus and online students. The students come primarily from Michigan's eastern Upper Peninsula and are 60% Native American. BMCC is a member of the American Indian Higher Education Consortium (AIHEC), a community of tribally and federally chartered institutions working to strengthen tribal nations, and a land-grant college.

BMCC was created in response to the higher education needs of American Indians. BMCC generally serves geographically isolated populations that have no other means accessing education beyond the high school level. It provides online classes to a community beyond its geographic area. BMCC offers free tuition to U.S. Federally recognized Tribal Members. BMCC also authorizes charter schools in the state of Michigan.

== History ==
BMCC is Michigan's first accredited Tribal College located on a reservation. It was designated as a land grant institution by the Equity in Educational Land Grant Status Act of 1994. Its educational programs support the Anishinaabek Community, as well as the Sault Ste. Marie bands of the Ojibwe. The college began as a vocational program in response to the economic development needs of the seven Native American communities which were initially served. The program was funded in 1981 by the Department of Education. In 1984 the college was chartered by the Bay Mills Indian Community under the Tribal colleges and universities provisions of the Higher Education Act of 1965. It is a nonprofit educational corporation and has been declared 501 (c)(3) tax-exempt by the IRS. Since its establishment in 1981 with an enrollment of eleven students, the college has grown to currently serve over seven hundred students annually through on-campus, off-campus, and online programming. In 1994, the college was designated a land-grant college alongside 31 other tribal colleges. In 1994, the college was designated a land-grant college alongside 31 other tribal colleges.

Control of BMCC is vested in a Board of Regents, which selects the president and establishes overall institutional policy. Although the college specializes in programs for American Indians, who represent approximately 60% of the annual student enrollment, its doors are open to all people who want to benefit from the educational process. BMCC is dedicated to providing academic and personal enrichment programs to Native Americans and residents of their neighboring communities. BMCC uses its technological infrastructure to reach beyond the physical borders of Michigan, offering online instruction throughout North America.

== Images ==
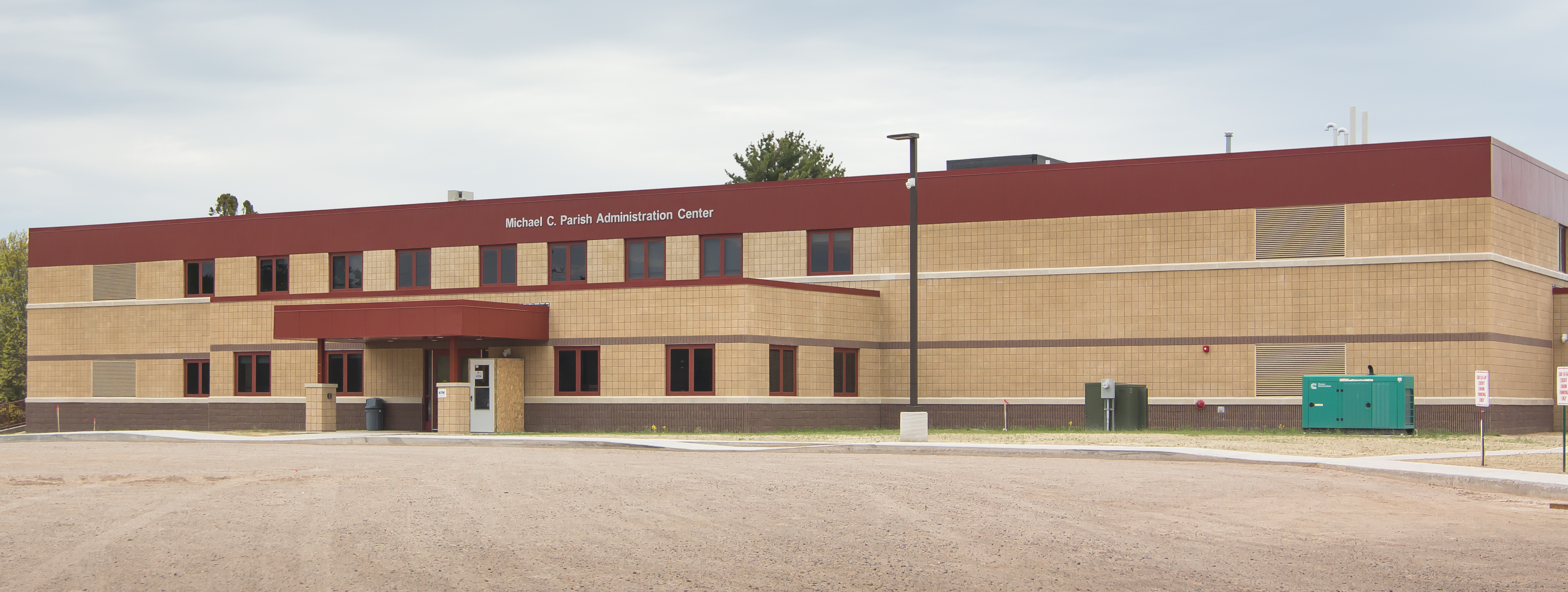
Michael Parish Administration Center

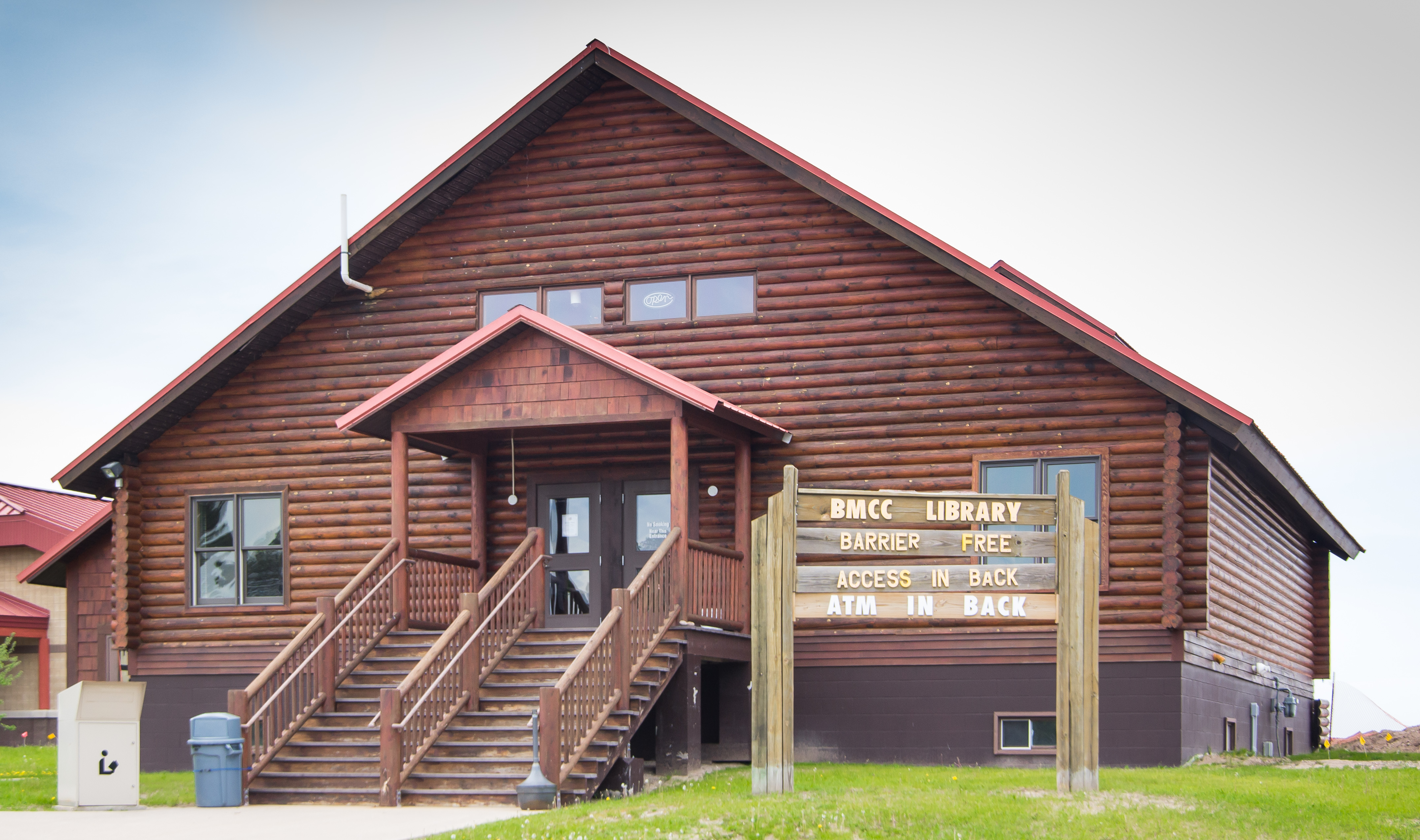
Bay Mills Community College Library

== Academics ==
BMCC offers associate degrees, certificates, and diploma programs. It also offers an online bachelor's degree in Early Childhood Education.

== Partners ==
BMCC participates in the Michigan Association of Collegiate Registrars and Admission Officers Articulation Agreement (MACRAO) which provides BMCC students a transfer process of general education credits between public and private community colleges and universities in Michigan.
