= Catherine Ferguson (educator) =

American Sunday school teacher

Catherine "Katy" Ferguson
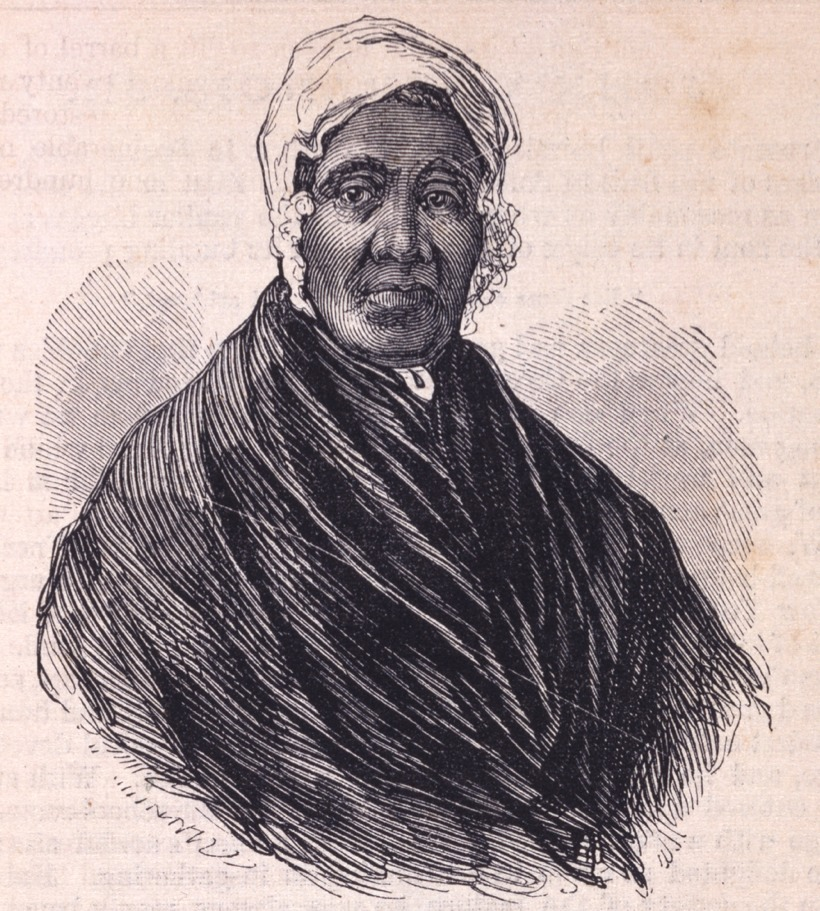
- Born: c. 1779
- Died: July 11, 1854
- Known for: founding the first documented Sunday school in the United States; caring for neglected children

Catherine Ferguson (c. 1779 – July 11, 1854) was an African-American philanthropist and educator who founded the first Sunday school in New York City.

== Early life ==
Ferguson was born into slavery in about 1779, while her mother, Katy Williams, was being transported from Virginia to New York City. After her mother was sold as a slave when Catherine was eight years old, she never had the chance to see her again. Ferguson referred to their master, a Presbyterian elder, only by the initials "R. B.", in order "to conceal his identity" and to prevent embarrassment from his own family. Her separation from her mother became her inspiration for helping children later in her life.

At the age of fourteen, Catherine became the first congregant of color at the Scotch Presbyterian Church under the leadership of Reverend Dr. John Mitchell Mason, who had just accepted the pastoral charge of the church after the death of his father. Catherine was tremblingly apprehensive for her master's family to know that she was in attendance at his church or that she sought to speak to him, however she summoned resolution enough to go. In the only known interview in her own words, given to American abolitionist Lewis Tappan and published in the August 1854 edition of American Missionary after her death, Catherine stated that she rang his doorbell in fear and when he opened it, she was trembling from head to toe, worried that he would send her away or speak to her harshly. Dr. Mason did no such thing and instead asked her, "Have you come here to talk to me about your soul?" Feeling greatly encouraged, Catherine entered his home and "disclosed to the venerable man the secrets of her heart".

At about the age of sixteen or seventeen, Isabella Graham purchased Ferguson her freedom for US$200, an amount that she had to repay over a period of six years. But the original agreement was changed later: instead of repayment of the sum, an arrangement was made between Graham and Ferguson that the latter would work for Graham as a "lady of the city" for eleven months, which became the equivalent of US$100. The remaining half was raised by Divie Bethune, Isabella's son-in-law, a New York merchant who was also a member of the same congregation. Afterwards, Ferguson became a baker of cakes sold for "weddings and parties".

Ferguson married at the age of eighteen. She bore two children who both died during their infancy, as did her husband around the same time. She died of cholera at her home in 1854, at about 75 years of age.

== As an educator ==
She believed that every child should be educated and safe. Although illiterate, Ferguson took care of poor and neglected black and white children in her neighborhood. Every Sunday, she brought these children to her home on Warren Street, New York, in order to provide them with religious education. From her house, and through the encouragement of a local minister, Rev. Dr. John Mitchell Mason of the Associate Reformed Church, her Sunday School was moved to the basement of a church - where there was a lecture room - on Murray Street in about 1814. Because of her illiteracy, Ferguson was unable to write about her experiences in early America, thus being seldom mentioned by historians, but she was described to have responded to "the needs of the poor in an era which the poor were notably neglected". Later on, her school became known as the Murray Street Sabbath School. Catherine's school has been named as the first documented Sunday school in the United States. Ferguson's teaching instructions included the memorization of hymns and Scripture. Among Ferguson's visitors to the school were Isabella Graham and Reverend Isaac Ferris.

Apart from her efforts in educating children, Ferguson also held prayer meetings for children and adults twice a week, a work that went on for more than 40 years. She also took care of 48 children she had gathered "from the streets or from the unfit parents" until she was able to find "suitable homes for them".

== Recognition ==
Ferguson gained a degree of prominence during her lifetime because of her charitable work, as evidenced by the attention she received from the press when she died. Examples were the notice about her death in The New York Times on July 13, 1854, and a brief biography published by the Tribune on July 20, 1854. As a tribute to her work, the Katy Ferguson Home for unwed mothers was established in New York in 1920. Ferguson was also included among 330 notable persons in a biographical dictionary of Benson J. Lossing.

In 2023, Keyarrah Bell-Flynn, in conjunction with the Second Presbyterian Church, petitioned to name 95th Street between Central Park West and Columbus Avenue after Catherine Ferguson in honor of her charitable work and lifetime achievements.
