= Wayne County Regional Educational Service Agency =

Educational agency in Michigan, United States

Location
- Wayne County, Michigan; United States

District information
- Type: Intermediate school district
- Superintendent: Dr. Daveda Colbert
- NCES District ID: 2680995

Other information
- Website: https://resa.net

The Wayne County Regional Educational Service Agency or Wayne RESA is a regional educational service agency for schools in Wayne County, Michigan within Metro Detroit. Its headquarters is in the Wayne RESA Education Center in Wayne. It provides services such as group purchasing, computer service, and staff development. Its service sector covers 33 local school districts having approximately 20,000 teachers and 400,000 students. As of 2021 the superintendent of Wayne RESA is Dr. Daveda Colbert.
