= Brumana International =

Defunct tennis tournament
- Tour: ILTF World Circuit (1927–69) men (1927–72) women ILTF Independent Circuit (1970–75) men (1973–75) women ATP Challenger Tour (1993–95) men
- Founded: 1927; 99 years ago
- Abolished: 1995; 31 years ago
- Location: Broumana, Lebanon
- Venue: Broumana Country Club
- Surface: Clay / outdoor

The Brumana International was a men's and women's international clay court tournament was founded in 1927. It was played at Brumana Country Club, Broumana, Lebanon until 1970 when it was discontinued.

== History ==
The tournament was first established in 1927 when it was held at the Friends' Syrian Mission, Broumana, Lebanon. The tournament was not staged continually due the political situation on the country and with the advent of the World War II. Following the second world war the tournament was given a permanent home at the Broumana Country Club sports complex in 1952. The tournament continued to be staged annually until 1975 when it was discontinued due to the Lebanon Civil War. It would be 18 years before the tournament resumed again in 1993, as the ATP Beirut Challenger event, which continued until 1995 when it was also abolished.

== Finals ==
=== Men's singles ===
(incomplete roll)

Year	Winners	Runners-up	Score
↓ ILTF World Circuit ↓
1931	(Libya) Ernest Farah	(United Kingdom) Victor Erskine Lindop	2–6, 3–6, 6–1, 7–5, 6–3.
1952	(France) Gil de Kermadec	(Turkey) Nazmi Bari	6–1, 3–6, 6–3, 6–2.
1953	(Philippines) Felicisimo Ampon	(Philippines) Raymundo Deyro	6–4, 7–5, 6–3.
1954	(Brazil) Armando Vieira	(Denmark) Jorgen Ulrich	6–2, 6–1, 6–1.
1955	(Egypt) Jaroslav Drobný	(Chile) Luis Ayala	6–3, 6–4, 5–7, 7–5.
1956	(United States) Budge Patty	(Egypt) Jaroslav Drobný	6–4, 3–6, 6–2, 6–1.
1957	(United Kingdom) Roger Becker	(Australia) Mervyn Rose	3–6, 3–6, 6–4, 6–2, 6–1.
1958	Event not held		
1959	(Sweden) Jan-Erik Lundqvist	(Australia) Bob Howe	7–5, 6–1, 6–4.
1960	(Chile) Luis Ayala	(India) Ramanathan Krishnan	6–4, 6–4, 1–6, 8–6.
1961	(Spain) Manuel Santana	(Australia) Fred Stolle	6–3, 8–10, 1–6, 6–3, 6–3.
1962	(Australia) Roy Emerson	(Australia) Neale Fraser	6–2, 6–3, 0–6, 6–3.
1963	(Australia) Roy Emerson (2)	(South Africa) Gordon Forbes	6–2, 6–2, 6–2.
1964	(Brazil) Ronald Barnes	(Australia) Ken Fletcher	6–4, 10–8, 6–3.
1965	(West Germany) Christian Kuhnke	(Spain) José Luis Arilla	3–6, 6–4, 6–3, 6–4.
1966	(Denmark) Jorgen Ulrich	(Chile) Patricio Rodríguez	6–4, 1–6, 1–6, 6–1, 6–3.
1967	(Australia) Dick Crealy	(Ecuador) Miguel Olvera	6–3, 6–2, 6–4.
1968	(Brazil) José Edison Mandarino	(Chile) Patricio Rodríguez	5–7, 6–4, 6–3, 6–3.
↓ Open era ↓
1969	(South Africa) Bob Hewitt	(Brazil) José Edison Mandarino	7–5, 7–5, 6–2.
↓ ILTF Independent Circuit ↓
1970	(Hungary) Istvan Gulyas	(Australia) John Alexander	6–3, 14–12, 6–8, 7–5.
1971	(United Kingdom) Gerald Battrick	(South Africa) Bob Hewitt	6–4, 6–2, 3–6, 6–8, 6–1.
1972	(West Germany) Wilhelm Bungert	(South Africa) Byron Bertram	6–3, 6–2, 6–4.
1973	(Czechoslovakia) Jan Kodeš	(Spain) Juan Gisbert Sr.	6–3, 10–8, 5–7, 6–1.
1974	(Czechoslovakia) Jiří Hřebec	(Czechoslovakia) Vladimir Zednik	6–4, 6–4, 6–4.
1975	(Socialist Federal Republic of Yugoslavia) Niki Pilic	(Egypt) Ismail El Shafei	7–6, 3–6, 7–6, 6–7, 6–4.
↓ ATP Challenger Tour ↓
1993	(West Germany) Thierry Champion	(Argentina) Christian Miniussi	6–4, 7–6.
1994	(Haiti) Ronald Agénor	(France) Henri Leconte	6–1, 6–4.
1995	(Morocco) Karim Alami	(Russia) Andrei Cherkasov	6–4, 6–2.

=== Women's singles ===
(incomplete roll)

Year	Winners	Runners-up	Score
↓ ILTF World Circuit ↓
1952	(Turkey) Bahtiye Musluoğlu	(Lebanon) Vera Mattar	6–2, 6–1.
1953	(France) Jacqueline Kermina	(Austria) Elizabeth Fischer Broz	6–4, 6–0.
1954	(West Germany) Erika Vollmer	(France) Ginette Bucaille	4–6, 6–4, 6–3.
1955	(France) Maud Galtier	(Australia) Daphne Seeney	6–3, 7–5.
1956	(West Germany) Edda Buding	(Australia) Daphne Seeney	6–1, 8–6.
1957	(Mexico) Yola Ramírez	(Australia) Margaret Hellyer	6–2, 7–5.
1958	Event not held		
1959	(Italy) Lea Pericoli	(West Germany) Renate Ostermann	6–3, 6–2.
1960	(South Africa) Sandra Reynolds	(South Africa) Renée Schuurman	3–6, 6–4, 9–7.
1961	(Spain) Carmen Coronado	(Denmark) Pia Balling	6–2, 6–1.
1962	(South Africa) Jean Forbes	(West Germany) Helga Schultze	6–3, 6–3.
1963	(South Africa) Annette Van Zyl	(South Africa) Margaret Hunt	6–1, 6–0.
1964	(Australia) Judy Tegart	(United Kingdom) Deidre Catt	4–6, 6–4, 6–3.
1965	(France) Francoise Durr	(South Africa) Annette Van Zyl	6–4, 6–1.
1966	(Rhodesia) Pat Walkden	(South Africa) Glenda Swan	6–1, 6–1.
1967	(Australia) Gail Sherriff	(Czechoslovakia) Vlasta Vopičková	6–1, 1–6, 6–2.
1968	(Australia) Gail Sherriff (2)	(Australia) Lesley Turner Bowrey	6–2, 9–7.
↓ Open era ↓
1969	(Rhodesia) Pat Walkden (2)	(Australia) Fay Toyne-Moore	6–3, 3–6, 6–1.
1970	(United Kingdom) Winnie Shaw	(United Kingdom) Ann Haydon Jones	1–6, 6–2, 6–1.
1971	(Uruguay) Fiorella Bonicelli	(Rhodesia) Daphne Pattison	11–9, 6–2.
1972	(Austria) Sonja Pachta	(United States) Julie Anthony	6–4, 3–6, 6–4.
↓ ILTF Independent Circuit ↓
1973	(Argentina) Raquel Giscafré	(Czechoslovakia) Alena Palmeová-West	6–4, 9–7.
1974	(Australia) Christine Matison	(Argentina) Raquel Giscafré	6–2, 2–6, 6–1.
1975	(West Germany) Heidi Eisterlehner	(Australia) Christine Matison	6–3, 6–3.

== Other tournaments ==
During its run the Brumana International was usually held mid to late summer, early autumn. Another international tournament the Lebanon International Championships also known as the Beirut International, also called the Beirut Spring Tournament was held in mid spring usually April, that event was held at the American University of Beirut.

== Sources ==
- Schoucair, Nohad Victor (2013). Lebanon International Tennis Past. https://lebanon-tennis-history.com/. Beirut, Lebanon: Lebanon International Tennis.
