= Kovaleski =

Kovaleski is a surname of Polish origin. The standard Polish spelling is Kowalewski. Notable people with the name include:

- Fred Kovaleski (1924–2018), American tennis player, spy, and businessman
- Mike Kovaleski (born 1965), American football linebacker
- Serge F. Kovaleski (born 1961), American investigative journalist
- Tony Kovaleski (born 1959), American investigative journalist
