= Lebanon International Championships =

Defunct tennis tournament
- Tour: ILTF World Circuit (1954–69) men (1954–71) women ILTF Independent Circuit (1970–71) men
- Founded: 1954; 71 years ago
- Abolished: 1971; 54 years ago
- Editions: 8 men 5 women
- Location: Beirut, Lebanon
- Venue: American University of Beirut
- Surface: Clay / outdoor

The Lebanon International Championships also known as the Beirut International or the Beirut Spring Tournament was a men's and women's international clay court tournament was founded in 1954. It was played at American University of Beirut Alumni Tennis Club, Beirut, Lebanon until 1971 when it was discontinued.

== History ==
The tournament was first established in 1954 when it was held at the American University of Beirut Alumni Tennis Club, Beirut, Lebanon. The tournament was not staged continually with only seven editions held. The tournament continued to be staged annually until 1971 when it was discontinued.

== Finals ==
=== Men's singles ===
(incomplete roll)

Year	Winners	Runners-up	Score
↓ ILTF World Circuit ↓
1954	(Italy) Giuseppe Merlo	(Sweden) Lennart Bergelin	RR event standings.
1956	(United States) Lew Hoad	(United States) Bob Perry	6–3, 6–4, 6–2.
1957	(Belgium) Philippe Washer	(Australia) Warren Woodcock	1–6, 9–7, 6–2, 6–2.
1958	(United States) Myron Franks	(Australia) Fred Stolle	7–5, 2–6, 6–4, 3–6, 7–5.
1962	(South Africa) Bob Hewitt	(Australia) Ken Fletcher	7–9, 6–2, 6–2, 6–3.
1968	(Brazil) José Edison Mandarino	(Chile) Patricio Rodríguez	5–7, 6–4, 6–3.
↓ Open era ↓
↓ ILTF Independent Circuit ↓
1970	(Italy) Nicola Pietrangeli	(Australia) Barry Phillips-Moore	6–1, 6–0.
1971	(Greece) Nicholas Kalogeropoulos	(Australia) John Bartlett	7–5, 7–5, 6–1.

=== Women's singles ===
(incomplete roll)

Year	Winners	Runners-up	Score
↓ ILTF World Circuit ↓
1954	(West Germany) Totta Zehden	(Lebanon) Vera Mattar	6–2, 6–3.
1956	(United Kingdom) Angela Mortimer	(Australia) Jenny Hoad	6–2, 6–3.
1957	(Hungary) Suzy Kormoczy	(West Germany) Edda Buding	4–6, 6–2, 6–2.
↓ Open era ↓
1970	(Canada) Andrée Martin	(Canada) Jane O'Hara	4–6, 6–2, 6–3.
1971	(Uruguay) Fiorella Bonicelli	(Netherlands) Ada Bakker	7–5, 6–4.

== Other tournaments ==
During its run the Beirut International was usually held in mid spring usually April. Another international tournament the Brumana International was held in mid to late summer usually end of July to August, that event was held at the Broumana Country Club.

== See also ==
- Category:National and multi-national tennis tournaments

== Sources ==
- Schoucair, Nohad Victor (2013). Lebanon International Tennis Past. https://lebanon-tennis-history.com/. Beirut, Lebanon: Lebanon International Tennis.
