= Alexandria International Championships =

Alexandria International Championships International Championships of Alexandria

Defunct tennis tournament
- Founded: 1914; 111 years ago
- Abolished: 1975; 50 years ago
- Location: Alexandria, Egypt
- Venue: Alexandria Sporting Club
- Surface: Clay

The Alexandria International Championships or International Championships of Alexandria was a men's and women's international clay court tennis tournament founded in 1914. It was played at the Alexandria Sporting Club (f. 1890), Alexandria, Egypt. The tournament ran until 1975.

Seven editions of this event were valid as the International Championships of Egypt at Alexandria.

== History ==
The Alexandria International Championships was a combined men's and women's clay court tennis tournament founded in 1914 and played at the Alexandria Sporting Club, Alexandria, Egypt. The championships were staged until 1975. For the years 1937 '39 '46 '50 '52 '53 '55 the editions were valid as "International Championships of Egypt" when played in Alexandria. That tournament was mainly held Gezireh Sporting Club, Cairo.

== Finals ==
=== Men's singles ===
(incomplete roll)

Year	Winner	Runner-up	Score
Alexandria International Championships
1914	(Greece) Augustos Zerlendis	(France) H.J. Pailhé	6-3, 6-3
1934	(United Kingdom) Pat Hughes	(Kingdom of Yugoslavia) Franjo Punčec	6–4, 2–6, 6–4
1935	(Czechoslovakia) Roderich Menzel	(Austria) Hermann Artens	6-4 6-0 6-0
1936	(Czechoslovakia) Roderich Menzel (2)	(Germany) Henner Henkel	3–6, 6–2, 5–7, 6–0, 6–4
International Championships of Egypt
1937	(Germany) Gottfried von Cramm	(Germany) Henner Henkel	6–1, 6–2, 6–4
Alexandria International Championships
1938	(Republic of China (1912–1949)) Kho Sin-Khie	(Kingdom of Yugoslavia) Dragutin Mitić	6–2, 6–4, 10-8
International Championships of Egypt
1939	(Germany) Gottfried von Cramm (2)	(United States) Don McNeill	7–5, 6–2, 6–8, 6–2
1940/1945	Not held (due to World War II)		
Alexandria International Championships
1947	(France) Henri Cochet	(France) Robert Abdesselam	6–3, 2–6, 6–3, 8–6
1948	(France) Robert Abdesselam	(Belgium) Philippe Washer	3–6, 4–6, 6–3, 6–4, 6–1
1949	(United States) Frank Parker	(Spain) Pedro Masip	
International Championships of Egypt
1950	(West Germany) Gottfried von Cramm (3)	(Czechoslovakia) Jaroslav Drobný	8–6, 6–3, 9–11, 6-4
Alexandria International Championships
1951	(Czechoslovakia) Jaroslav Drobný	(United States) Irvin Dorfman	6–1, 12–10, 6-2
International Championships of Egypt
1952	(Egypt) Jaroslav Drobný	(Poland) Władysław Skonecki	7–5, 6–3, 6–3
1953	(Egypt) Jaroslav Drobný (2)	(Australia) George Worthington	6–4, 7–5, 6–2
Alexandria International Championships
1954	(Argentina) Enrique Morea	(Italy) Fausto Gardini	6–2, 6–0, 5–7, 6–3
International Championships of Egypt
1955	(Italy) Fausto Gardini	(Italy) Giuseppe Merlo	8–6, 6–0, 8–6
Alexandria International Championships
1956	(Australia) Lew Hoad	(United States) Fred Kovaleski	
1957	(Sweden) Sven Viktor Davidson	(Poland) Władysław Skonecki	6–4, 7–5, 6–3
1958	(United States) Barry MacKay (tennis)	(Cuba) Orlando Garrido	6–4, 7–5, 6–2
1959	(Italy) Giuseppe Merlo	(Italy) Nicola Pietrangeli	4–6, 6–4, 7–5, 6–3
1960	(Socialist Federal Republic of Yugoslavia) Boro Jovanović	(United Kingdom) Bobby Wilson	6–4, 7–5, 6–3
1961	(Italy) Nicola Pietrangeli	(Australia) Barry Phillips-Moore	6–2, 6–4, 6–3
1962	(Sweden) Jan-Erik Lundqvist	(Socialist Federal Republic of Yugoslavia) Boro Jovanović	6–2, 2–6, 2–6, 7–5, 6–4
1963	(Sweden) Jan-Erik Lundqvist (2)	(West Germany) Wilhelm Bungert	6–2, 6–2, 6–2
1964	(Australia) Martin Mulligan	(Sweden) Jan-Erik Lundqvist	8–10, 6–3, 6–0, 6–3
1965	(Hungary) István Gulyás	(Australia) Martin Mulligan	4–6, 6–4, 6–4, 9–7
1966	(Romania) Ion Țiriac	(United States) Marty Riessen	2–6, 6–3, 6–3, 6–4
1967	(Chile) Jaime Pinto Bravo	(Romania) Ilie Năstase	9–7, 2–6, 6–8, 6–3, 7–5
↓ Open Era ↓
1968	(Soviet Union) Vladimir Korotkov	(Czechoslovakia) Milan Holeček	4–6, 6–1, 6–8, 6–2, 6–3
1969	(Hungary) István Gulyás (2)	(Egypt) Ismail El Shafei	6–1, 3–6, 6–3, 7–5
1970	(Poland) Wieslaw Gasiorek	(West Germany) Harald Elschenbroich	
1971	(Egypt) Ibrahim Mahmoud	(Soviet Union) Vladimir Korotkov	3–6, 4–6, 6–2, 7–5, 6–1
1972	(Soviet Union) Alexander Metreveli	(Australia) Ian Fletcher	9–7, 6–2, 6–4
1973	(France) Patrice Dominguez	(Poland) Tadeusz Nowicki	6–3, 9–7, 5–7, 6–2
1974	(Soviet Union) Teimuraz Kakulia	(Hungary) János Benyik	6–1, 6–3, 6–2
1975	(Hungary) Balázs Taróczy	(Soviet Union) Anatoli Volkov	w.o.

=== Women's singles ===
(incomplete roll)

Year	Winner	Runner-up	Score
Alexandria International Championships
1914	(United Kingdom) R. Aighton	(United Kingdom) Mrs Adamson	0–6, 8–6, 10-8
1936	(United Kingdom) Billie Yorke	(Austria) Rosl Kraus	6-1, 6-3
1937	(Denmark) Hilde Krahwinkel Sperling	(France) Simonne Mathieu	6-2, 6-3
1938	(United States) Gracyn Wheeler	(United Kingdom) Gaby Curtis	6-2, 6-0
1939	(United Kingdom) Gaby Curtis	(Republic of Ireland) Josephine Harman	6-2, 6-4
1940/1945	Not held (due to World War II)		
International Championships of Egypt
1946	(France) Simonne Mathieu	(Lebanon) Vera Mattar	6-1, 6-1
Alexandria International Championships
1947	(Italy) Annalisa Bossi	(France) Suzanne Pannetier	5–7, 7–5, 6–2
1948	(France) Nelly Landry	(Luxembourg) Alice Weiwers	6-1, 6-0
1949	(France) Nelly Landry (2)	(United Kingdom) Joy Gannon	6-1, 6-0
International Championships of Egypt
1950	(United States) Pat Canning Todd	(United States) Gussie Moran	1–6, 6–3, 6–0
Alexandria International Championships
1951	(United States) Doris Hart	(United States) Louise Brough	7-5, 6-2
Egypt International Championships
1952	(Egypt) Betsy Abbas	(France) Suzanne Mathieu	6-1, 6-4
1953	(United States) Dottie Head Knode	(United Kingdom) Patricia Ward	6-0, 6-2
Alexandria International Championships
1954	(Egypt) Betsy Abbas (2)	(West Germany) Totta Zehden	4–6, 6–2, 6–3
International Championships of Egypt
1955	(Italy) Silvana Lazzarino	(United Kingdom) Angela Mortimer	w.o.
Alexandria International Championships
1956	(United Kingdom) Angela Mortimer	(United States) Althea Gibson	6-3, 6-4
1957	(West Germany) Edda Buding	(West Germany) Ilse Buding	6–4, 1–0, ret.
1958	(United States) Dottie Head Knode	(Egypt) Andrea Eid	6-1, 6-0
1959	(Czechoslovakia) Věra Pužejová	(East Germany) Eva Mannschatz Johannes	6-1, 6-0
1960	(Australia) Margaret Hellyer	(Greece) X. Vassiliadis	6-3, 6-4
1961	(Czechoslovakia) Věra Pužejová (2)	(Australia) Margaret Hellyer	6-1, 6-3
1962	(United States) Donna Floyd	(United Kingdom) Lorna Cornell Cawthorn	9–7, 7–9, 6–2
1963	(Australia) Jill Blackman	(United Kingdom) Rita Bentley	6–2, 2–6, 6–2
1964	(Australia) Jan Lehane	(West Germany) Helga Schultze	3–6, 6–3, 6–4
1965	(Australia) Madonna Schacht	(Australia) Gail Sherriff	6–3, 2–6, 7–5
1966	(Soviet Union) Galina Baksheeva	(United States) Carole Caldwell Graebner	7-5, 6-2
1967	(West Germany) Helga Schultze	(Soviet Union) Anna Dmitrieva	4–6, 6–1, 8–6
↓ Open Era ↓
1968	(Soviet Union) Anna Dmitrieva	(United Kingdom) Robin Blakelock-Lloyd	6-0, 6-3
1969	(United Kingdom) Nell Truman	(Soviet Union) Olga Morozova	6–3, 2–6, 6–3
1970	(Soviet Union) Olga Morozova	(Czechoslovakia) Marcela Barochova	6-4, 6-0
1971	(Czechoslovakia) Alena Palmeová-West	(Soviet Union) Yelena Gorina Granaturova	6-4, 6-4
1972	(Czechoslovakia) Alena Palmeová-West (2)	(France) Nathalie Fuchs	6–3, 1–6, 6–1
1973	(France) Nathalie Fuchs	(France) Odile de Roubin	6-2, 6-0
1974	(Soviet Union) Marina Chuvirina	(Czechoslovakia) Marie Neumannova	6–3, 5–7, 6–4
1975	(United Kingdom) Sue Barker	(United Kingdom) Jackie Fayter	5–7, 7–5, 6–3

== See also ==
- International Championships of Egypt (Cairo)
