= 1948 NCAA tennis championships =

- Date: June 1948
- Edition: 3rd
- Location: Los Angeles, California

Champions

Men's singles
- (United States) Harry Likas (San Francisco)

Men's doubles
- (United States) Fred Kovaleski / (United States) Bernard Bartzen (William & Mary)

Men's team
- William & Mary (2nd title)
| ← 1947 · | NCAA tennis championships | · 1949 → |

The 1948 NCAA Tennis Championships were the 3rd annual tournaments to determine the national champions of NCAA men's singles, doubles, and team collegiate tennis in the United States.

The team championship was won by defending champions William & Mary, their second team national title. The Indians finished one point ahead of San Francisco (6–5) and Harry Likas at UCLA In Los Angeles.

== Host site ==
This year's tournaments were hosted by UCLA in Los Angeles, California.

== Team scoring ==
Until 1977, the men's team championship was determined by points awarded based on individual performances in the singles and doubles events.
