= Vera Mattar =

Lebanese female tennis player

- Country (sports): Lebanon
- Born: 1916

Singles
- Career titles: 8

Grand Slam singles results
- Wimbledon: 1R (1948)

Doubles
- Career titles: 3

Grand Slam mixed doubles results
- Wimbledon: 2R (1948 1960)

Vera Mattar (born 1916) is a Lebanese former tennis player. She is the first Lebanese female tennis player to compete in the Grand Slam.

She played in Singles at the Wimbledon in 1948. She lost to the American Barbara Scofield in the Second Round. Her partner in mixed doubles Egyptian Eddie Mandelbaum lost in the Second Round to the Australian player John Bromwich and American Louise Brough.

Competed in mixed doubles at Wimbledon in 1960 with her partner compatriot Karim Fawaz lost in the Second Round to the Mexican player Rafael Osuna and American Sally Moore.

== Career finals ==
=== Singles (8–5) ===
Result	No.	Year	Tournament	Location	Surface	Opponent	Score
Win	1.	April 1944	Israel Spring International Championships	Tel Aviv, Israel	Clay	(Israel) Gertrude Kornfeld	1–6, 6–4, 7–5
Loss	1.	March 1946	Cairo International Championships	Cairo, Egypt	Clay	(France) Simonne Mathieu	3–6, 3–6
Loss	2.	April 1946	International Championships of Egypt	Alexandria, Egypt	Clay	(France) Simonne Mathieu	1–6, 1–6
Win	2.	July 1948	Durham County Championships	Sunderland, UK	Grass	(United Kingdom) Elizabeth Wilson	6–4, 6–4
Win	3.	September 1948	International Championships of Turkey	Ankara, Turkey	Clay	(Turkey) Mualla Gorodetzky	3–6, 7–5, 13–11
Loss	3.	September 1948	Istanbul International Championships	Istanbul, Turkey	Clay	(Turkey) Mualla Gorodetzky	0–6, 6–4, 7–9
Loss	4.	September 1948	Greek International Championships	Athens, Greece	Clay	(United Kingdom) Jean Quertier	1–6, 3–6
Loss	5.	August 1952.	Brumana International	Brummana, Lebanon	Clay	(Turkey) Bahtiye Musluoğlu	2–6, 1–6
Win	4.	November 1953	Lebanon Championships	Beirut, Lebanon	Clay	(Lebanon) Athina Kyriacopoulo	1–6, 6–1, 6–2
Win	5.	November 1954	National Championships of Lebanon	Beirut, Lebanon	Clay	(Lebanon) Nena Farrah	6–2, 6–0
Win	6.	June 1955	Lebanon National Championships	Beirut, Lebanon	Clay	(Lebanon) Nena Farrah	6–2, 6–1
Win	7.	June 1957	Lebanon National Championships	Beirut, Lebanon	Clay	(Lebanon) Nena Farrah	6–2, 6–3
Win	8.	November 1957	Lebanese National Championships	Beirut, Lebanon	Clay	(Lebanon) Athina Kyriacopoulo	6–0, 6–3

=== Doubles (3–4) ===
Result	No.	Year	Tournament	location	Surface	Partner	Opponents	Score
Loss	1.	March 1946	International Championships of Egypt	Cairo, Egypt	Clay	(United Kingdom) Lavender Campbell	(United Kingdom) Joy Brown (France) Simonne Mathieu	3–6, 0–6
Win	1.	August 1946	?	Istanbul, Turkey	Clay	(France) Simonne Mathieu	(Turkey) Mualla Gorodetzky (Turkey) Bahtiye Musluoğlu	6–2, 6–1
Loss	2.	March 1948	Egyptian Championships	Cairo, Egypt	Clay	(France) Suzanne Pannetier	(France) Nelly Landry (Luxembourg) Alice Weiwers	2–6, 4–6
Win	2.	September 1948	International Championships of Istanbul	Istanbul, Turkey	Clay	(United Kingdom) Jean Quertier	(Turkey) Mualla Gorodetzky (Turkey) Bahtiye Musluoğlu	6–3, 6–2
Loss	3.	March 1949	Championships of Egypt	Cairo, Egypt	Clay	(United Kingdom) Joy Brown	(France) Nelly Landry (United Kingdom) Joy Mottram	3–6, 2–6
Loss	4.	March 1949	Alexandria International Championships	Alexandria, Egypt	Clay	(United Kingdom) Joy Brown	(France) Nelly Landry (United Kingdom) Megan Buxton-Knight	2–6, 5–7
Win	3.	August 1952	Brummana International Championships	Brummana, Lebanon	Clay	(Turkey) Bahtiye Musluoğlu	(Lebanon) Renée Abi Hatab (Lebanon) Nena Farrah	6–2, 6–2
