= Bahtiye Musluoğlu =

Turkısh tennis player (1918–1999)

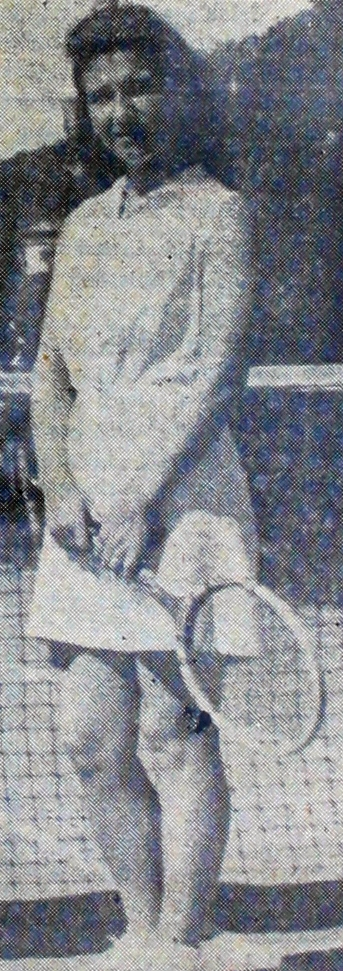
- Musluoğlu in 1950
- Country (sports): Turkey
- Born: 1918 Bolu, Ottoman Empire
- Died: 1999 (aged 80–81) Ankara, Turkey
- Plays: Right-handed

Grand Slam singles results
- French Open: 3R (1950)

Grand Slam doubles results
- French Open: 1R (1950)

Bahtiye Musluoğlu (1918–1999) was a Turkish tennis player, the first Turkish female tennis player to compete in a grand slam and win a match. She achieved success in international tournaments, participating in many tournaments in Beirut and Athens.

Born in 1918 in Bolu, she started playing tennis while studying in Ankara, where she became a skilled player and often trained with male players.

In the early 1940s, Musluoğlu's rival Mualla Gorodetzky dominated women's tennis. The two contested the final of the Turkish Championships for several years. In 1948, Musluoğlu defeated Gorodetzky to win her first national title in the Turkish Championships.

In 1950, French Tennis Federation invited her to France, where she played in singles at the French Open and lost to the American player Margaret duPont in the third round.

== Career finals ==
=== Singles (5–4) ===
Result	No.	Year	Location	Surface	Opponent	Score
Loss	1.	August 1946	Istanbul, Turkey	Clay	(France) Simonne Mathieu	3–6, 2–6
Loss	2.	June 1947	Athens, Greece	Clay	(Turkey) Mualla Gorodetzky	4–6, 6–8
Win	1.	August 1947	Ankara, Turkey	Clay	(Turkey) Mualla Gorodetzky	3–6, 6–3, 6–1
Win	2.	September 1947	Istanbul, Turkey	Clay	(Turkey) Mualla Gorodetzky	6–4, 2–6, 6–4
Loss	3.	September 1949	Ankara, Turkey	Clay	(Italy) Annalisa Bossi	4–6, 4–6
Win	3.	July 1950	Ankara, Turkey	Clay	(Turkey) Mualla Gorodetzky	6–1, 6–1
Win	4.	August 1952	Ankara, Turkey	Clay	(Turkey) Gönül Erk	6–3, 2–0 ret.
Win	5.	August 1952	Brummana, Lebanon	Clay	(Lebanon) Vera Mattar	6–2, 6–1
Loss	4.	September 1952	Ankara, Turkey	Clay	(United States) Dorothy Head Knode	1–6, 3–6

=== Doubles (10–3) ===
Result	No.	Year	location	Surface	Partner	Opponents	Score
Loss	1.	August 1946	Istanbul, Turkey	Clay	(Turkey) Mualla Gorodetzky	(France) Simonne Mathieu (Lebanon) Vera Mattar	2–6, 1–6
Win	1.	June 1947	Athens, Greece	Clay	(Turkey) Mualla Gorodetzky	(Greece) Aspasia Kyriakou (Greece) Angie Lenou	6–3, 6–4
Win	2.	August 1947	Ankara, Turkey	Clay	(Turkey) Mualla Gorodetzky	(United Kingdom) Nancy Fontes (United Kingdom) Denise Pritchard	6–2, 6–3
Win	3.	September 1947	Istanbul, Turkey	Clay	(Turkey) Mualla Gorodetzky	(Italy) Manuela Bologna (Italy) Nicoletta Majno	6–2, 5–7, 6–2
Win	4.	September 1948	Ankara, Turkey	Clay	(Turkey) Mualla Gorodetzky	(Greece) Anna Kiriakos (Greece) Helena Voultzos	6–4 5–7 6–4
Loss	2.	September 1948	Istanbul, Turkey	Clay	(Turkey) Mualla Gorodetzky	(United Kingdom) Jean Quertier (Lebanon) Vera Mattar	3–6, 2–6
Win	5.	September 1948	Athens, Greece	Clay	(Turkey) Mualla Gorodetzky	(Egypt) Georgina Greiss (United Kingdom) Jean Quertier	6–3, 6–3
Win	6.	August 1949	Istanbul, Turkey	Clay	(Turkey) Mualla Gorodetzky	(United Kingdom) Joan Curry (United Kingdom) Peggy Dawson-Scott	6–3, 6–4
Win	7.	September 1949	Ankara, Turkey	Clay	(Turkey) Mualla Gorodetzky	(United Kingdom) Joan Curry (United Kingdom) Peggy Dawson-Scott	6–1, 6–3
Win	8.	July 1950	Ankara, Turkey	Clay	(Turkey) Mualla Gorodetzky	(Italy) Nicla Miglioti (Italy) Lucia Manfredi	6–4, 7–5
Loss	3.	August 1950	Istanbul, Turkey	Clay	(Turkey) Mualla Gorodetzky	(United States) Dorothy Head Knode (Argentina) Mary Terán de Weiss	4–6, 2–6
Win	9.	August 1952	Ankara, Turkey	Clay	(Egypt) Georgina Greiss	(United Kingdom) Louise Dick (United Kingdom) Heather Macfarlane	6–3, 1–6, 6–1
Win	10.	August 1952	Brummana, Lebanon	Clay	(Lebanon) Vera Mattar	(Lebanon) Renée Abi Hatab (Lebanon) Nena Farrah	6–2, 6–2
