= 1950 NCAA tennis championships =

- Date: June 1950
- Edition: 5th
- Location: Austin, Texas
- Venue: University of Texas at Austin

Champions

Men's singles
- (United States) Herbert Flam (UCLA)

Men's doubles
- (United States) Herbert Flam / (United States) Gene Garrett (UCLA)

Men's team
- UCLA (1st title)
← 1949 ·	NCAA tennis championships	· 1951 →

The 1950 NCAA tennis championships were the fifth annual tournaments hosted by the National Collegiate Athletic Association to determine the national champions of men's singles, doubles, and team collegiate tennis among its members in the United States.

UCLA was awarded the team championship, the Bruins' first title. UCLA finished six points ahead of California and USC (11–5).

== Host site ==
This year's tournaments were hosted by the University of Texas at Austin in Austin, Texas.

== Team scoring ==
Until 1977, the men's team championship was determined by points awarded based on individual performances in the singles and doubles events.
