= 1949 NCAA tennis championships =

- Date: June 1949
- Edition: 4th
- Location: Austin, Texas
- Venue: University of Texas at Austin

Champions

Men's singles
- (United States) Jack Tuero (Tulane)

Men's doubles
- (United States) James Brink / (United States) Fred Fisher (Washington)

Men's team
- San Francisco (1st title)
← 1948 ·	NCAA tennis championships	· 1950 →

The 1949 NCAA Tennis Championships were the 4th annual tournaments to determine the national champions of NCAA men's singles, doubles, and team collegiate tennis in the United States.

San Francisco captured the team championship, their first in program history. The Dons finished three points ahead of Rollins, Tulane, and Washington (7–4).

== Host site ==
This year's tournaments were hosted by the University of Texas at Austin in Austin, Texas.

== Team scoring ==
Until 1977, the men's team championship was determined by points awarded based on individual performances in the singles and doubles events.
