= Serge F. Kovaleski =

American investigative reporter

- Born: April 8, 1961 (age 65); Cape Town, South Africa
- Education: College of William & Mary (BA)
- Occupation: Investigative journalist
- Writing career
- Years active: 1980s–present
- Notable awards: Pulitzer Prize, 2009; George Polk Award, 2016

Serge Frank Kovaleski (born April 8, 1961) is a South African-born American investigative reporter at The New York Times. He contributed to reporting that won The New York Times a Pulitzer Prize for its investigation of the Eliot Spitzer prostitution scandal.

== Early life ==
Born in Cape Town, South Africa, Kovaleski spent his early childhood in Sydney, Australia, until his family moved to New York City in the 1970s. His father, Fred Kovaleski, was a spy for the Central Intelligence Agency in the 1950s.

He graduated in 1984 from the College of William & Mary in Williamsburg, Virginia, with a degree in philosophy. After receiving his bachelor's degree, Kovaleski studied French philosophy at the Sorbonne in Paris. His travels through Europe before the fall of the Berlin Wall inspired him to become a journalist.

== Career ==
Kovaleski began his journalism career in the mid-1980s at The Miami News. He then worked for the New York Daily News, The Washington Post and Money magazine. He joined The New York Times in July 2006 as an investigative and general assignment reporter on the Metro desk. He joined the Culture desk as an investigative journalist in 2014, and moved to the National desk in 2016.

== Awards ==
In 2009, Kovaleski received a Pulitzer Prize for "Breaking News Reporting".

In 2016, he and Nicholas Kulish, Christopher Drew, Mark Mazzetti, Matthew Rosenberg, Sean D. Naylor and John Ismay received a George Polk Award for their investigation into allegations that members of the U.S. Navy SEAL Team Six abused Afghan detainees.

== Comments by Donald Trump ==
In a speech at a November 24, 2015, rally in Myrtle Beach, South Carolina, presidential candidate Donald Trump falsely claimed that "thousands and thousands of people were cheering" in Jersey City, New Jersey, as the World Trade Center collapsed.

After this claim was questioned, the Trump campaign referred to a September 18, 2001, Washington Post article that Kovaleski had co-authored with Fredrick Kunkle, as substantiation of the claim. According to the article, "law enforcement authorities detained and questioned a number of people who were allegedly seen celebrating the attacks and holding tailgate-style parties on rooftops while they watched the devastation".

Kovaleski issued the following written statement in response to the Trump campaign's adoption of his report as an independent verification of New Jersey–based celebrations following the destruction of the World Trade Center:

"I certainly do not remember anyone saying that thousands or even hundreds of people were celebrating. That was not the case, as best as I can remember."

In apparent response to this written statement, Trump said in a November 25, 2015 speech in Myrtle Beach, South Carolina, "You've got to see this guy: 'Uhh, I don't know what I said. Uhh, I don't remember,' he's going like 'I don't remember. Maybe that's what I said.'" Trump flailed and jerked his arms around. The incident drew widespread domestic and international criticism.

Trump was severely criticized worldwide for mocking Kovaleski's disability. Kovaleski has arthrogryposis, a condition causing joint contracture in his right arm and hand, of which Trump has been alleged to have made an exaggerated, inaccurate imitation. Following domestic and international condemnation, Trump said that he was merely mimicking a "flustered reporter" and could not have mocked Kovaleski's disability because he did not know what Kovaleski looked like. Kovaleski has said that while reporting on Trump for the New York Daily News, the two had been on a first-name basis and had met face-to-face on a dozen occasions, including interviews and press conferences in the late 1980s. That the two knew each other was corroborated by multiple other witnesses.

=== Meryl Streep speech ===
During her January 8, 2017, acceptance speech at the Golden Globe Award ceremony, the actress Meryl Streep referred to the incident as "one performance this year that stunned me". Streep said:

It sank its hooks in my heart. Not because it was good; there was nothing good about it. But it was effective and it did its job. It made its intended audience laugh, and show their teeth. It was that moment when the person asking to sit in the most respected seat in our country imitated a disabled reporter. Someone he outranked in privilege, power and the capacity to fight back. It kind of broke my heart when I saw it, and I still can't get it out of my head, because it wasn't in a movie. It was real life. And this instinct to humiliate, when it's modeled by someone in the public platform, by someone powerful, it filters down into everybody's life, because it kinda gives permission for other people to do the same thing. Disrespect invites disrespect, violence incites violence. And when the powerful use their position to bully others we all lose.

Trump responded on Twitter, calling Streep "one of the most over-rated actresses in Hollywood".
