= Fred Kovaleski =

American tennis player, spy, and businessman

- Full name: Fred Thomas Kovaleski
- Country (sports): United States
- Born: October 8, 1924 Maynard, Massachusetts, US
- Died: May 25, 2018 (aged 93) Bronx, New York, US

Singles
- Career record: 164-76
- Career titles: 15

Grand Slam singles results
- French Open: 3R (1954)
- Wimbledon: 3R (1954)
- US Open: 4R (1957)

Doubles
- Career record: 0–0

Fred Thomas Kovaleski (October 8, 1924 – May 25, 2018) was an American tennis player, spy, and businessman.

== Early life ==
Fred Kovaleski was born October 8, 1924, in Maynard, Massachusetts, and grew up in Hamtramck, Michigan. Hamtramck was majority ethnically Polish at the time, and both of Kovaleski's parents had immigrated from Poland. In high school, he showed aptitude in handball and tennis, and was coached by Jean Hoxie. By age 17, he played on the junior US Davis Cup team.

== Education and military service ==
He enrolled at the College of William & Mary on a tennis scholarship, but enlisted in the United States Army as an air cadet in 1942. In World War II, he helped liberate a Japanese prisoner of war camp in Los Baños, in the Philippines. After the war, he returned to William & Mary and the men's tennis team. With Kovaleski as a member, the team won the 1947 and 1948 NCAA Tennis Championships. At the latter tournament, he and Bernard Bartzen won the overall doubles title.

== CIA and business career ==
After graduation in 1949, Kovaleski continued to play tennis. He competed at the 1950 Wimbledon Championships, losing in the fourth round to Australian Frank Sedgman. Kovaleski was recruited by the Central Intelligence Agency, with international travel providing him a cover for performing espionage. He left the CIA when he fell in love with Manya Jabes, a woman of Russian ancestry, and the CIA did not approve, though the agency would later hire both of them to translate Russian. After the birth of his son Serge, Kovaleski left the CIA for good. He went on to work in the international divisions of Pepsi, Revlon, Schering-Plough, and Nabisco.

== Personal life ==
Kovaleski lived in Manhattan when he died of prostate cancer on May 25, 2018. His son, Serge F. Kovaleski, also graduated from William & Mary, and works as an investigative reporter for The New York Times, where he has won a Pulitzer Prize.

== Literature ==
- Serge F. Kovaleski: The Most Dangerous Game. In: Washington Post, January 15, 2006
