= Brummana =

Brummana برمانا
- City
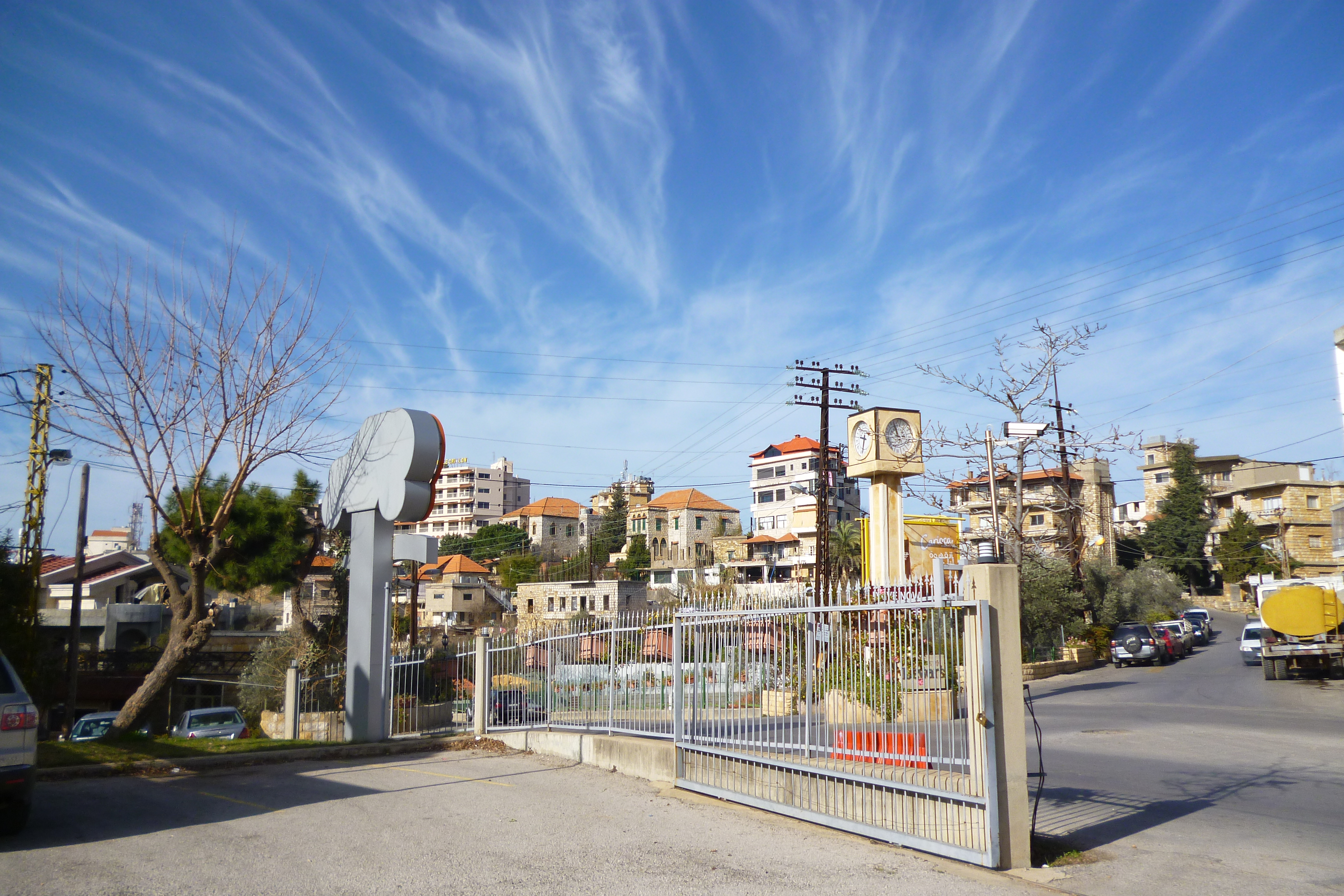

- Location within Lebanon
- Coordinates: 33°52′57″N 35°37′42″E
- Country: Lebanon
- Governorate: Mount Lebanon Governorate
- District: Matn District
- Highest elevation: 775 m (2,543 ft)
- Lowest elevation: 600 m (2,000 ft)
- Time zone: UTC+2 (EET)
  - Summer (DST): UTC+3 (EEST)
- Dialing code: +96124

Brummana (Arabic: برمانا, romanized: Brummānā), also known as Broummana, is a town in the Matn District of the Mount Lebanon Governorate in Lebanon. It is located east of Beirut, overlooking the capital and the Mediterranean. Brummana has long been a summer destination for visitors and locals. It is also the green lung of the region, with many pine trees lining its streets.

== Overview ==
As most of the villages, Brummana has an Aramaic name which most probably means "house of Rammana, the God of Air, Storm and Thunder". In the location where Brummana was built it was thought that the god Rammanu lived there, which gave the name "House of Rammanu", and it is known that the letter B at the beginning of the name of villages refers to "beit" in Syriac, meaning "house".

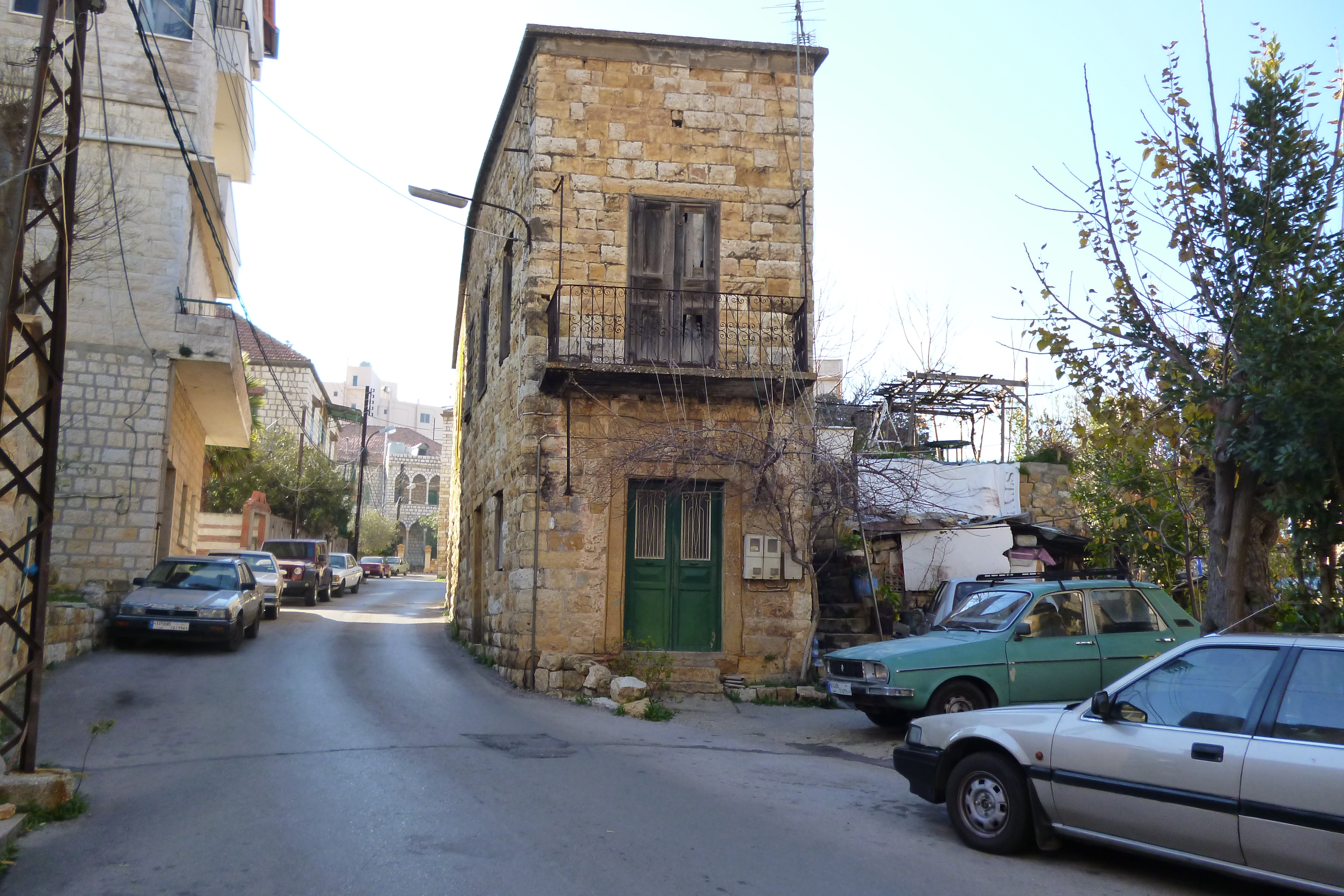
Old Brummana

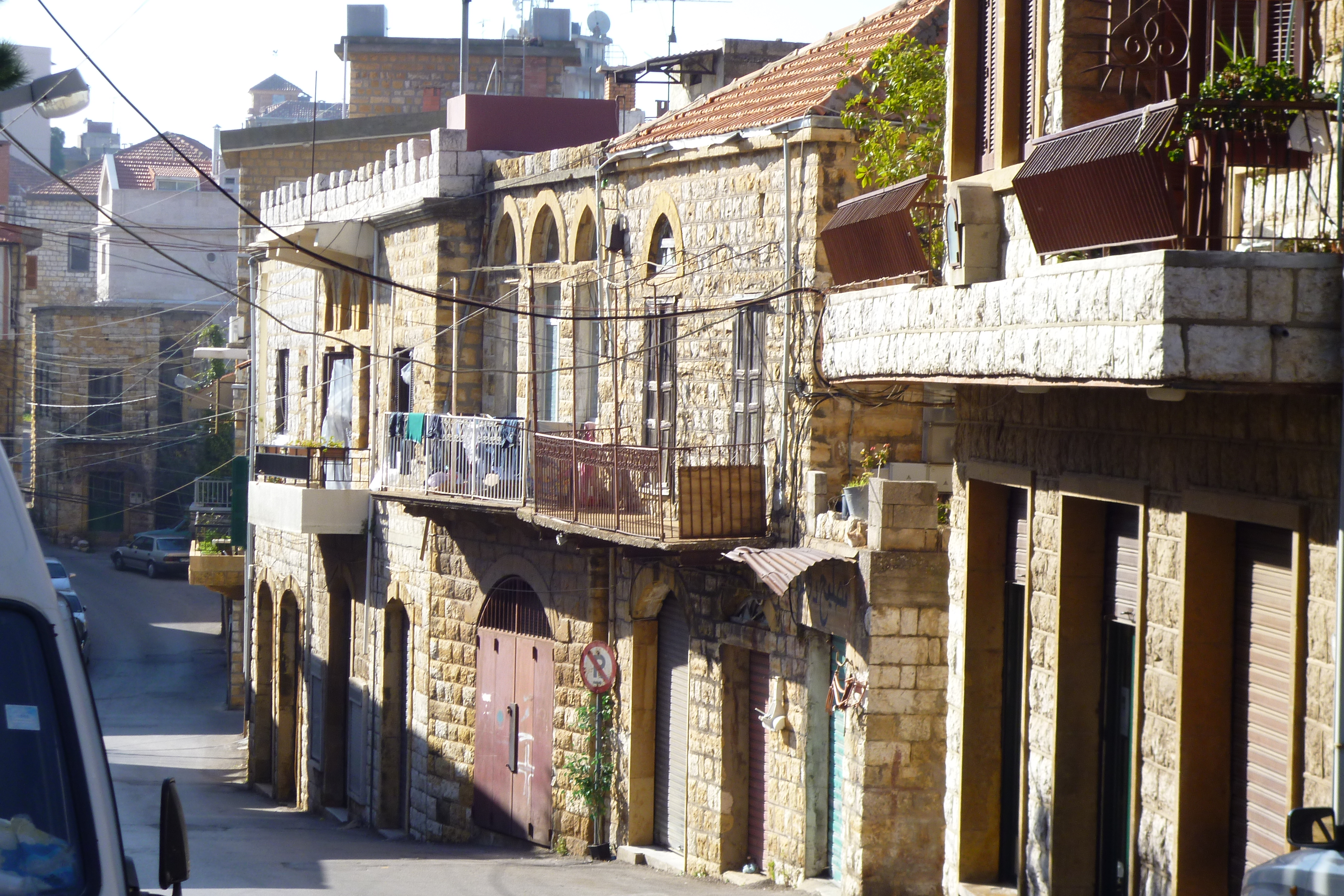
Souk

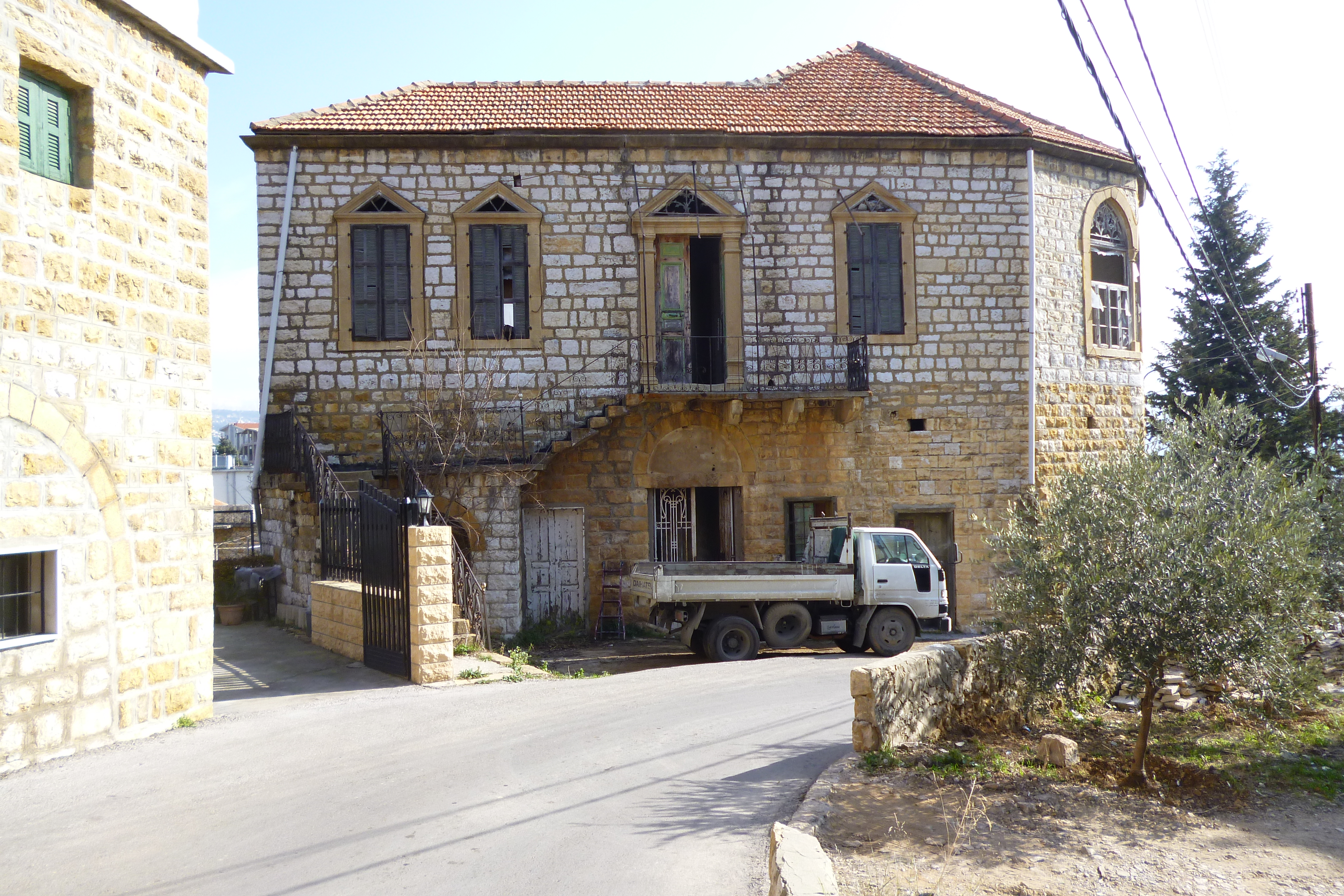
Aswad House

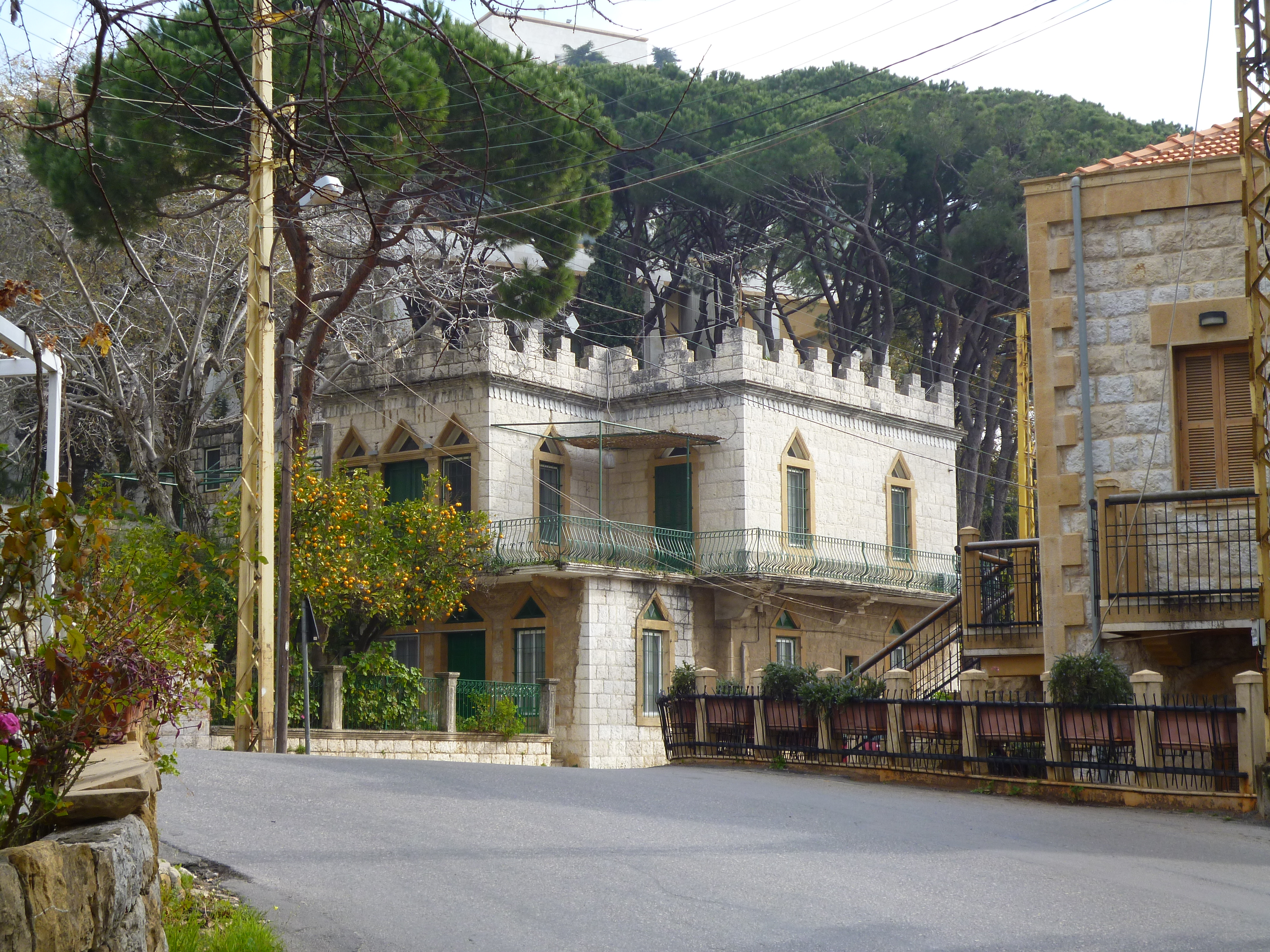
Rizk House

== Climate ==
Summer is usually dry in Brummana; it begins in early May and ends in mid-October. Summer temperature rarely exceeds 30 °C (86°F), with a lower limit of around 20 °C (68 °F). Its relative humidity in summer runs at 68%. Winter is wet and mild with temperatures ranging between 5 °C (41°F) and 18 °C (65°F), with the occasional snowfall.

== Demographics ==
The vast majority of the population in Brummana is Christian: Greek Orthodox making up 40%, Maronite Catholic making up another 40% of the population, and Greek Catholic making up 10% of the population. The rest of the population (the last 10%) is mostly Druze. The town is also the summer home of tourists from the Middle East.

== Education ==
Brummana High School was founded by the Quaker Theophilus Waldmeier in 1873. The school influenced the inhabitants of Brummana and gave the town some English traditions, such as five o’clock tea.

Waldmeier was born in 1832 in Basle, Switzerland. He attended the missionary college of St Crischona, near Basle, and went to Abyssinia as a missionary in 1858. After being among a motley assortment of Europeans held prisoner by the mad Ethiopian King Theodore and rescued in the nick of time by General Napier and his British troops at the siege of Magdala, he left in 1868 and went to Syria, settling at Beirut in connection with the British Syrian Mission founded in 1860. He re-embarked on a second career of good works. Among the fruits of that career are two of Lebanon's most vigorous institutions - Broummana High School, and Asfuriya Mental Hospital, founded in 1894.

Waldmeier moved his half-Ethiopian wife and his four children by horseback up the steep mountain path from Beirut to Brummana where he started the Friends' Syrian Mission in 1873.

In 1874, he traveled to Europe to seek financial backing from the Society of Friends. After listening to his impassioned plea for aid, some British and American Quakers formed a committee which, from that time until today, has provided support for the Broummana School.

== Broummana Soup Kitchen ==
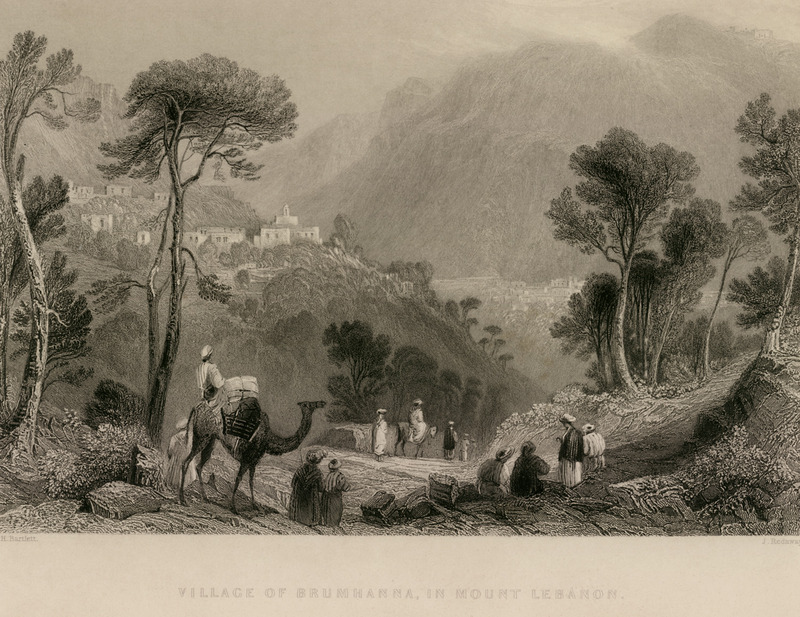
William Henry Bartlett's 1836 "Village of Brumhanna"

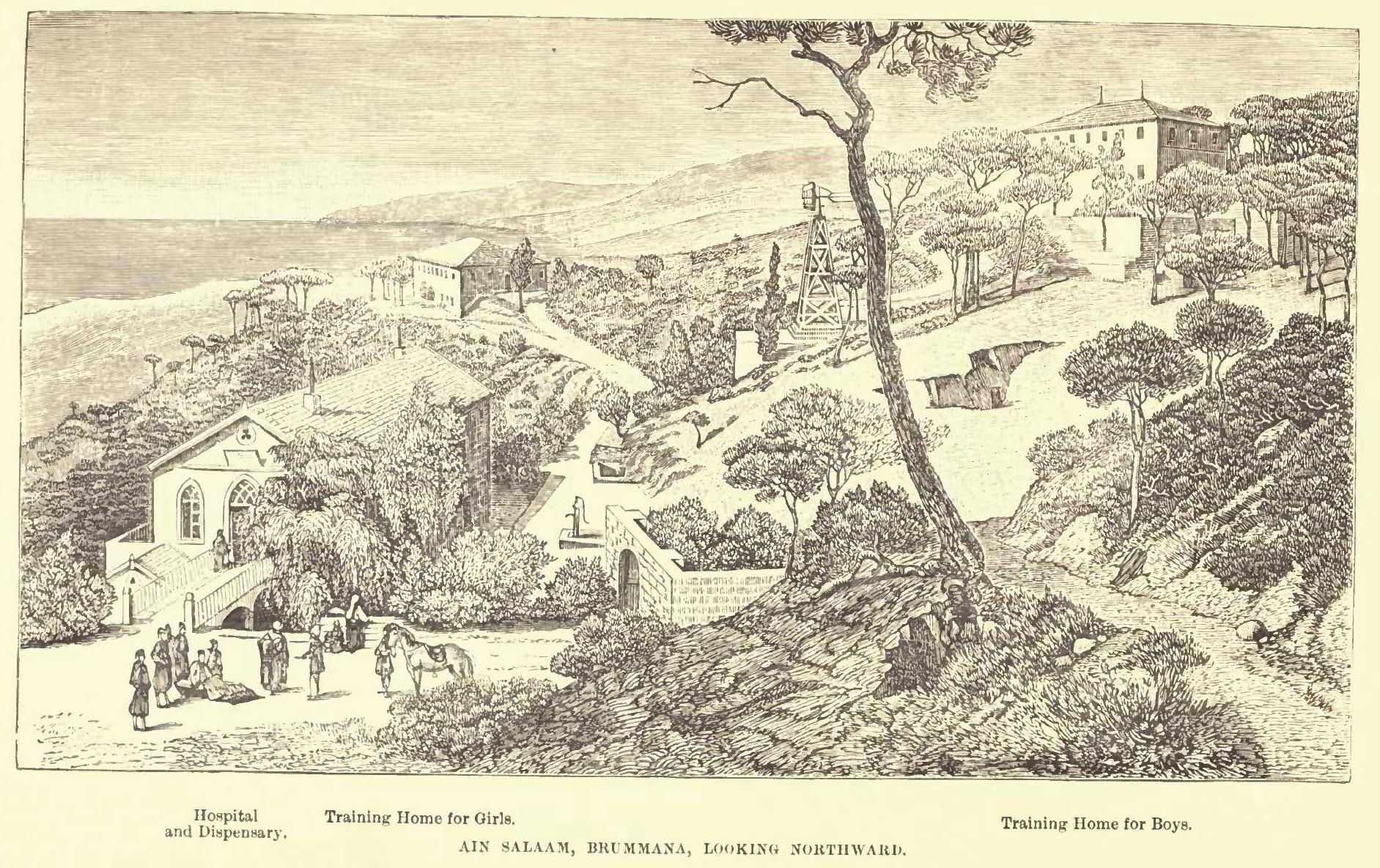
19th-century drawing of Brummana

In the summer of 1915, as the First World War gathered pace, the British imposed an economic blockage against the Ottoman territories along the eastern coast of the Mediterranean sea. The Young Turk government introduced military rule across its Arab territories and began stockpiling food for their armies. This coincided with the 1915 Ottoman Syria locust infestation across food-producing areas. In the resulting famine, which lasted two years, it is estimated that 100,000 of Mount Lebanon Mutasarrifate's 450,000 inhabitants died.

The Turkish military governor, Djemal Pasha, was a frequent resident of Brummana. Another resident was Arthur Dray, who was one of the founders of the School of Dentistry at the Syrian Protestant College in Beirut. The two men were on good terms following Dray's treatment of a bullet wound to Djemal's jaw and Dray received permission to open a small soup kitchen. The kitchen started in the summer of 1916. It employed one cook and fed 15 people. At the same time Mariam Cortas (née Asswad) and her two sisters Labibi (Mrs Amin Rizk) and Selma (Mrs Selim Rizk) were managing funds to help nursing mothers and were distributing milk and food. Mrs Cortas took over the running of the kitchen, increasing the number of daily meals to 50 in the first week and 100 in the second. The kitchen was then moved into an empty hotel that had been used by the Turkish army. By the end of 1916 the Broummana Soup Kitchen was feeding at least 1500 people a day. The project received military approval on the understanding that no males between the age of 12 and 60 were being fed. Funding came from the American Mission and a number of wealthy Syrians in Beirut. At its busiest the kitchen employed between 200 and 300 people. A visitor in October 1917 reported 1,200 people being fed, of whom 1080 were children. Despite the kitchen's success people were turned away, and the body of a woman and her child were found a few hundred yards away. Other then-major kitchens in the country were at Souk El Gharb, 'Abay, Sidon and Tripoli. After the war their work was taken over by the Syria and Palestine Relief Fund. As things returned to normal it was found that there were over 400 orphans being cared for in Brummana.

== Etymology ==
The name of the town, Brummana, stems from the Aramaic language. The name most probably means "House of Rammanu", which was an Akkadian name meaning "Thunder" used for the weather god more commonly known as Hadad in ancient Canaanite religion. (The Aramaic version of this name is Raˁmā, Syriac: ܪܥܡܐ). During classical antiquity, it was believed that Hadad lived in the area that is now Brummana, and thus the area became known as "the House of Rammanu", later corrupted to Brummana.

== Tourism ==
Brummana is one of Lebanon's main summer resorts due to its relatively cool climate. Sitting on top of a pine-forested hill, the town has views over Beirut, the Mediterranean coast, and the surrounding mountainous area. It attracts Lebanese visitors for day and weekend trips. Brummana also attracts thousands of Arab tourists from the Persian Gulf every summer, eager to escape from the hot and arid climate of the Persian Gulf. The population of Brummana rises to about 60,000 during the summer months, from a low of about 15,000 in winter, when the weather is cold and sometimes snowy.

In July 2018, Mayor Pierre Achkar, introduced a controversial plan to boost tourism by making local police women wear short shorts and red berets.

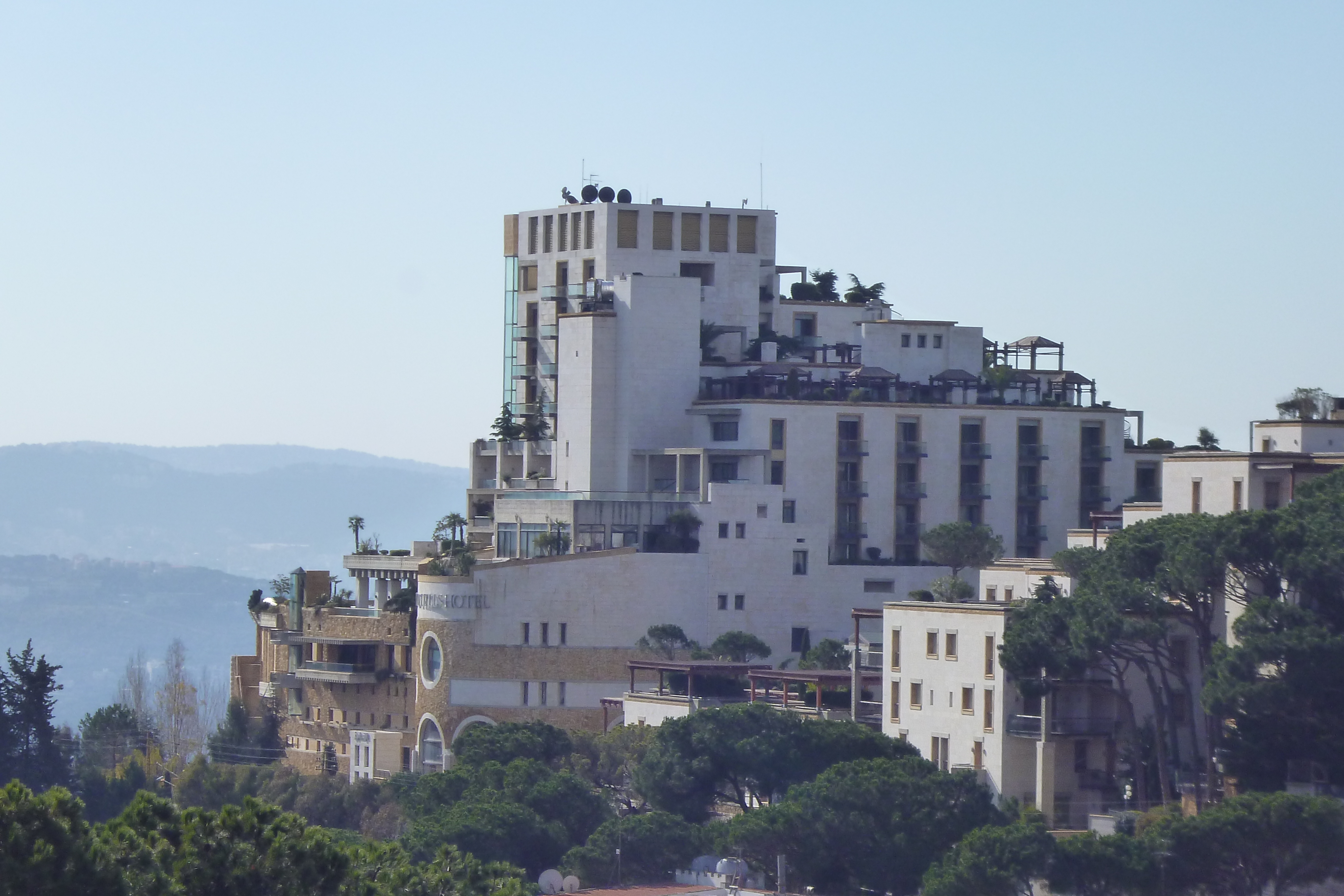
Grand Hills Hotel

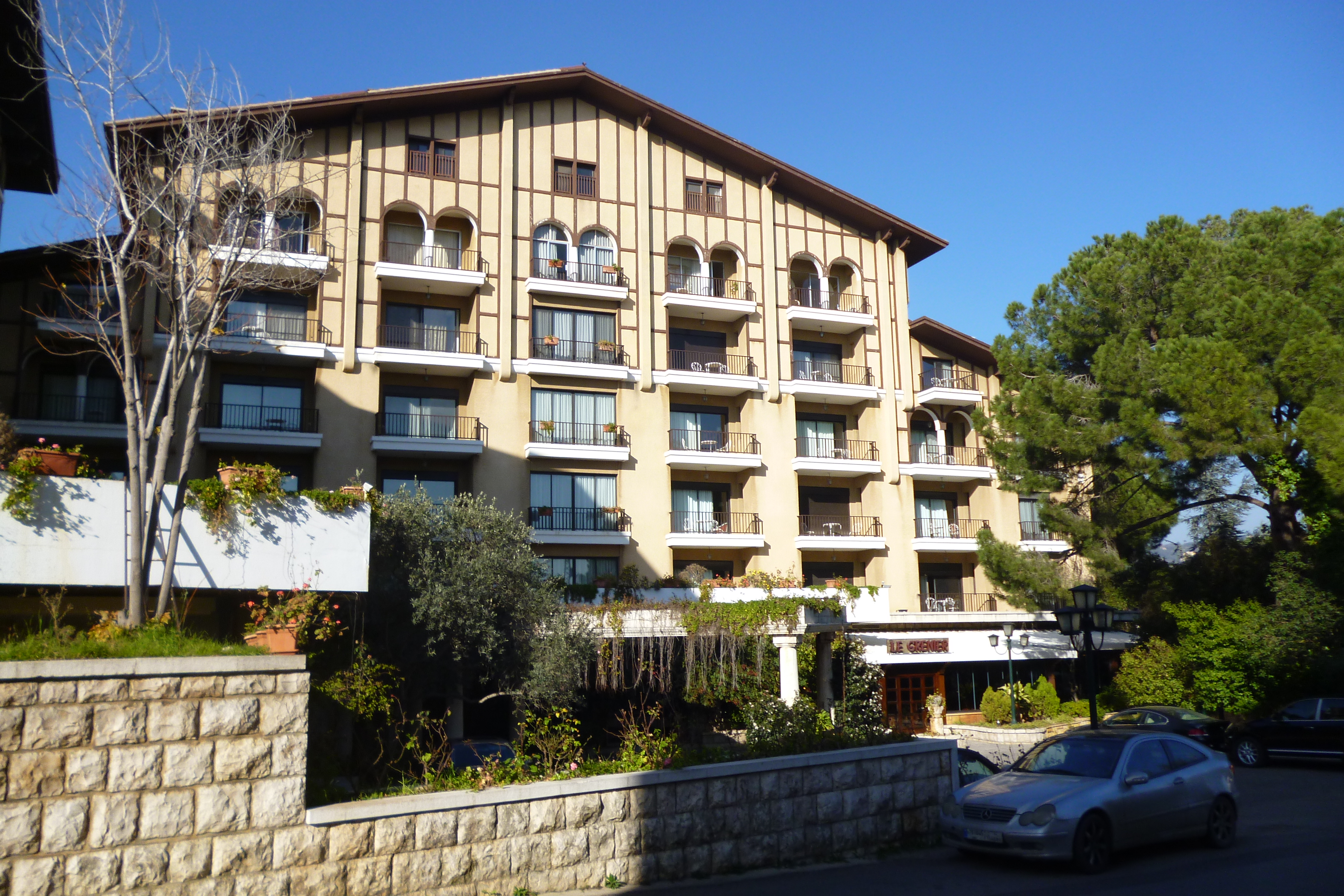
Printania Hotel

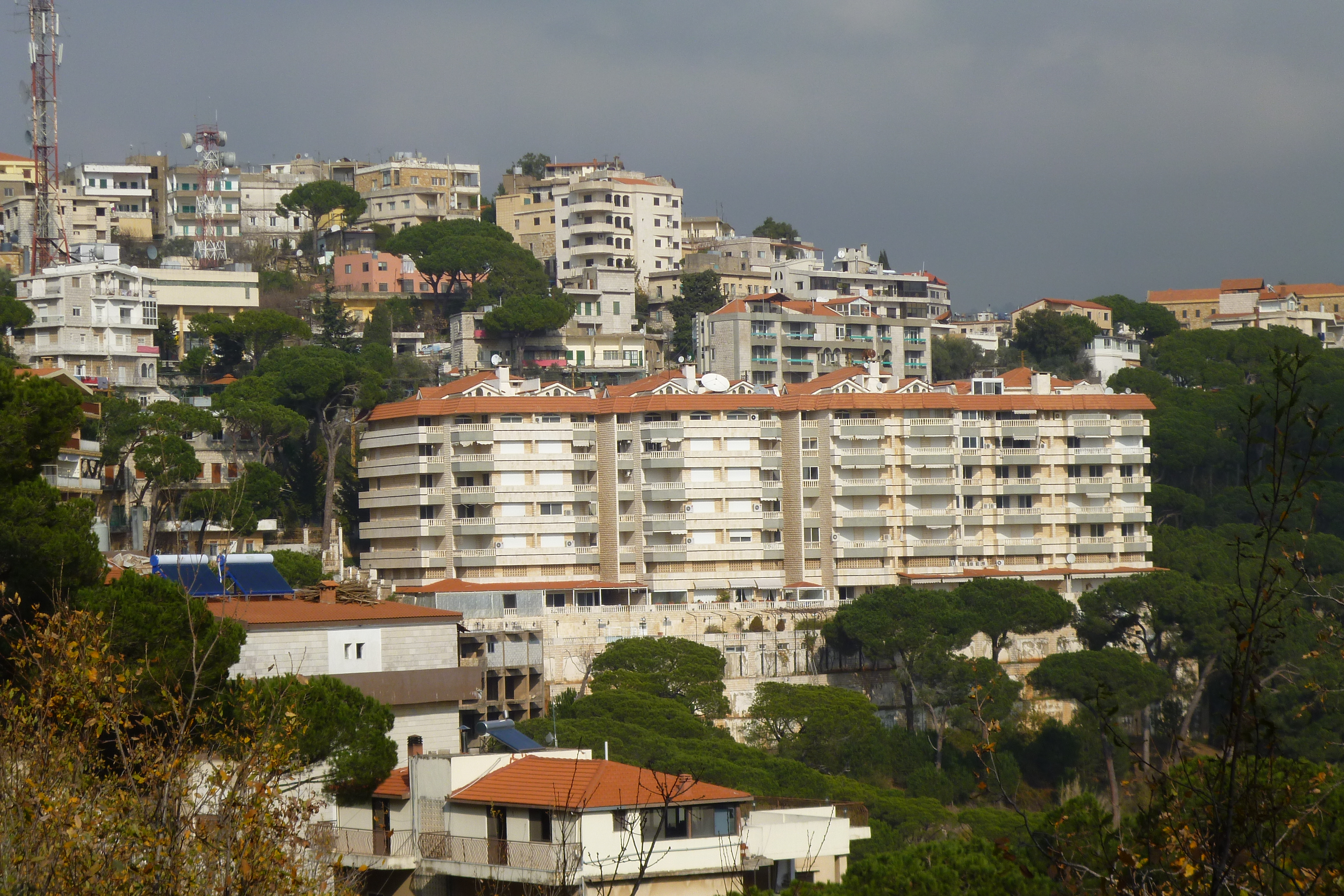
Montana Apartments

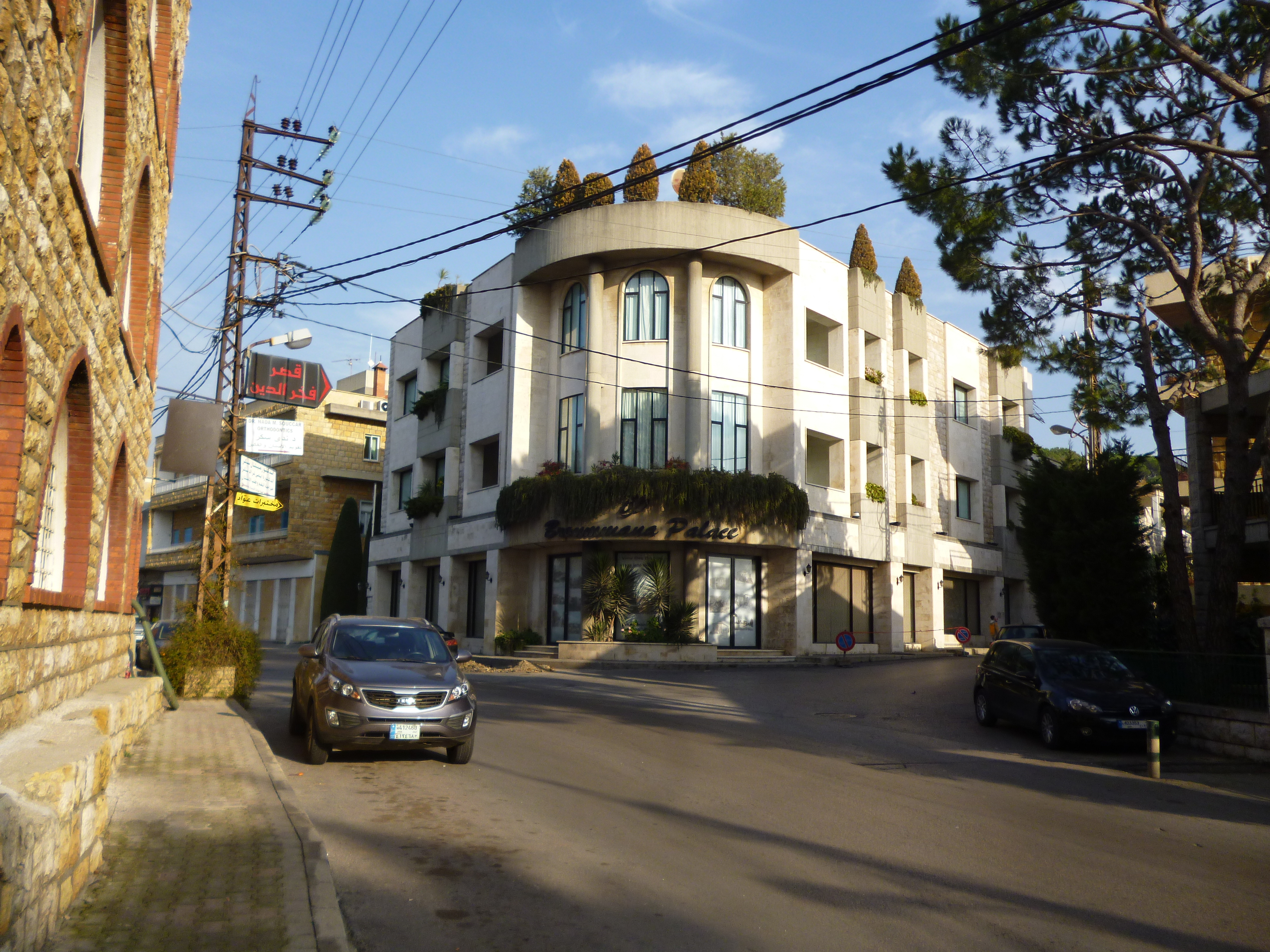
Brumana Palace Apartments

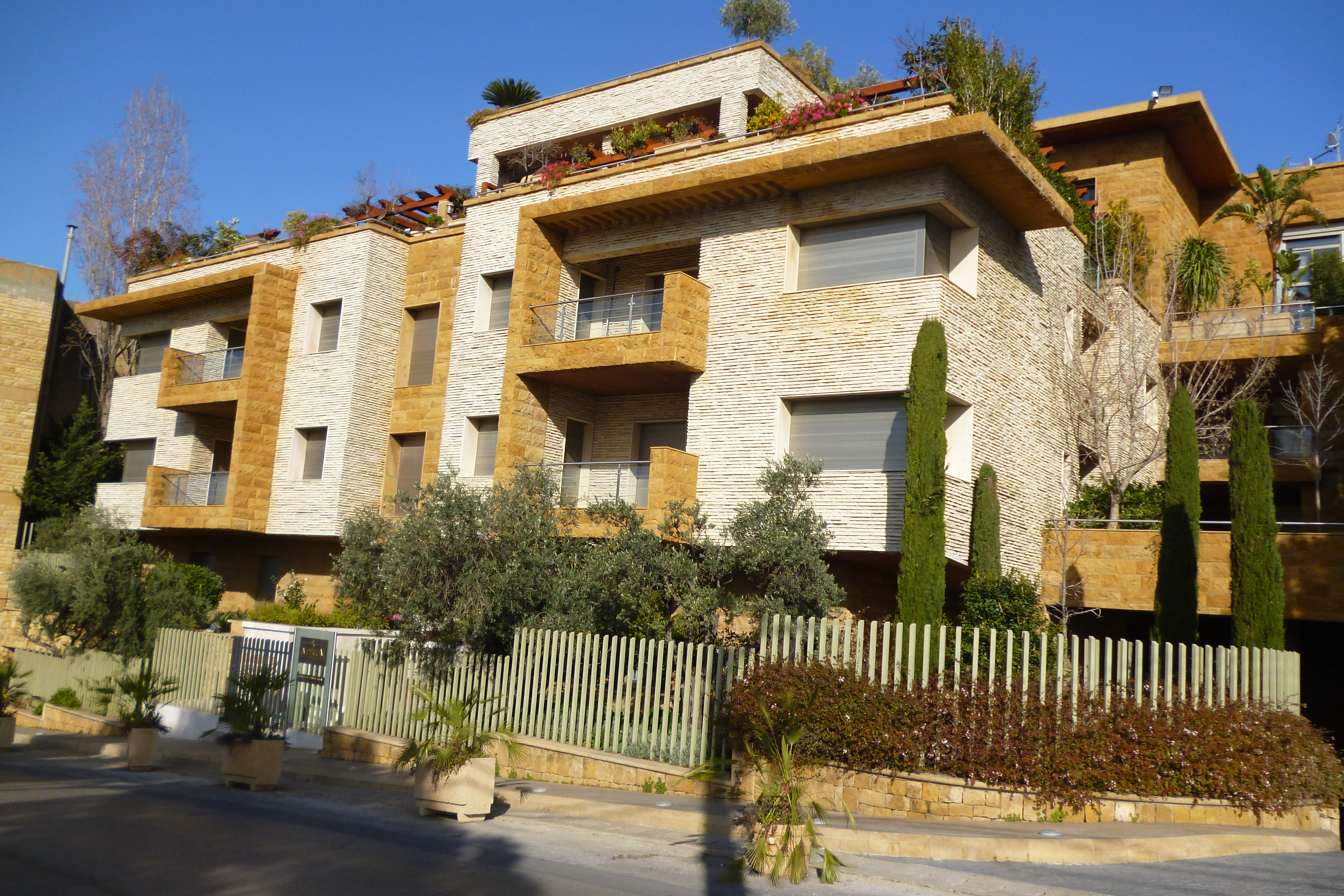
New Villa Apartments

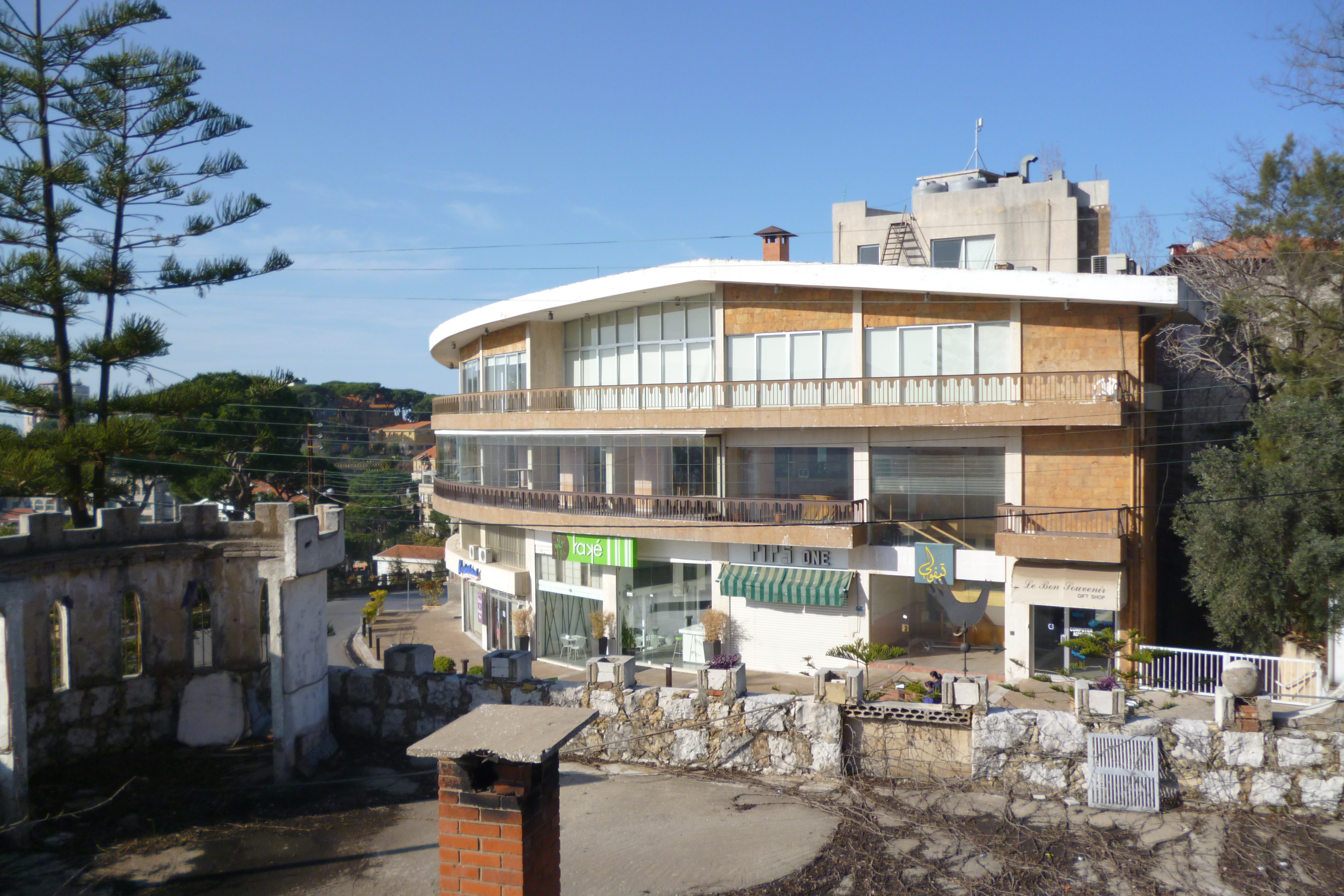
Tivoli

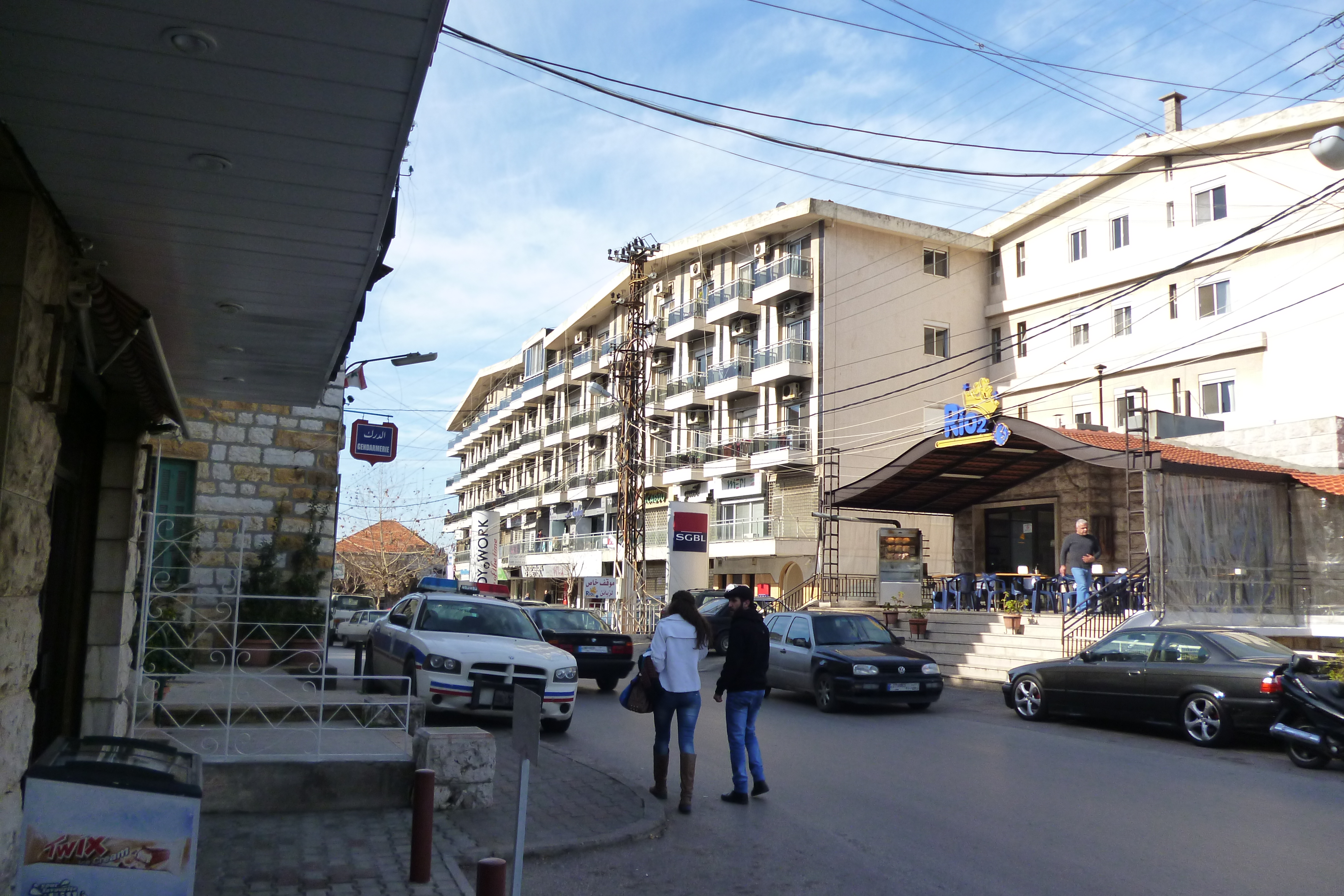
Kanaan Apartments

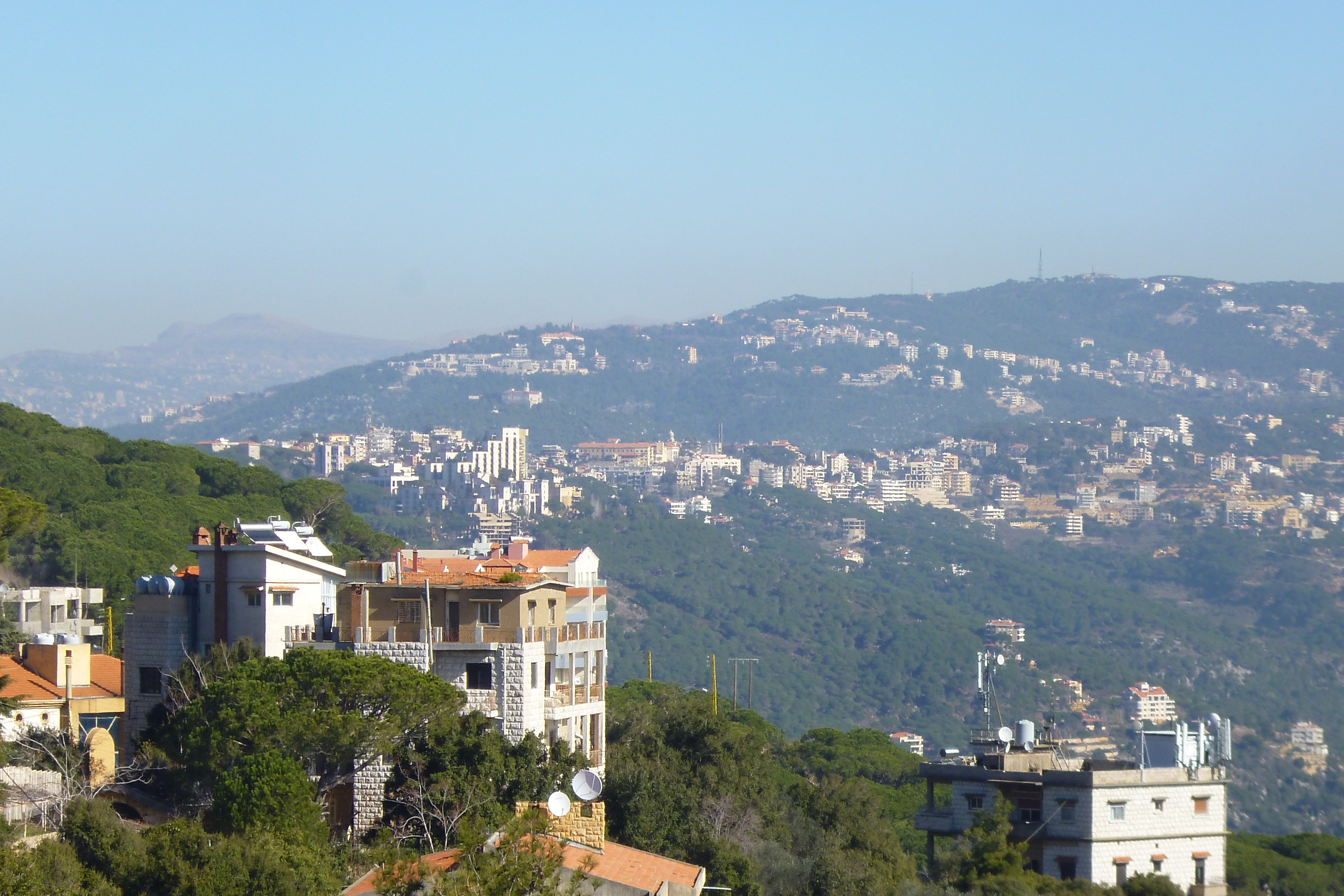
view of Brummana from Beit Meri

== In Art and Literature ==
An engraving of William Henry Bartlett's painting of the Villages of Brumhanna, in Mount Lebanon is accompanied by a posthumous poetical illustration Scene in Lebanon. by Letitia Elizabeth Landon in Fisher's Drawing Room Scrap Book, 1840.

== Places ==
Brummana has many hotels, including the Grand Hills Hotel, Broummana Hotel, Kanaan Hotel, Le Crillion, Printania Hotel, Jawhara Palace, and Garden Hotel.

It also has a number of restaurants and cafés - as well as a number of pubs and roasteries.

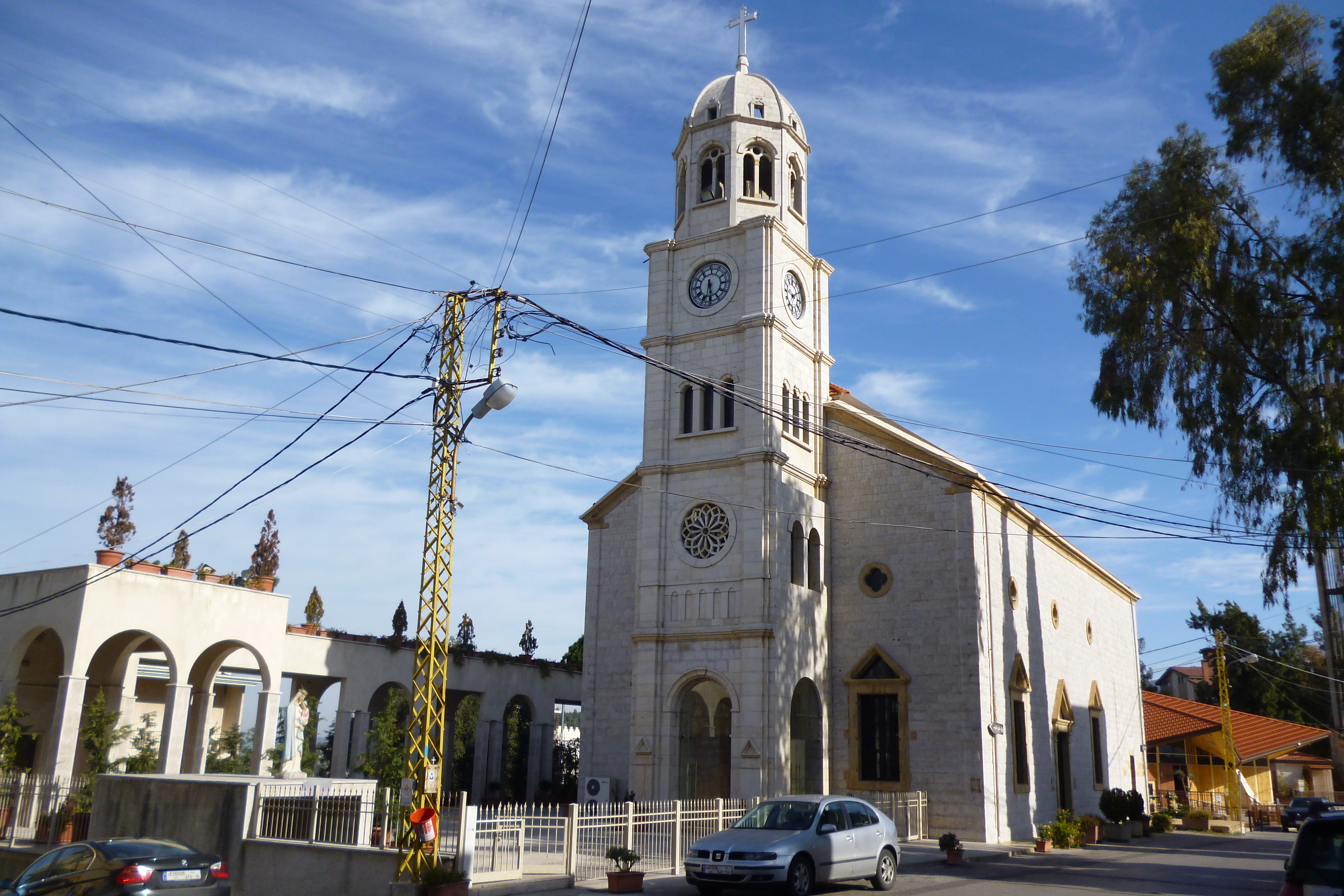
Mar Cha’aya Maronite Church

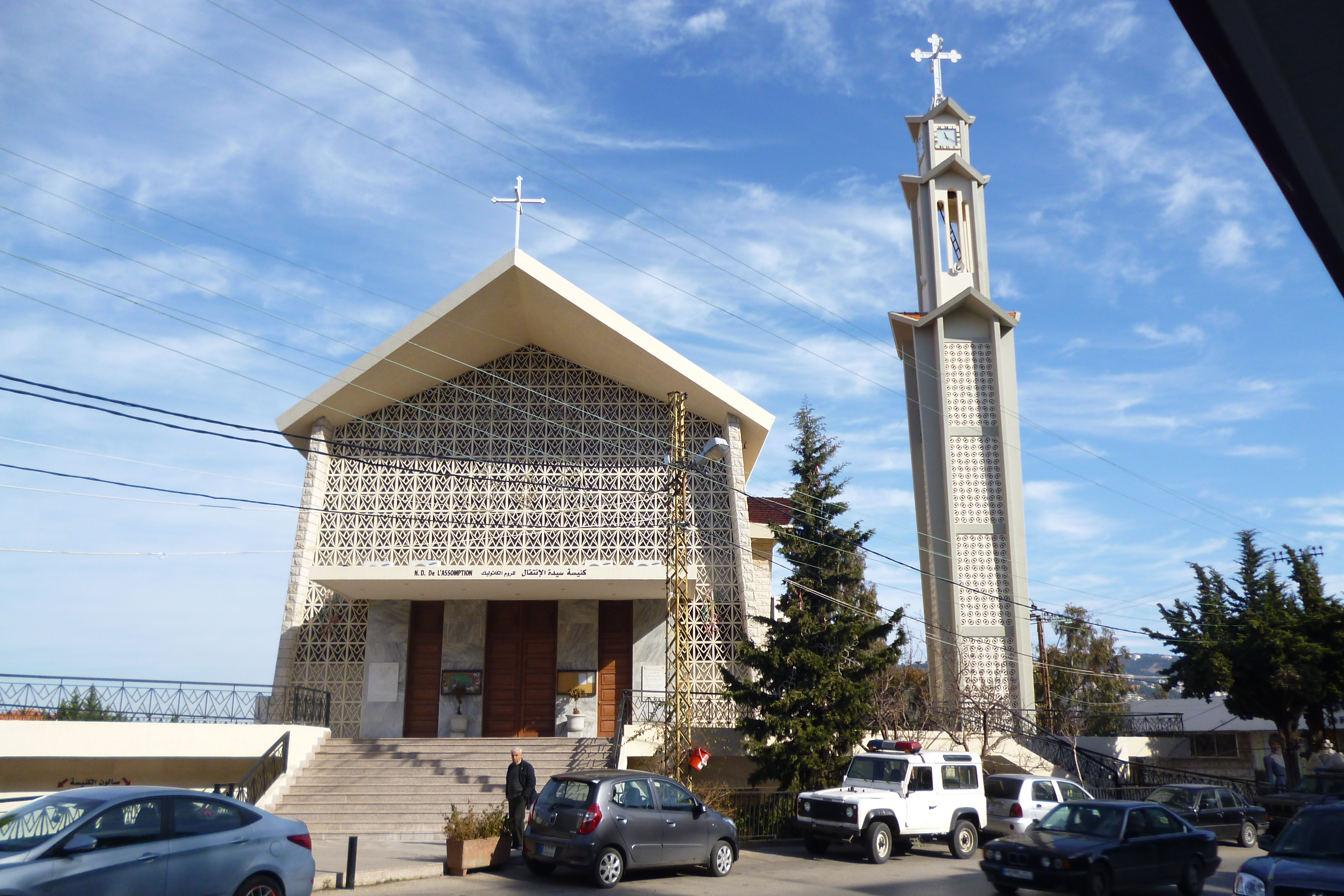
Catholic Church

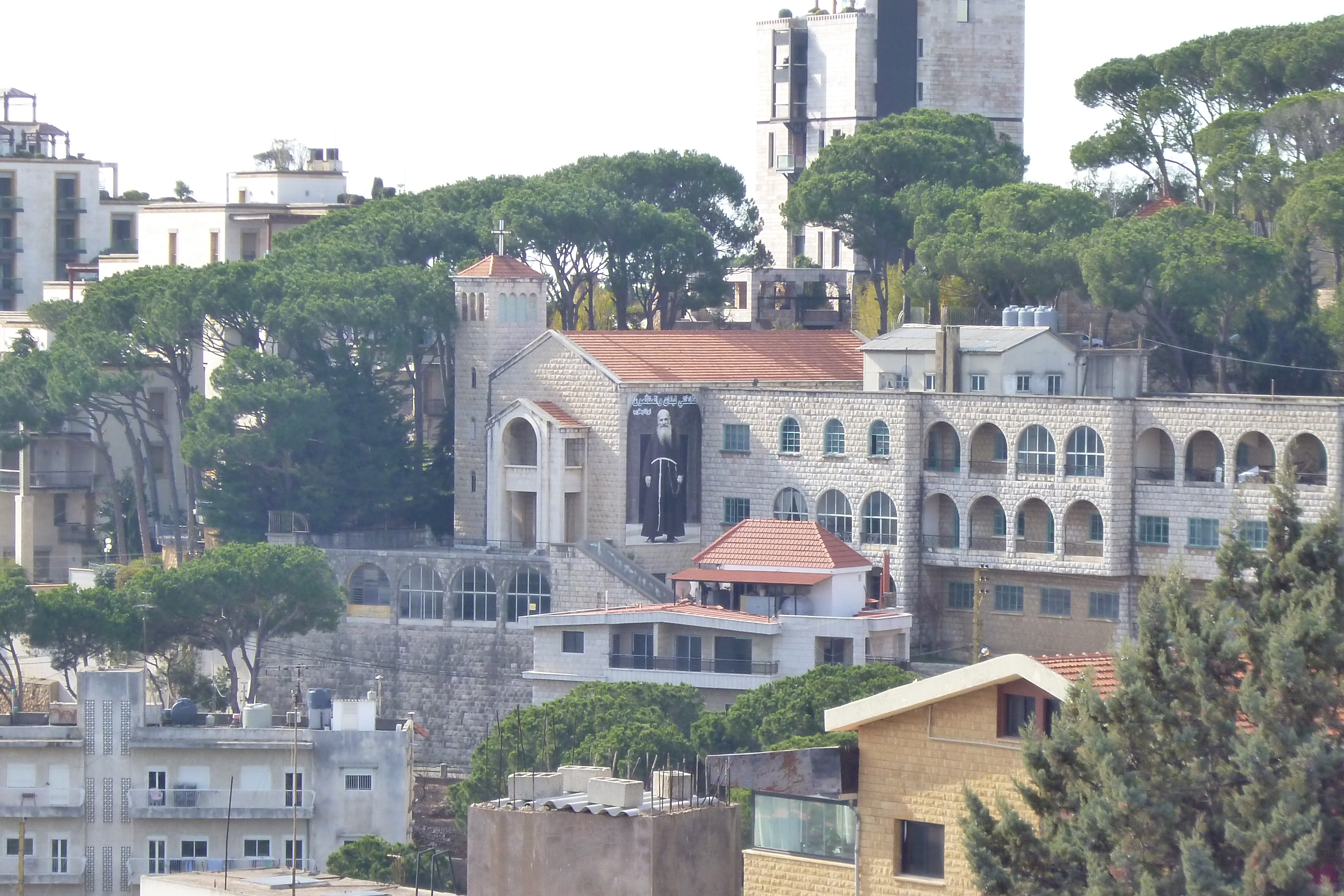
Deir el Saleeb Maronite Church

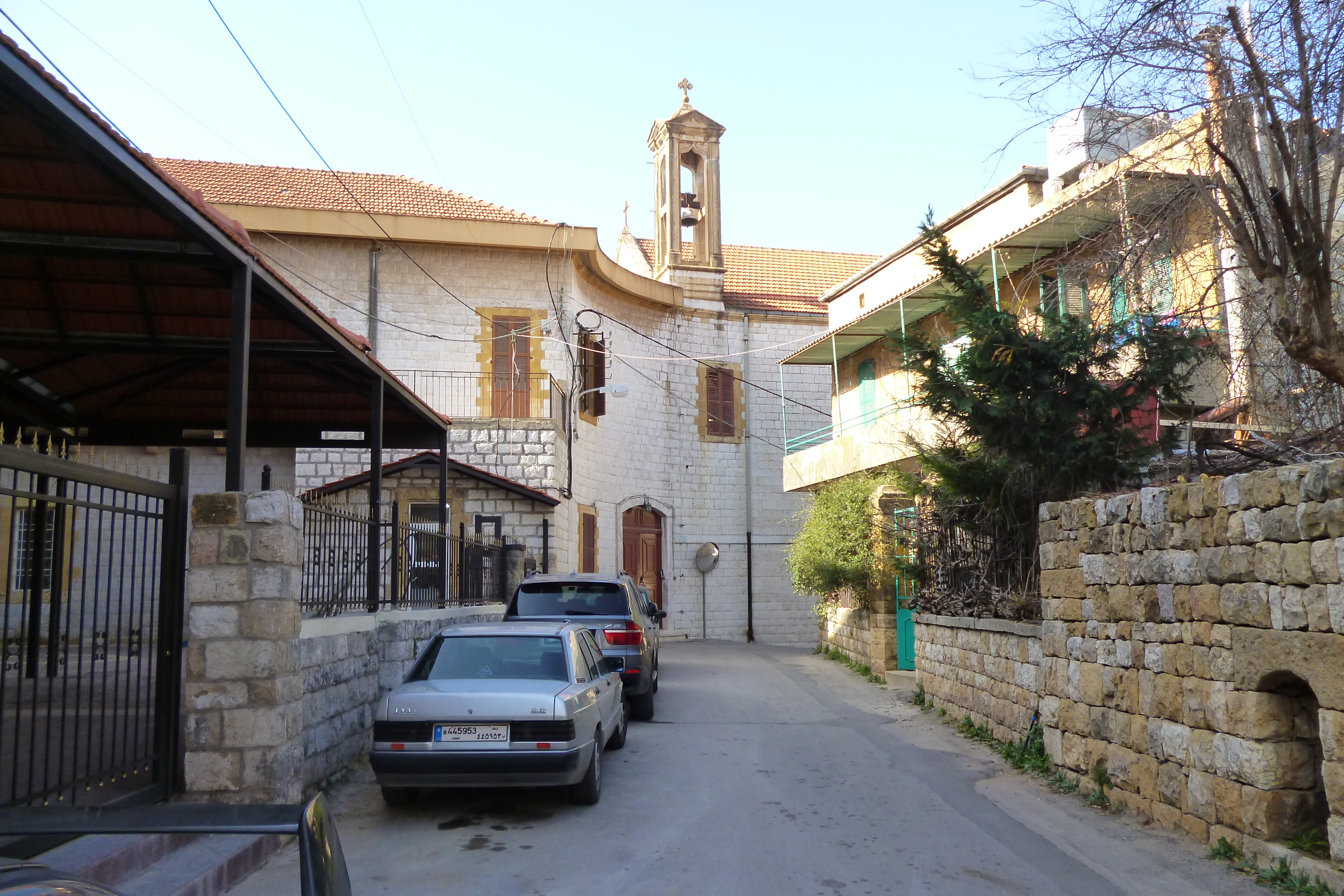
Azarieh Maronite Church

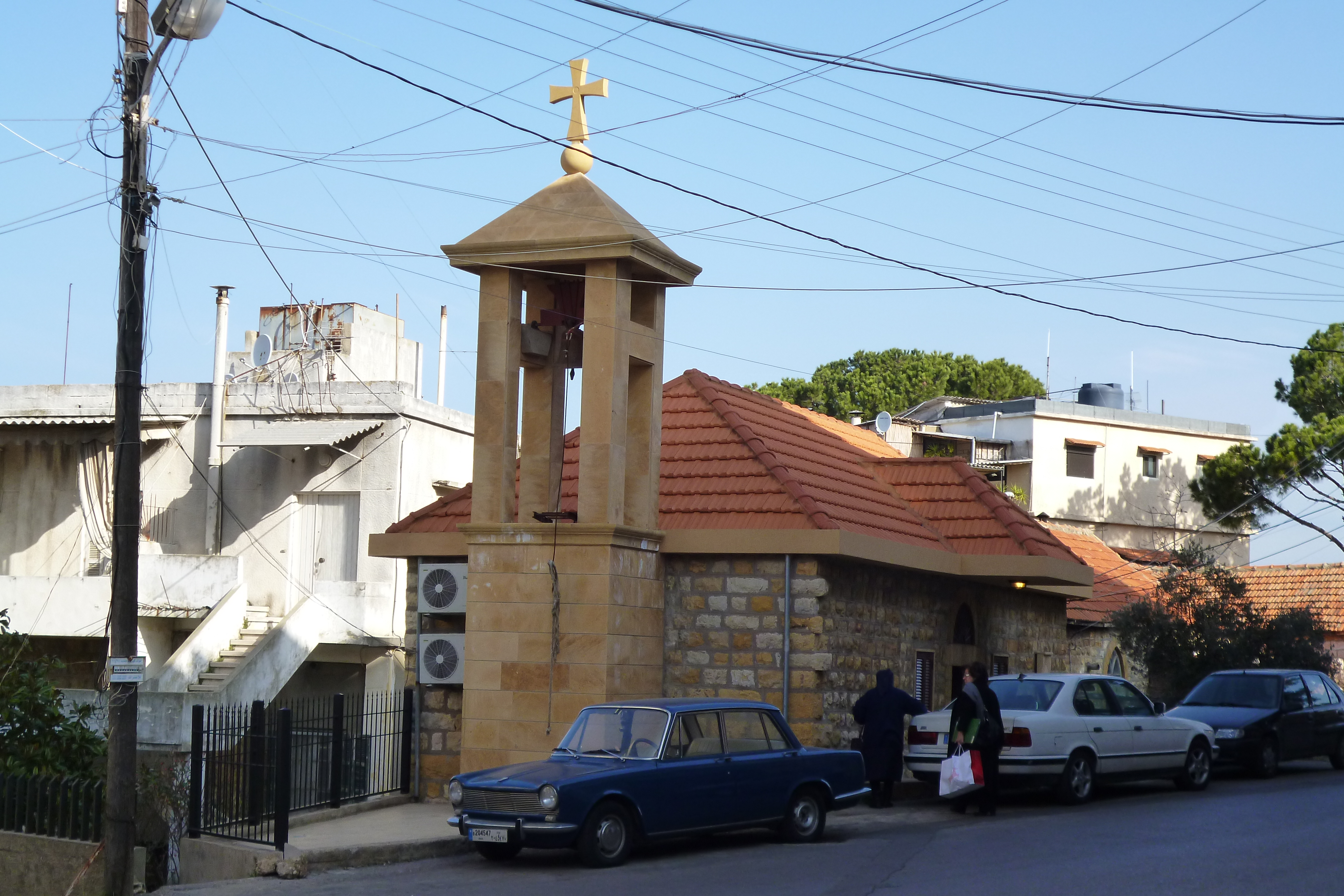
Maronite Church

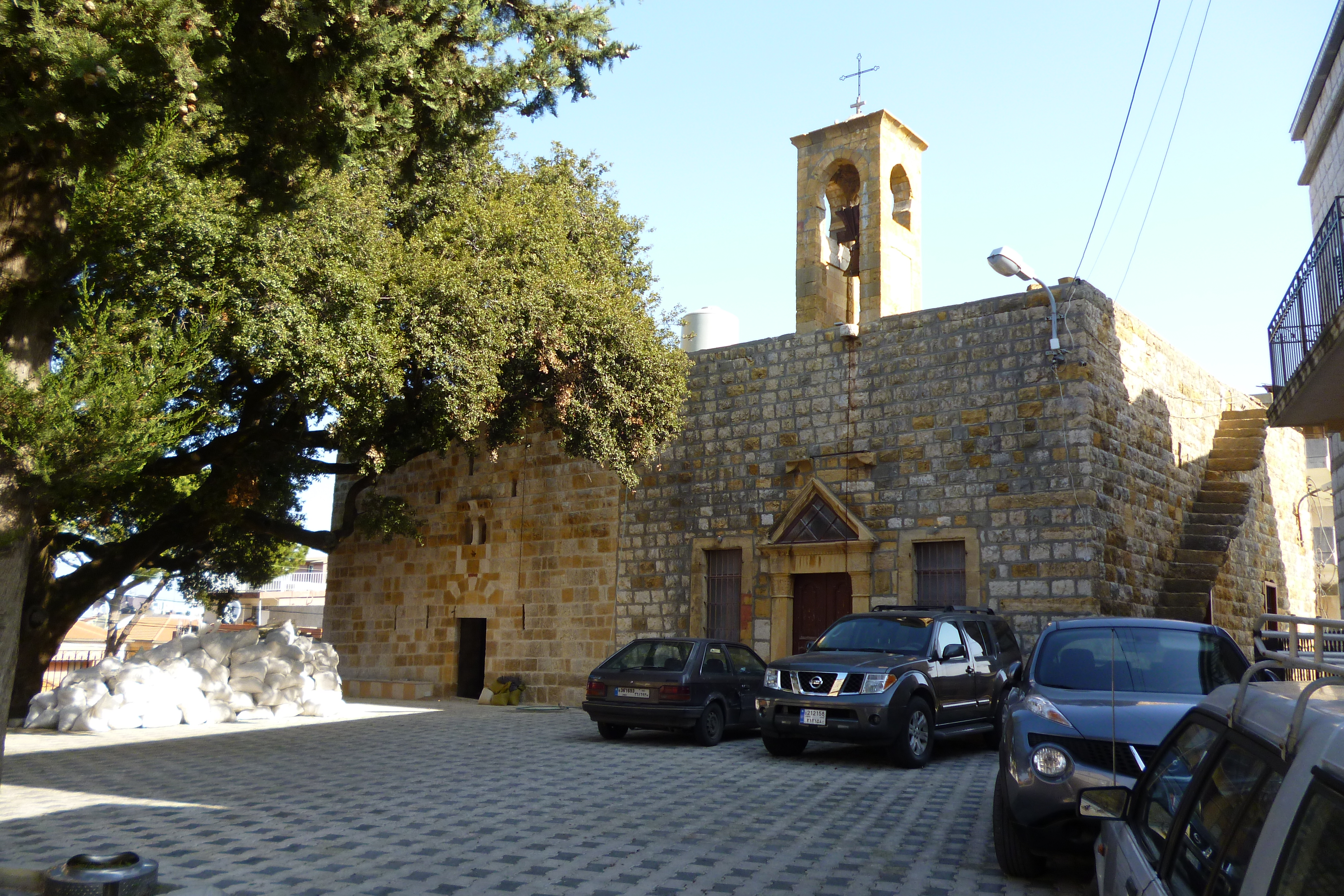
Ancient Greek Orthodox Church with Catholic Mar Cha’aya adjoining

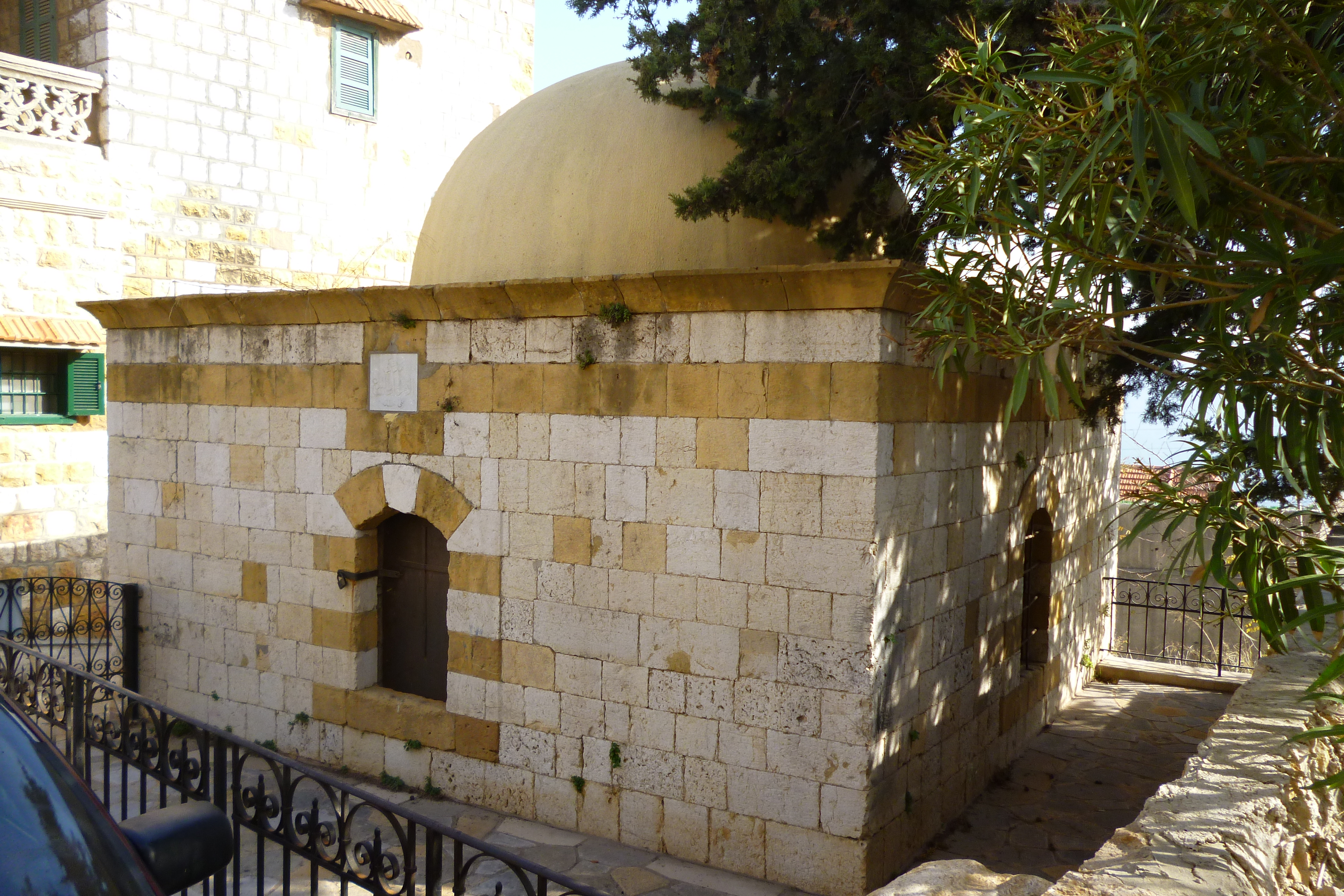
Druze tomb
