= Ralph C. Kenney =

American sports coach, athletics administrator, military officer (c. 1887 – 1966

Biographical details
- Born: c. 1887; Athens, Ohio, U.S.
- Died: February 6, 1966 (aged 78); Phoenix, Arizona, U.S.

Playing career

Football
- 1910–1911: Ohio

Basketball
- 1910–1912: Ohio

Baseball
- 1910–1911: Ohio
- Positions: Halfback, quarterback (football); Guard (basketball); Pitcher (baseball)

Coaching career (HC unless noted)

Football
- 1912: Roanoke
- 1914–1915: William & Vashti
- 1916: Hammond HS (IN)
- 1920–1923: Southwestern Presbyterian
- 1925: Louisiana Tech
- 1929: Carroll (WI) (freshmen)

Basketball
- 1914–1916: William & Vashti
- 1929–1931: Carroll (WI)
- 1925–1926: Louisiana Tech

Baseball
- 1913: Roanoke
- 1915–1916: William & Vashti
- ?–1924: Southwestern Presbyterian
- 1926: Louisiana Tech

Administrative career (AD unless noted)
- 1914–1916: William & Vashti
- c. 1922–1923: Southwestern Presbyterian
- 1925–1926: Louisiana Tech
- ?–1929: Highland Park JC
- 1929–1931: Carroll (WI)

Accomplishments and honors

Championships
- Basketball; 2 Big Four regular season (1930–1931)

Ralph Clinton Kenney (c. 1887 – February 6, 1966) was an American sports coach, athletics administrator, and military officer. He coached football, basketball, and baseball at several colleges: Roanoke College, William & Vashti College, Southwestern Presbyterian University (now known as Rhodes College), Missouri Valley College, Louisiana Polytechnic Institute (now known as Louisiana Tech University), and Carroll College (now known as Carroll University) in Waukesha, Wisconsin.

== Early life and education ==
Kenney was born in Athens, Ohio. He played college football, basketball, and baseball at Ohio University. Kenney was a veteran of World War I, during which he served with the 82nd Airborne Division, and World War II.

== Career ==
In 1914, Kenney was appointed as coach and athletic director at William & Vashti College in Aledo, Illinois. He served in that role for two years. In 1916, Kenney was hired as the football coach at Hammond High School in Hammond, Indiana.

Kenney coached at Southwestern Presbyterian University—now known as Rhodes College—during the early 1920s, and then was athletic coach and dean of the faculty at Missouri Valley College in Marshall, Missouri. In 1925, he was hired as a coach at Louisiana Polytechnic Institute—now known as Louisiana Tech University in Ruston, Louisiana. He served as the head coach for Louisiana Tech's football, men's basketball, and baseball teams for the 1925–26 academic year. He coached Louisiana Tech's football team to a record of 1–7–2. Kenney was the first basketball coach in Louisiana Tech history and led Louisiana Tech's basketball team to 7–7 record in the program's inaugural season. The Bulldogs lost the program's first two games to Centenary, but Kenney recorded Louisiana Tech's first ever basketball victory against Louisiana College. Kenney experienced the most success on the diamond leading Louisiana Tech's baseball team to a record of 17–5.

Kenney was the athletic director at Highland Park Junior College in Highland Park, Michigan before moving on in 1929 to the same role at Carroll College in Waukesha, Wisconsin. He also coached basketball at Carroll for two seasons before resigning in 1931.

== Later life and death ==
Kenney retired from military service in 1950 as a colonel in the United States Air Force. Kenney spent the last 25 years of his life in Phoenix, Arizona. He died on February 6, 1966, at Phoenix Veterans Hospital in Phoenix.

== Head coaching record ==
=== College football ===
| Year | Team | Overall | Conference | Standing | Bowl/playoffs |
|---|---|---|---|---|---|
William & Vashti (Illinois Intercollegiate Athletic Conference) (1914–1915)
| 1914 | William & Vashti | 9–1 | | | |
| 1915 | William & Vashti | 6–2 | 4–2 | | |
| William & Vashti: | | 15–3 | | | |
Louisiana Tech Bulldogs (Southern Intercollegiate Athletic Association) (1925)
| 1925 | Louisiana Tech | 1–6–2 | 1–2–1 | T–13th | |
| Louisiana Tech: | | 1–6–2 | 1–2–1 | | |
| Total: | | | | | |

=== College basketball ===
Record table
| Season | Team | Overall | Conference | Standing | Postseason |
|---|---|---|---|---|---|
Louisiana Tech Bulldogs (Southern Intercollegiate Athletic Association) (1925–1926)
| 1925–26 | Louisiana Tech | 7–7 | 5–3 | | |
| Louisiana Tech: | | 7–7 | 5–3 | | |
Carroll Pioneers (Big Four Conference) (1929–1931)
| 1929–30 | Carroll | 16–1 | 6–0 | 1st | |
| 1930–31 | Carroll | 13–3 | 5–1 | 1st | |
| Carroll: | | 29–4 | 11–1 | | |
| Total: | | | | | |
National champion Postseason invitational champion Conference regular season champion Conference regular season and conference tournament champion Division regular season champion Division regular season and conference tournament champion Conference tournament champion

=== College baseball ===
Record table
| Season | Team | Overall | Conference | Standing | Postseason |
|---|---|---|---|---|---|
Louisiana Tech Bulldogs () (1926)
| 1926 | Louisiana Tech | 17–5 | | | |
| Louisiana Tech: | | 17–5 | | | |
| Total: | | | | | |
