= Highland Park, Michigan =

City in Michigan, United States

- City
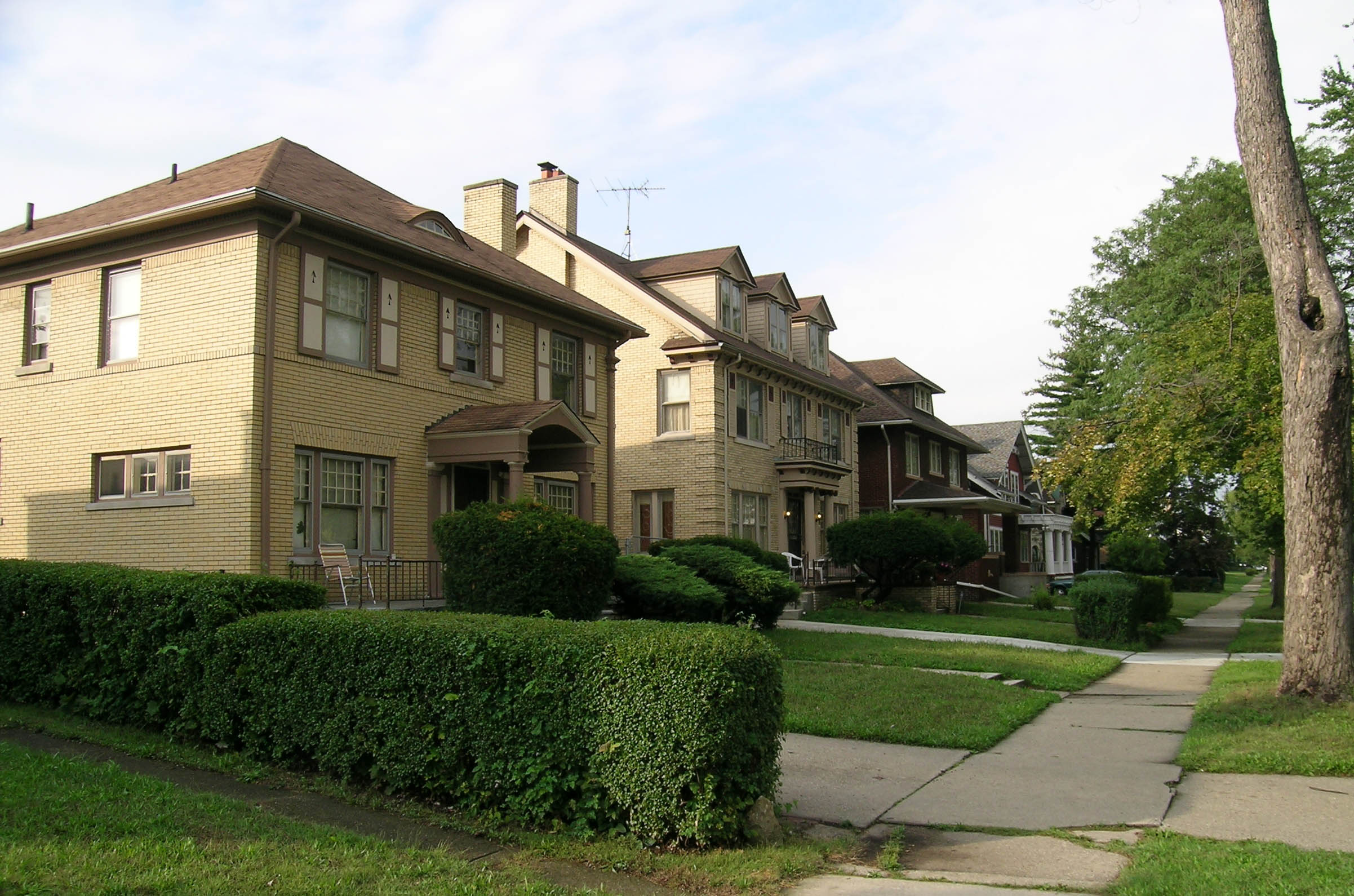
- Medbury's–Grove Lawn Subdivisions Historic District along Puritan Avenue

- Seal

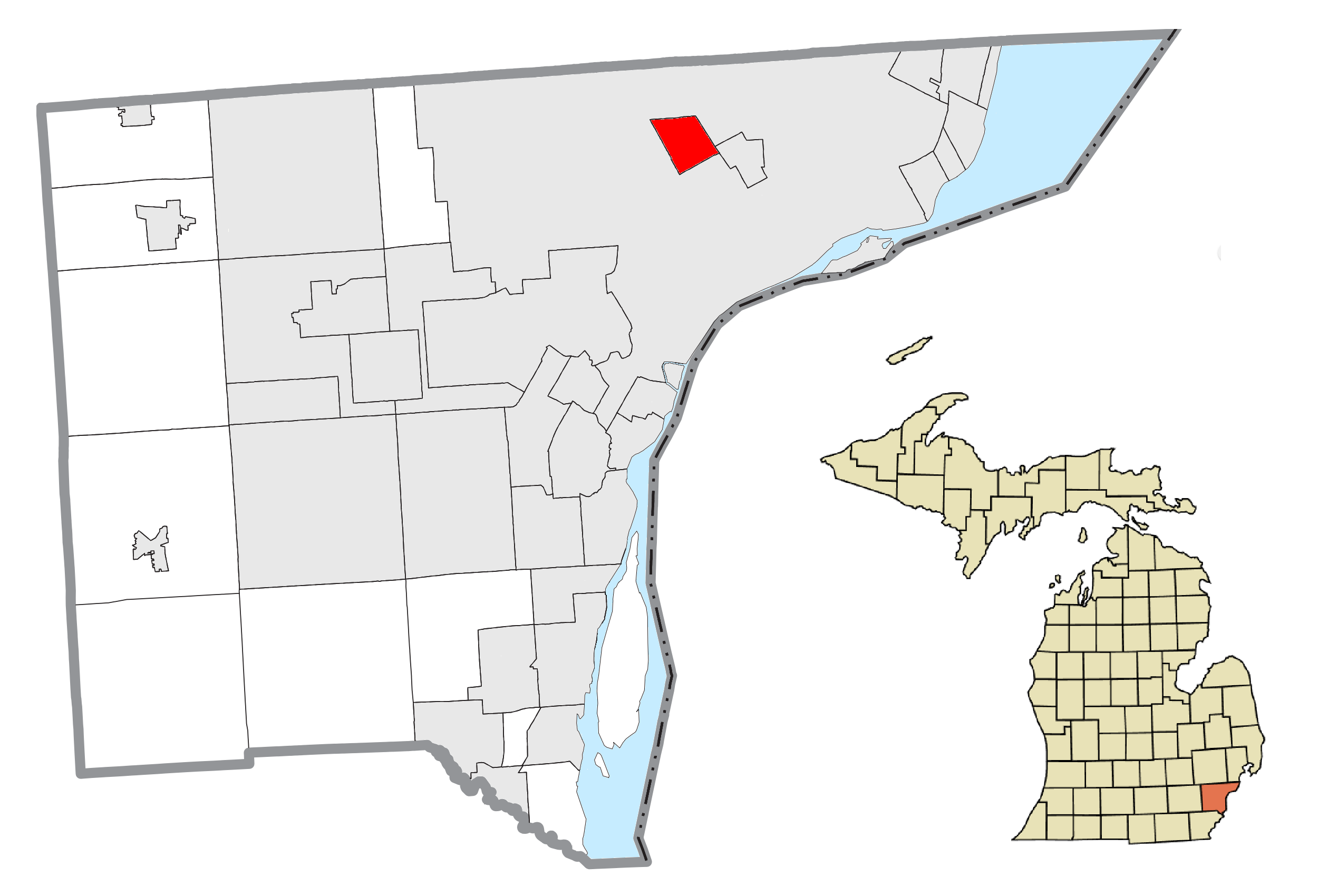
- Location of Highland Park in Wayne County, Michigan
- Coordinates: 42°24′20″N 83°05′49″W
- Country: United States
- State: Michigan
- County: Wayne
- Incorporated (village): 1889
- Incorporated (city): 1918

Government
  - Type: Mayor–council
  - Mayor: Glenda McDonald

Area
  - Total: 2.971 sq mi (7.695 km^{2})
  - Land: 2.971 sq mi (7.695 km^{2})
  - Water: 0 sq mi (0.000 km^{2})
- Elevation: 636 ft (194 m)

Population (2020)
  - Total: 8,977
  - Estimate (2025): 8,248
  - Density: 2,840/sq mi (1,097/km^{2})
- Time zone: UTC−5 (Eastern (EST))
  - Summer (DST): UTC−4 (EDT)
- ZIP Code: 48203
- Area code: 313
- FIPS code: 26-38180
- GNIS feature ID: 0628251
- Sales tax: 6.0%
- Website: highlandparkmi.gov

Highland Park is a city in Wayne County in the U.S. state of Michigan. An enclave of Detroit, Highland Park is located roughly 6 miles (9.7 km) north of Downtown Detroit and is surrounded by Detroit on most sides. As of the 2020 census, the city had a population of 8,977.

== History ==
The area that became Highland Park began was a small farming community on a large ridge at what is now Woodward Avenue and Highland, six miles (9.7 km) north of Detroit. In 1818, prominent Detroit judge Augustus B. Woodward bought the ridge, and platted the village of Woodwardville in 1825. The development of the village failed. Another Detroit judge, Benjamin F. H. Witherell, son of Michigan Supreme Court justice James Witherell, attempted to found a village platted as Cassandra on this site in 1836, but this plan also failed.

By 1860, the settlement was given a post office under the name of Whitewood. After a succession of closures and reopenings of the rural post office, the settlement was finally incorporated as a village within Greenfield Township and Hamtramck Township under the name of Highland Park in 1889.

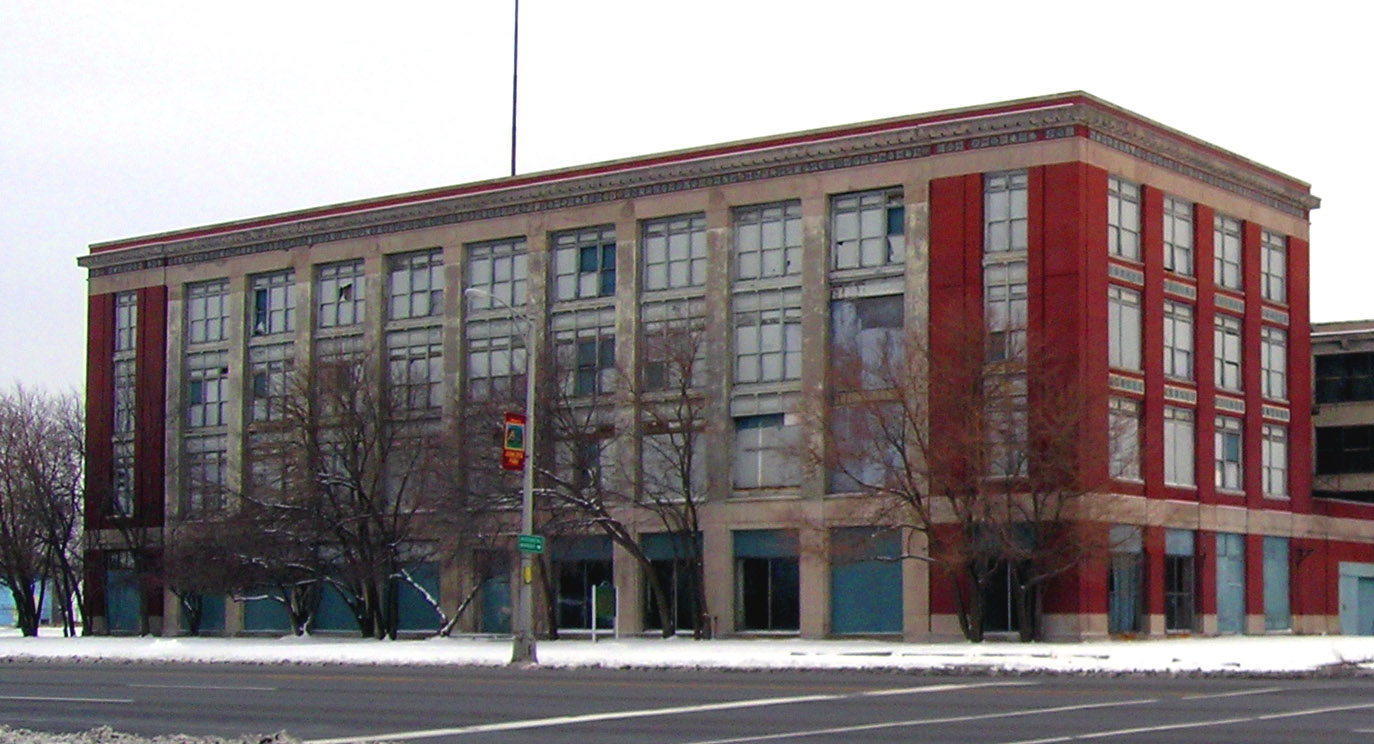
Highland Park Ford Plant

In 1907, Henry Ford purchased 160 acres (65 ha) just north of Manchester Street between Woodward Avenue and Oakland Street to build an automobile plant. Construction of the Highland Park Ford Plant was completed in 1909, and the area's population dramatically increased in 1913, when Henry Ford opened the plant's first assembly line. The village of Highland Park was incorporated as a city in 1918 to protect its tax base, including its successful Ford plant, from Detroit's expanding boundaries.

In 1910, Highland Park, then a village, had 4,120 residents. Between 1910 and 1920 during the boom associated with the automobile industry, Highland Park's population grew to about 46,500, reaching its peak around 1927. The growth of Highland Park and neighboring Hamtramck broke records for increases of population; both municipalities withstood annexation efforts from Detroit. In 1925, Chrysler Corporation was founded in Highland Park. It purchased the city's Brush-Maxwell plant, which would eventually expand to 150 acres and serve as the site of the company's headquarters for the next 70 years.

Arthur Lupp of Highland Park founded the Michigan branch of the Black Legion in 1931; it was a secret vigilante group related to the Ku Klux Klan, which had been prominent in Detroit in the 1920s. The Legion had a similar nativist bent and its members were opposed to immigrants, Catholics, Jews, blacks, and labor organizers. Many public and business officials of Highland Park, including the chief of police, a mayor, and a city councilman, joined this group. Lupp and others were among the 48 men indicted and convicted following the murder of Charles Poole in May 1936; eleven were convicted in that murder. Investigations revealed the Legion had been involved in many other murders or conspiracies to murder during the previous three years, for which another 37 men were convicted. These convictions ended the reign of the Legion.

In 1944, the Davison Freeway was opened as the country's first modern depressed urban freeway, running through the center of the city. It was completely reconstructed and widened in 1996 and 1997 to improve its safety.

=== Decline ===
Ford Motor Company demolished large sections of its Highland Park plant in the late 1950s. With the loss of industrial jobs, the city suffered many of the same difficulties as Detroit: declines in population and tax base accompanied by an increase in street crime. White flight from the city accelerated after the 1967 Detroit 12th Street Riot. Ford's last operation at the factory, the production of tractors at its Model T plant, was discontinued in 1973, and in 1981 the entire property was sold to a private developer for general industrial usage. The city population was majority black and impoverished by the 1980s. Chrysler, the city's last major private sector employer, moved its corporate headquarters from Highland Park to Auburn Hills between 1991 and 1993, paying the city $44 million in compensation. The move dislocated a total of 6,000 jobs over this period.

On June 19, 1982, drafter Vincent Chin was beaten to death in Highland Park by two automotive workers in retaliation for Japan's success in the automotive industry. The killing was considered a racially motivated hate crime.

Known as "The City of Trees", the town was thickly forested until the 1970s. The spread of Dutch elm disease required many old trees to be cut down.

From 2001 to 2009, the city was controlled by an emergency financial manager appointed by the State of Michigan due to mounting financial stress.

In August 2011, more than two-thirds of the street lights in Highland Park's residential neighborhoods and alleys were removed by the city, due to an inability to pay a $60,000 per month electric bill. The street lights were not only turned off, but decommissioned, or removed from their posts. The city advised residents to keep porch lights on to deter crime. The following year, a local 501(c)(3) nonprofit organization, Soulardarity, was formed to restore streetlighting to the city's residential neighborhoods and alleyways in the form of solar street lights.

On November 20, 2013, the Detroit Water and Sewerage Department filed a lawsuit against the City of Highland Park regarding unpaid sewage services and water totaling $17.7 million. In 2020, the two cities settled out of court for an unspecified amount.

== Geography ==
According to the United States Census Bureau, the city has an area of 2.971 square miles (7.69 km^{2}), all land.

Highland Park is approximately 6 miles (10 km) north-northwest from Downtown Detroit. It is bounded by McNichols Road (6 Mile Road) to the north, Grand Trunk Western Railroad Holly Subdivision tracks to the east, the alleys of Tuxedo and Tennyson streets to the south, and the Lodge Freeway and Thompson Street to the west.

== Demographics ==
Historical population
Census	Pop.	Note	%±
1900	427		—
1910	4,120		864.9%
1920	46,499		1,028.6%
1930	52,959		13.9%
1940	50,810		−4.1%
1950	46,393		−8.7%
1960	38,063		−18.0%
1970	35,444		−6.9%
1980	27,909		−21.3%
1990	20,121		−27.9%
2000	16,746		−16.8%
2010	11,776		−29.7%
2020	8,977		−23.8%
2025 (est.)	8,248		−8.1%
U.S. Decennial Census; 2020 Census

=== Racial and ethnic composition ===
Highland Park city, Michigan – Racial and ethnic composition Note: the US Census treats Hispanic/Latino as an ethnic category. This table excludes Latinos from the racial categories and assigns them to a separate category. Hispanics/Latinos may be of any race.
Race / Ethnicity (NH = Non-Hispanic)	Pop 1980	Pop 1990	Pop 2000	Pop 2010	Pop 2020	% 1980	% 1990	% 2000	% 2010	% 2020
White alone (NH)	3,937	1,271	668	347	484	14.11%	6.32%	3.99%	2.95%	5.39%
Black or African American alone (NH)	23,300	18,594	15,598	10,955	7,876	83.49%	92.41%	93.14%	93.03%	87.74%
Native American or Alaska Native alone (NH)	86	33	39	26	34	0.31%	0.16%	0.23%	0.22%	0.38%
Asian alone (NH)	113	50	41	46	47	0.40%	0.25%	0.24%	0.39%	0.52%
Native Hawaiian or Pacific Islander alone (NH)	28	N/A	3	3	3	0.10%	N/A	0.02%	0.03%	0.03%
Other race alone (NH)	213	36	29	14	46	0.76%	0.18%	0.17%	0.12%	0.51%
Mixed race or Multiracial (NH)	N/A	N/A	273	229	312	N/A	N/A	1.63%	1.94%	3.48%
Hispanic or Latino (any race)	232	137	95	156	175	0.83%	0.68%	0.57%	1.32%	1.95%
Total	27,909	20,121	16,746	11,776	8,977	100.00%	100.00%	100.00%	100.00%	100.00%

=== 2020 census ===
As of the 2020 census, there were 8,977 people, 3,917 households, and 1,845 families residing in the city.

The population density was 3,021.5 inhabitants per square mile (1,166.6/km^{2}). There were 5,137 housing units.

The median age was 41.4 years. 21.2% of residents were under the age of 18, including 5.0% under age 5, and 18.9% were 65 years of age or older. For every 100 females there were 95.2 males, and for every 100 females age 18 and over there were 92.0 males.

100.0% of residents lived in urban areas, while 0.0% lived in rural areas.

Of the city's 3,917 households, 25.0% had children under the age of 18 living in them. Of all households, 11.4% were married-couple households, 31.9% were households with a male householder and no spouse or partner present, and 50.3% were households with a female householder and no spouse or partner present. About 46.7% of all households were made up of individuals, and 19.7% had someone living alone who was 65 years of age or older.

Of the 5,137 housing units, 23.7% were vacant. The homeowner vacancy rate was 3.1% and the rental vacancy rate was 11.4%.

=== 2010 census ===
As of the 2010 census, there were 11,776 people, 4,645 households, and 2,406 families residing in the city. The population density was 3,963.9 inhabitants per square mile (1,530.5/km^{2}). There were 6,090 housing units at an average density of 2,050.5 per square mile (791.7/km^{2}). The racial makeup was 3.2% White, 93.5% African American, 0.3% Native American, 0.4% Asian, 0.4% from other races, and 2.3% from two or more races. Hispanic or Latino of any race were 1.3% of the population.

There were 4,645 households, of which 28.8% had children under the age of 18 living with them, 13.0% were married couples living together, 32.3% had a female householder with no husband present, 6.5% had a male householder with no wife present, and 48.2% were non-families. 43.4% of all households were made up of individuals, and 16.1% had someone living alone who was 65 years of age or older. The average household size was 2.36 and the average family size was 3.30.

Highland Park had the highest percent of single people, 87%, of any city in Michigan.

The median age in the city was 40.5 years. 23.7% of the city's population was under age 18; 10% was between age 18 and 24; 21.9% was from age 25 to 44; 30% was from age 45 to 64; and 14.4% was age 65 or older. The populace was 49.2% male and 50.8% female.

=== 2000 census ===
As of the 2000 census, there were 16,746 people, 6,199 households, and 3,521 families residing in the city. The population density was 5,622.9 inhabitants per square mile (2,171.0/km^{2}). There were 7,249 housing units at an average density of 2,434.1 per square mile (939.8/km^{2}). The racial makeup was 4.11% White, 93.44% African American, 0.27% Native American, 0.24% Asian, 0.02% Pacific Islander, 0.25% from other races, and 1.67% from two or more races. Hispanic or Latino of any race were 0.57% of the population.

There were 6,199 households, of which 27.6% had children under the age of 18 living with them, 17.0% were married couples living together, 33.4% had a female householder with no husband present, and 43.2% were non-families. 38.4% of all households were made up of individuals, and 15.6% had someone living alone who was 65 years of age or older. The average household size was 2.56 and the average family size was 3.43.

29.1% of the city's population was under the age of 18, 8.6% was from age 18 to 24, 27.5% was from age 25 to 44, 20.2% was from age 45 to 64, and 14.5% was 65 years of age or older. The median age was 34 years. For every 100 females, there were 85.7 males. For every 100 females age 18 and over, there were 79.6 males.

The city's median household income was $17,737, and the median family income was $26,484. Males had a median income of $31,014 versus $26,186 for females. The city's per capita income was $12,121. About 32.1% of families and 38.3% of the population were below the poverty line, including 47.1% of those under age 18 and 30.8% of those age 65 or over.

Between the 1990 Census and the 2000 Census, the population fell by 17%.

== Government and infrastructure ==
=== Municipal services ===
Highland Park is governed under the council-mayor form of government. The mayor is the executive and administrative head of the city, and appoints city officers such as the city clerk, city treasurer, city attorney, and finance director as well as other department heads. The city council consists of five members, two members who are elected at large and three who are elected from the city's three electoral districts. The at-large member who receives the most votes becomes council president for that term. The mayor and city council members are limited to four consecutive four-year terms in office, though are eligible to run for office again one year after the conclusion of their fourth consecutive term. The city levies an income tax of 2 percent on residents and 1 percent on nonresidents.

However, using the Public Act 72 of 1990, Governor John Engler appointed an emergency financial manager to take over the city's financial operations in December 2000, effectively relegating the mayor, city council, and other elected public officers to advisory roles. Ramona Henderson-Pearson was appointed the city's first emergency financial manager. In 2002, Henderson-Pearson laid off most city workers. She shuttered several city buildings including the McGregor public library and the old Civic Center buildings on Gerald Street. Her successor, Arthur Blackwell, was appointed in 2005 and fired in April 2009 for over-payments that he received. The third and final emergency financial manager, Robert Mason, returned the city to local control in July 2009.

The city administration works out of the Robert B. Blackwell Municipal Building at 12050 Woodward Avenue.

The old Municipal Building at 28‒30 Gerald Street was opened in 1927. Designed by Marcus Burrowes and Frank Eurich, Jr. in the Classical Revival style, it was the final element of the Highland Park Civic Center ensemble located on both sides of Gerald Street near Woodward Avenue. It remains as a monument to the rapidly growing and wealthy Highland Park of the 1910s and 1920s. From 1999 to 2001, it also housed the police department, then fell into disuse. As of 2020, it continues to await redevelopment as part of a wider regeneration of downtown Highland Park by means of a Tax increment financing district, or potential listing in the National Register of Historic Places.

==== Police Department ====
The Highland Park Police Department was headquartered in a building opened at 25 Gerald Street in 1917. In 1984 the police and fire departments were merged into a Public Safety Department. The former police and then public safety headquarters building was vacated in 1999. All operations moved across the street into the old Municipal Building, which in turn was vacated in 2001 with all functions moving to the Robert Blackwell Municipal Building. In December 2001, the city police department was formally disbanded, at which time the Wayne County Sheriff Department took over policing the city. The Highland Park Police Department was re-established on July 1, 2007.

The police administrative offices are located in the Robert Blackwell Municipal Building, and the patrol station is in a mini-station in the Model-T Plaza strip mall. It has occupied that facility since 2007. The jail facility there is a makeshift chain-link cage. The police department has a business liaison office in the Woodward Place Plaza.

==== Fire Department ====
The village of Highland Park's fire department was established in 1911. It was housed in the first municipal building at 20 Gerald Street, designed by Albert E. Williams and opened in 1911. Given Highland Park's rapid growth and industrialization in the 1910s and 1920s, the police and the municipal government moved to purpose-built buildings in 1917 and 1927, respectively. The first municipal building was expanded and altered several times until it became the headquarters of the Highland Park Fire Department (HPFD), established in 1917.

At its peak, the fire department employed about 84 firefighters and had four fire stations across the city. One of them was Engine 4, Ladder 3 at 19–21 Sturtevant Street, near Hamilton Avenue (demolished in 2013).

Highland Park's shrinking population and tax base took its toll. In 1984 the police and fire departments were merged into a Public Safety Department. The fire department again became a separate entity in 2005. By that time, the headquarters building on Gerald Street was deemed uninhabitable. The department moved to an old, 40000 sq. ft. warehouse at 12900 Oakland Park Boulevard, near Oakland Avenue and the Davison Freeway at the edge of the city, where it remained until 2013.

A $2.7 million Federal Emergency Management Agency grant made available by the American Recovery and Reinvestment Act enabled construction of a new, purpose-built station. It was built on the site of the old police headquarters, demolished in 2012, at 25 Gerald Street, across the street from the condemned Fire Department headquarters. The new fire station was opened on September 3, 2013.

== Economy ==
Chrysler was headquartered in Highland Park. In 1992 the company announced it would move its headquarters to its technology center in Auburn Hills, approximately 25 miles (40 km) north of the original headquarters site. The company planned to accomplish the move by 1995. In 1992 Chrysler had 25% of Highland Park's tax base and contributed 50% of the city's budget. Chrysler had about 5,000 employees in Highland Park when it moved.

In 2009 Magna International announced plans to start an automotive seat production operation in the former Chrysler headquarters. The plant on the site of the former Chrysler headquarters opened in June 2010.

The gear-reduction starter Chrysler used from the early 1960s through the late 1980s garnered the nickname "Highland Park Hummingbird" after Chrysler's hometown and the starter's distinctive cranking sound.

Despite Chrysler's departure, the city remains associated with Chrysler in the minds of auto enthusiasts.

== Education ==
=== Primary and secondary schools ===
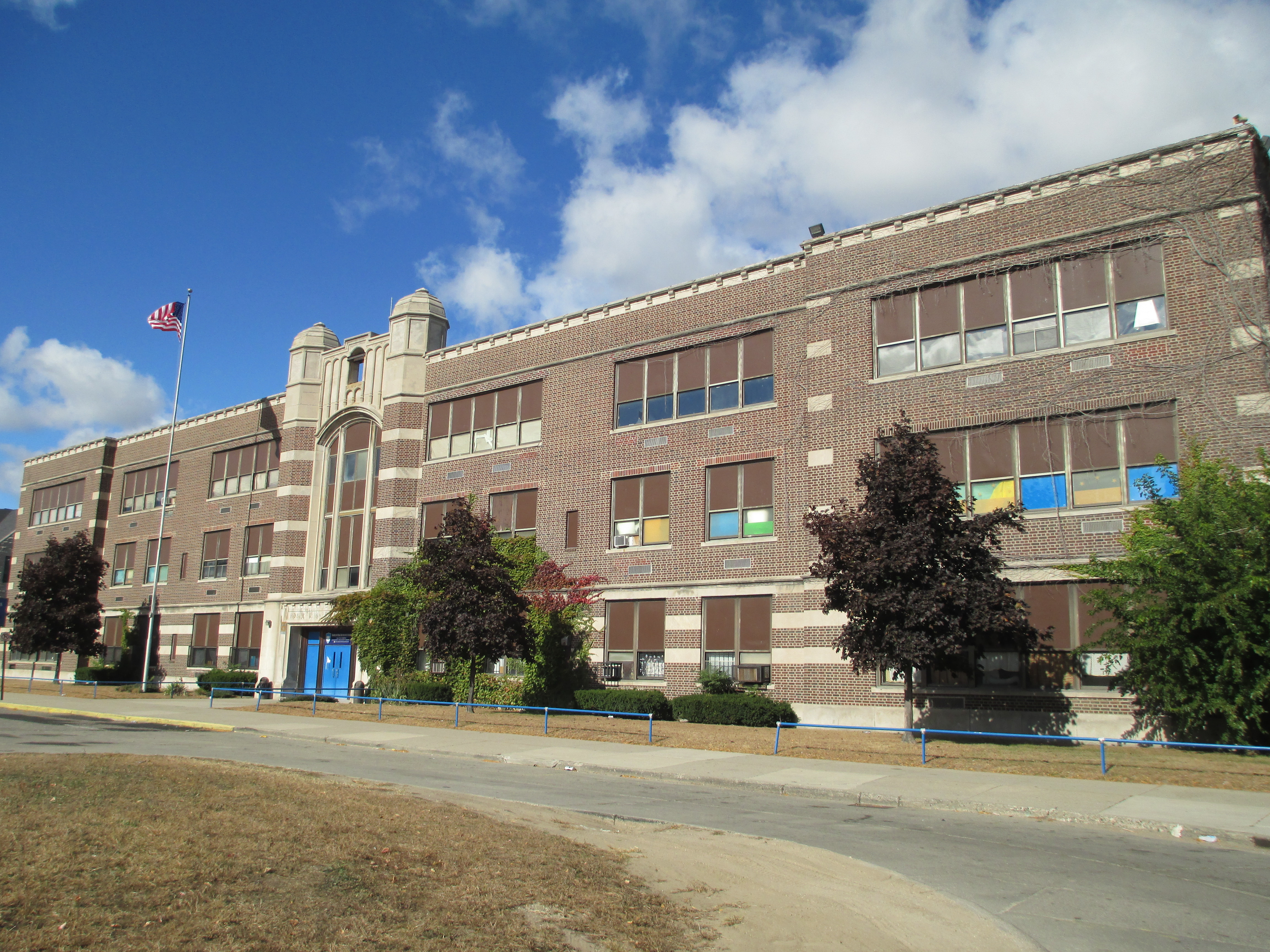
Highland Park Renaissance Academy Barber Campus (K-8)

Highland Park is served by Highland Park Schools, which was reorganized in 2012 as the Highland Park Public School Academy System, a public school academy district. The academy operates one school, Barber Preparatory Academy, a K-8 school. For high school education, students are zoned to Northwestern High School in the Detroit Public Schools Community District. Highland Park Community High School of Highland Park Schools closed in 2015.

George Washington Carver Academy is a K-8 charter school that was originally authorized by academy. The school's 2008 mathematics and English standardized test scores for 4th grade students were invalidated after cheating had been discovered. In 2013 the school participated in the "Students for Peace" competition in order to reduce the amount of fighting on campus; in 2012 91% of the students had received suspensions because they participated in fighting. In 2016 it had 560 students, and it is managed by Midwest Management Group. That year it changed its authorizer to Bay Mills Community College out of concern that the Highland Park school district may collapse.

=== Colleges and universities ===
Lawrence Technological University was founded in 1932 in Highland Park by the Lawrence brothers as the Lawrence Institute of Technology and adopted its current name in 1989. Lawrence Tech moved to Southfield, Michigan, from its site in Highland Park, Michigan, in 1955.

Highland Park Community College was in Highland Park before its 1996 closing. It had been known as Highland Park Junior College.

=== Public library ===
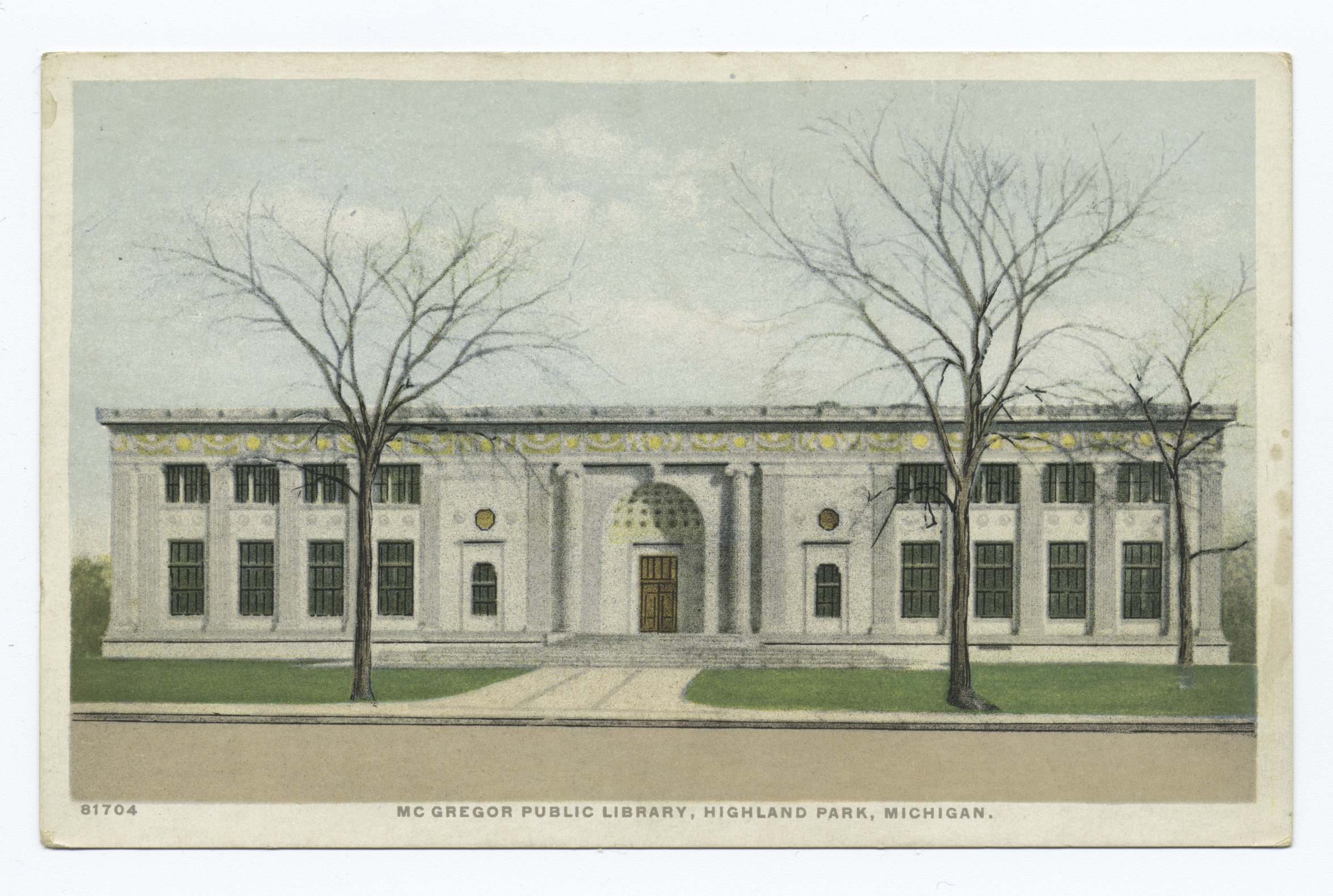
McGregor Public Library

In 1918 Katherine and Tracy McGregor, wealthy individuals, deeded the property of a facility for "homeless, crippled, and backward children." The McGregor Public Library opened on that site in 1924. The library closed in 2002. Around 2007 the city began efforts to re-open the library. However, little action has taken place to re-open the building.

== Parks and recreation ==
The Ernest T. Ford Recreation Center serves as a recreation center for the community. The center has a basketball court, exercise equipment, pool tables, table games, and televisions. After a renovation, it re-opened in February 2008. In 1993 Highland Park Community College won the MCCAA Division 1 Men's Basketball Championship against Macomb Community College.

== In popular culture ==
- 122 Beresford Street in Highland Park served as the filming location for a scene in the 2002 film 8 Mile where several of the movie's characters burn down an abandoned home. While the film company agreed to make a donation to the municipality, there were still protests in Highland Park given the city went through an arson spree that same year.
- Highland Park is featured in the 2005 film Four Brothers, where it is the site of an armed convenience store robbery.
- The 2007 documentary The Water Front chronicled the community's struggle against water privatization.
- The 2008 film Gran Torino, starring and directed by Clint Eastwood, is primarily filmed in Highland Park.
- A movie about a fictional lottery winner's attempt to reopen the McGregor Library, entitled Highland Park, starring Danny Glover, was filmed in October 2009 and released on video on demand in 2013.
- Highland Park Ford Plant was one of the locations for the 2011 film Real Steel.
- Highland Park was featured in an episode of American Diner Revival where they refurbished Red Hots Coney Island diner.
- Highland Park serves as one of the stages in Deus Ex: Human Revolution. Set in 2027, it serves as a front for a FEMA internment camp and as a temporary base of operations for both Belltower Spec-ops soldiers and the Tyrants.

== Notable people ==
- Ross Andru (1927–1993), comic book artist
- Pepper Adams (1930–1986), jazz saxophonist
- Edwin Baker (born 1991), football player
- Ed Budde (1940–2023), football player
- Rex Cawley (1940–2022), athlete
- John Conyers (1929–2019), former U.S. Representative for Michigan
- Todd Cruz (1955–2008), baseball player
- Ike Delock (1929–2022), baseball pitcher
- Terry Duerod (1956–2020), basketball player
- Lee Gordon (1923–1963), entrepreneur, rock and roll promoter
- Bill Haley (1925–1981), rock and roll musician, born in Highland Park
- Butch Hartman (born 1965), animator
- Brad Havens (born 1959), baseball pitcher
- Bobby Joe Hill (1943–2002), basketball player, 1966 national champion point guard for Texas Western, the first all-black starting lineup in NCAA history.
- Telma Hopkins (born 1948), actress, singer
- Doc Kimmel (1926–2022), physician and Florida state legislator
- Dick Lane (1927–2018), baseball player
- Joan Leslie (1925–2015), actress
- Adele Mara (1923–2010), actress
- Keith McKenzie (born 1973), football player
- Reggie McKenzie (born 1950), football player
- Tim Meadows (born 1961), actor
- Elvis Mitchell (born 1958), film critic and author
- Moodymann, DJ and music producer
- Billy Pierce (1927–2015), baseball player
- Ted Simmons (born 1949), baseball player
- Johnny Werhas (born 1938), baseball player and minister
- Jackie Wilson (1934–1984), soul singer
- James C. Turner (born 1946), filmmaker
- John Deaton (born 1966 or 1967) two time senatorial candidate for Massachusetts

== See also ==
- Hamtramck, another enclave of Detroit
- History of the African-Americans in Metro Detroit

== Additional sources ==
- Binelli, Mark. Detroit City is the Place to Be. Metropolitan Books, Henry Holt and Company (New York). First Edition, 2012. ISBN 978-0-8050-9229-5 (hardback version).
- Howell, Sally. "Competing for Muslims: New Strategies for Urban Renewal in Detroit". Located in: Shryock, Andrew (editor). Islamophobia/Islamophilia: Beyond the Politics of Enemy and Friend. Indiana University Press, June 30, 2010. ISBN 0253004543.
- Boscarino, Timothy and Webb, Michael. "Description and History, Highland Park Civic Center". Prepared for the Steven C. Flum, Inc. and the City of Highland Park, November 2013.
