= Highland Park Community High School =

Location
- 15900 Woodward Avenue; Highland Park, Michigan, Michigan 48203; United States; 42.4126°N 83.1002°W

Information
- Type: Public High
- Motto: "Striving for Excellence; Learning for Life"
- Established: Early 1900s
- Closed: 2016, bulldozed sometime before October 2016 according to Google Maps images
- School district: Highland Park Schools
- Principal: Belvin Liles
- Grades: 9-12
- Enrollment: 775 (approx.)
- Campus: Urban
- Colors: Blue and White
- Mascot: Polar Bears
- Accreditation: North Central Association
- Affiliation: Independent

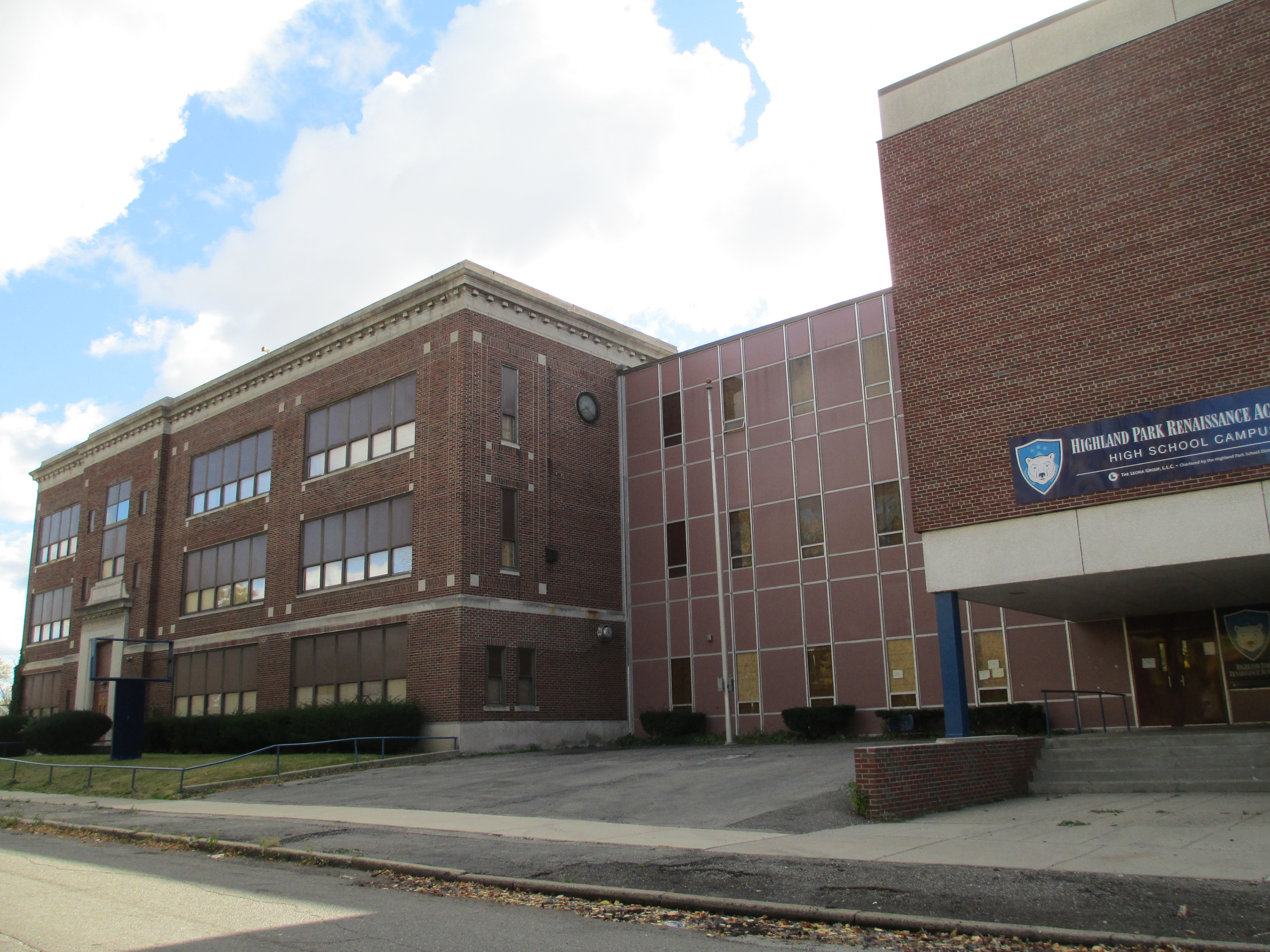
Highland Park Schools headquarters and former Highland Park Renaissance Academy High School Campus at 131 Pilgrim Street

Highland Park Community High School (often known as Highland Park High School) was a public high school in Highland Park, Michigan. About 775 students attended Highland Park in about 2012. Its mascot was the polar bears, and its school colors were blue and white. It was a part of Highland Park Schools, but had been operated as a charter school by Leona Group as the Highland Park Renaissance High School from August 2012, until the end of the 2014–2015 school year, when it was scheduled to close. It was later bulldozed and is now a vacant lot.

== History ==
The final Highland Park High School was built in 1977 to better accommodate students than the old facility had. In the 1970s Highland Park lost over 20% of its population. The previous high school building was closed in 1978 so the students could attend classes at the new building.

The high school had direct access to Highland Park Junior College (later Highland Park Community College), attracting students; Jack Martin, who later became the Detroit Public Schools emergency manager, said that the community college "was harder to get into than Wayne State." During its prime, it had graduating classes of 300 students each. Students continued to enroll despite the move of Chrysler to the suburbs. Many African-American families sent their children to the school so they could get an education comparable to that of schools in suburbs without having to move to the suburbs. The school had a pool used to train swimmers for Michigan state championships.

The school began to decline in the 1990s. The student population decreased and academic programs and after school activities decreased. The community college closed in 1996. The school pool closed during that decade. In 2000 the school district began operating on a deficit. In a five-year period before 2012, enrollment plummeted, with 450 students in 2012.

When Martin visited the school he encountered many empty and unused classrooms and various kinds of damage and wear, including water damage, exposed concrete beams, missing and falling ceiling panels, and exposed wiring. Doors had knocked out glass panels and missing doorknobs. Some lockers had fire damage because students had set the lockers on fire. The school budget did not have sufficient finances to fix all of the damage.

As of 2012 the district continued to maintain the former Highland Park High School and considered opening it to students for the 2012-2013 school year. At the time it had almost 400 students.

In 2014 the high school moved to the Ford School campus. By 2015 enrollment had fallen to 160 students, and in May 2015 it was announced that the high school would close in June, with the district negotiating an agreement that could allow students to attend the Detroit Public Schools. In addition to DPS schools, students are eligible to attend charter schools, Education Achievement Authority schools, and suburban schools which accept transfers. In June 2015 representatives of schools from DPS schools and other Metro Detroit schools attended a high school fair to convince Highland Park students to attend their schools. Highland Park High School was scheduled to close on at the end of June 2015. In fall 2015 160 students who formerly attended Highland Park High were enrolled in other area schools; 72 were in DPS schools, including Detroit Collegiate Preparatory High School at Northwestern, which became the zoned high school for Highland Park. Other students moved on to the Education Achievement Authority (EAA) Central Collegiate Academy.

Bert Johnson, a member of the Michigan Senate; and LaTanya Garrett, a member of the Michigan House of Representatives, said that they were trying to reopen the high school.

== Demographics ==
In 2012 the school had 450 students; many of them lived in Detroit. Aaron Foley of MLive.com said "For many, however, Highland Park Community High School still remains a better alternative to unproven charter schools, outlying suburban schools and the state-controlled Detroit Public Schools."

== Academics ==
Highland Park Community High School was recognized by the North Central Association of Colleges and Schools and was slowly improving its academic perception in the Metro Detroit area.

In 2011 the school had a 67% four-year graduation rate; the statewide rate is 76%. In 2011 the mean ACT score for the school was 14.9. The statewide mean ACT score was 19.3.

== Athletics ==
Highland Park in the eighties and early nineties had powerful swim teams that were all African American male and female swimmers, Coach by Marion Hayes and Coach John Hodge. The swim team won three SEC championships. The swim program shut down after 1993. Notable SEC champions for Highland Park: John Mayes (1986), John Smith (1987), Eric Smith (1987) William Thomas (1989), Bruce Pearson (1989) (diving).

Highland Park was a Class B athletic school and was independent of a conference since 2009. In recent years, Highland Park had athletic success, including two state semi-final finishes in Football in 2005 and 2006, a district championship in girls softball in 2006. The baseball team had a remarkable season in 2008 as it went 20-7 and were Michigan Mega Conference Champions. The school also has 2 state championships in Boys basketball (1952, 1975). They also had 7 individual wrestling championships by Jarod Trice (2006, 2007), Anthony Jones (2007), Marcell Dubose (2005, 2006), and Quean Smith (2010, 2011). Highland Park had multiple runner up appearances in wrestling and boys basketball. The school offered:

- Football
- Boys Baseball
- Girls Softball
- Girls Volleyball
- Boys and Girls Track and field
- Boys and Girls Cross Country
- Boys and Girls Basketball
- Girls Cheerleading

== Notable alumni ==
- Bob Bruce, former MLB player (Detroit Tigers, Houston Astros, Atlanta Braves)
- Terry Duerod, former NBA player for the Boston Celtics and Golden State Warriors
- Ted Gray, former MLB pitcher (Detroit Tigers, New York Yankees, Cleveland Indians, Chicago White Sox, Baltimore Orioles)
- Telma Hopkins, singer/actress
- Doug Hollie, football player
- Bobby Joe Hill, basketball player, point guard of the 1966 NCAA Texas Western University championship team
- Reggie McKenzie, NFL football player for the Buffalo Bills
- Elvis Mitchell, film critic
- Lila Neuenfelt, lawyer and judge
- Billy Pierce, former MLB pitcher (Detroit Tigers, Chicago White Sox, San Francisco Giants)
- Thomas F. Schweigert, member of the Michigan Senate and acting Lieutenant Governor of Michigan
- Martha G. Scott, former member of the Michigan Senate and Michigan House of Representatives
- George Trapp, former NBA player for the Atlanta Hawks and Detroit Pistons
- John Trapp, basketball player for UNLV, 15th overall pick of 1968 NBA draft
- Roxanne Arlen, an actress
