= Highland Park Schools =

School district in Michigan, United States

Coordinates: 42°23′52″N 83°05′29″W

School District of the City of Highland Park

Location
- Highland Park, Michigan USA

District information
- Type: Public (Charter)
- Grades: PreK—8
- President: Janet Spight White
- Vice-president: Shamayim Harris
- Superintendent: Domini Nailer
- Schools: 1

Students and staff
- Students: 273 (2020-21)
- Teachers: 6
- Student–teacher ratio: 51:1

Other information
- Website: http://www.hipark.org/

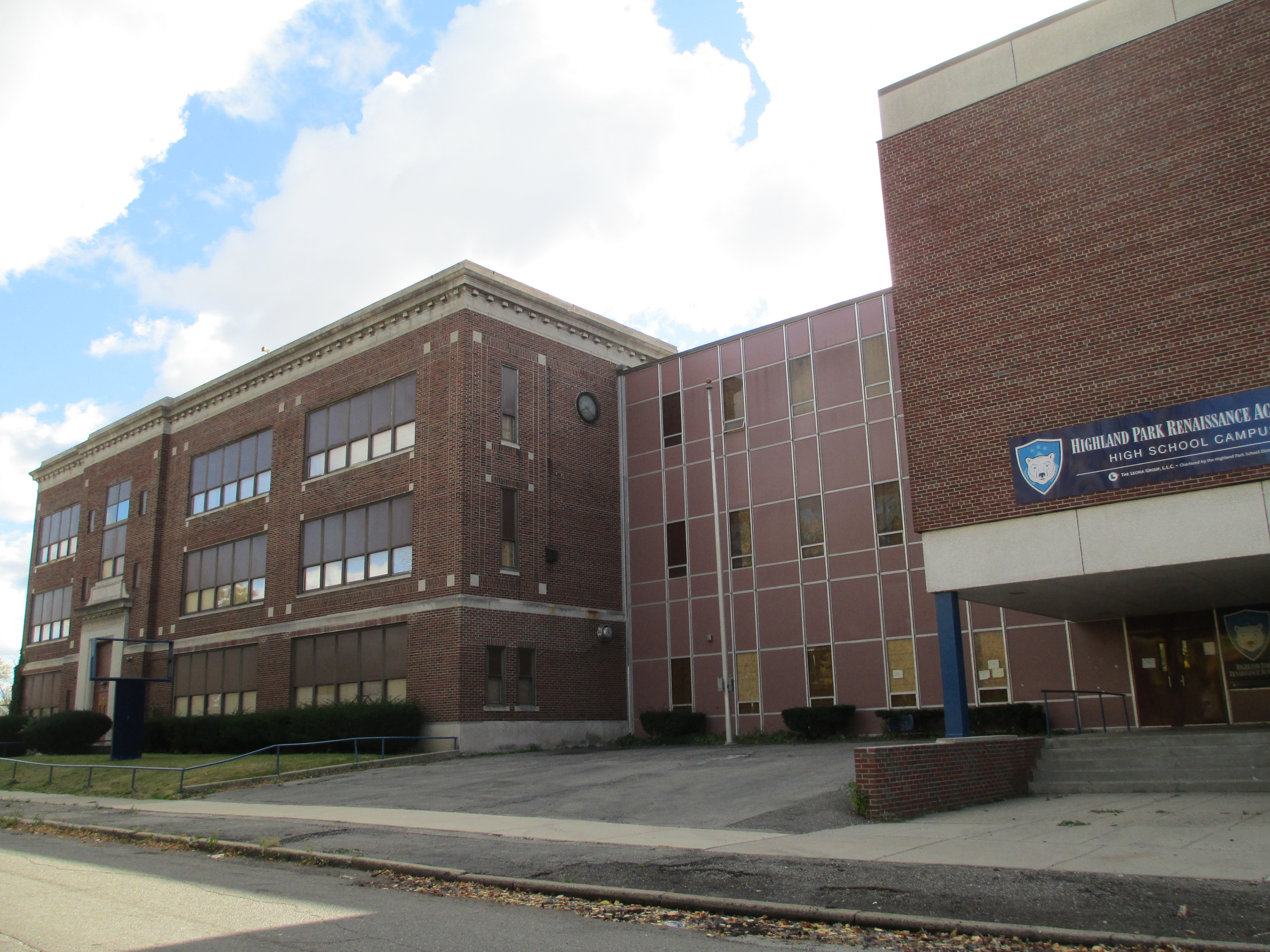
The previous Highland Park Schools headquarters and former Highland Park Renaissance Academy High School Campus at 131 Pilgrim

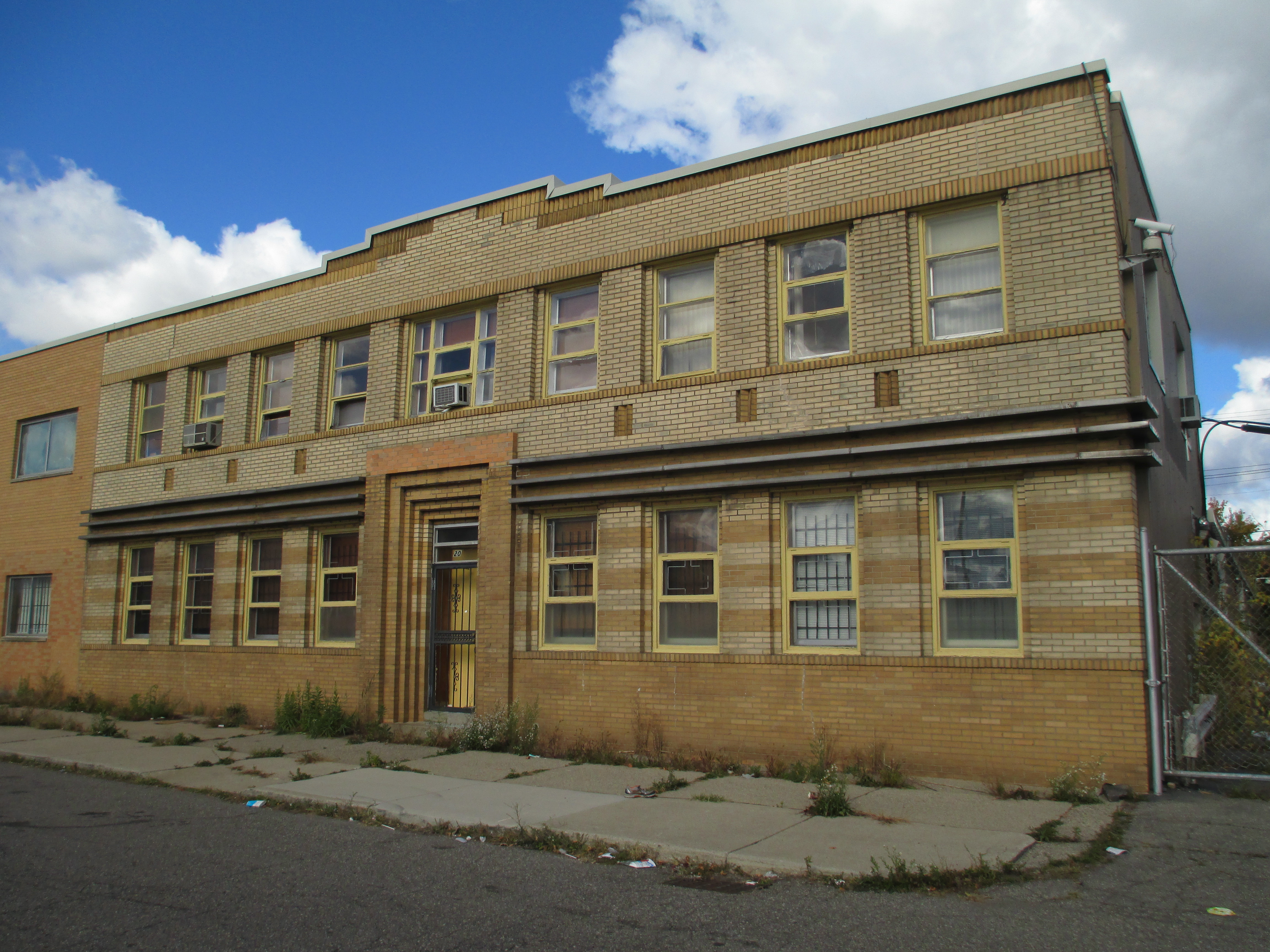
Former headquarters at 20 Bartlett

Highland Park Schools, officially the School District of the City of Highland Park, is a school district headquartered in Highland Park, Michigan, United States in Greater Detroit. The district serves the city of Highland Park, a total of 2.98 square miles (7.7 km^{2}) of land.

In 2012, the school board authorized the reorganization of the district as a "public school academy" system according to state law, and named it the Highland Park Public School Academy System. In turn, the school academy system has contracted with various charter school operators, who oversee the management and day-to-day operations of the district's properties. Beginning in 2017, the district has been in a Cooperative Education Program Agreement with Detroit Public Schools to offer high school services to students living in the district, with Northwestern High School as their neighborhood high school.

== History ==
Once the "Schools of Choice" program was passed into state law, the district had begun accepting students from Detroit and Hamtramck.

In 1977, the current high school was built for the increasing numbers of students transferring from other school districts (particularly Detroit). Some students were motivated by Highland Park students' access to Highland Park Junior College, which was known to be selective. Jack Martin, who was the emergency manager of HPPS appointed by the state, said that it was a junior college "that was harder to get into than Wayne State."

With the loss of Chrysler and drug dealers coming into the area, the high school was a point of pride for the District and City as it remained a draw for black families seeking suburban-style education without moving there.

Beginning in the 1990s, the district began its decline with the closing of its pool that state-champions used to train in. With students slowing began to leave. Cuts to programs both academic and after-school accrued yearly. In 1996, another hit came in the closing of Highland Park Community College. Deficit spending and deterioration of the buildings began setting in during the 2000s.

In 2003, 45% of the district's students did not live in Highland Park. This prevented significant closings of schools, prevented a state takeover, and added $2 million to the district's budget. Sally Howell, author of "Competing for Muslims: New Strategies for Urban Renewal in Detroit", wrote that "Many of the non-resident students who matriculated in Highland Park had serious disciplinary, academic, or personal problems." In 2006 the district had over 3,000 students. After 2007, student enrollment has dropped off quickly with families either leaving the District altogether or transfer the students elsewhere. In 2012 there were fewer than 1,000 students in the district schools.

=== Efforts to attract Arab and Muslim students ===
In 2005 the district made plans to attract Arab and Muslim students resident in Detroit and Hamtramck. Dr. Theresa Saunders, the superintendent of the school system, hired Yahya Alkebsi (Arabic: يحيى الكبسي), a Yemeni-American educator, as the district's Arab Muslim consultant. It added Arabic-speaking teachers, and began offering instruction in Arabic. Sallow Howell, author of "Competing for Muslims: New Strategies for Urban Renewal in Detroit", said that the district began treating "Muslim families more directly like consumers". Howell said that the district agreed "to segregate Muslim students from mainstream classrooms" but that the district routinely denied that this was the case. Alkebsi said that he would bring halal food to HPS schools, but he was unable to do so. The district instead had vegetarian options.

=== Financial emergency ===
In January 2012, the State of Michigan's review team issued a report recommending that the Governor appoint an emergency manager. The team found that the District had 3 or more years of deficit spending, failed to spend money according to grant and appropriations and failure to have policy and procedures in place. The School Board voted to challenge the appointment of an Emergency Manager. On Monday January 30, 2012, Emergency Manager Jack Martin appointed by Governor of Michigan Rick Snyder took control of the School District.

Robert Davis, a community activist, had embezzled over $125,000 from the district between 2004 and 2010. He pleaded guilty to two charges: filing a false tax return and conversion. The latter charge has a 10-year sentence. He was scheduled to be sentenced on December 9, 2014.

=== Charter system ===
In August 2012, the charter academy system entered into a contract with the Leona Group LLC. The original school district remained to pay off debts and collect tax revenue. The Highland Park Schools district has an elected board with no capability of influencing the decisions made by the charter schools authorized by it. In 2014 the Highland Park Public School Academy System had a deficit of $600,000. None of this debt was incurred by the original Highland Park School District.

In 2015 the emergency manager, Don Weatherspoon, announced that the Leona-controlled district was closing its high school. Bert Johnson, a member of the Michigan Senate; and LaTanya Garrett, a member of the Michigan House of Representatives, said that they were trying to reopen the high school. The American Civil Liberties Union (ACLU) filed a lawsuit saying that the district was failing to provide an adequate level of education. The Michigan Court of Appeals ruled that the legal system is not the proper place for this lawsuit and the Michigan Supreme Court refused to hear the case.

In 2016, the other charter school authorized by Highland Park Schools, George Washington Carver Academy, announced that it was switching its authorizer to Bay Mills Community College, causing the school district to lose $125,000 in yearly revenue it had received for the school's operations. The district previously received 3% of the money the State of Michigan gave to the school per student; the state gave $7,300 per student at Carver. This left the Highland Park Public School Academy as the only school authorized by the Highland Park school district. Receivership for the HP school district ended in 2018.

In 2019 July, Highland Park Public School Academy System chose not to renew its contract with the for-profit Leona Group and chose the nonprofit Promise Schools as its charter operator until at least 2022. By 2020, the district began seeking a charter operator to establish a new charter high school.

== Operations ==
The school district is currently headquartered at 12360 Woodward Avenue. Previously the district was headquartered in the Henry Ford Campus. It was also once headquartered at 20 Bartlett.

== Academics ==
HPS developed the Career Academy, a program to allow under-achieving students to graduate from high school or to be certified for a GED.

== Schools ==
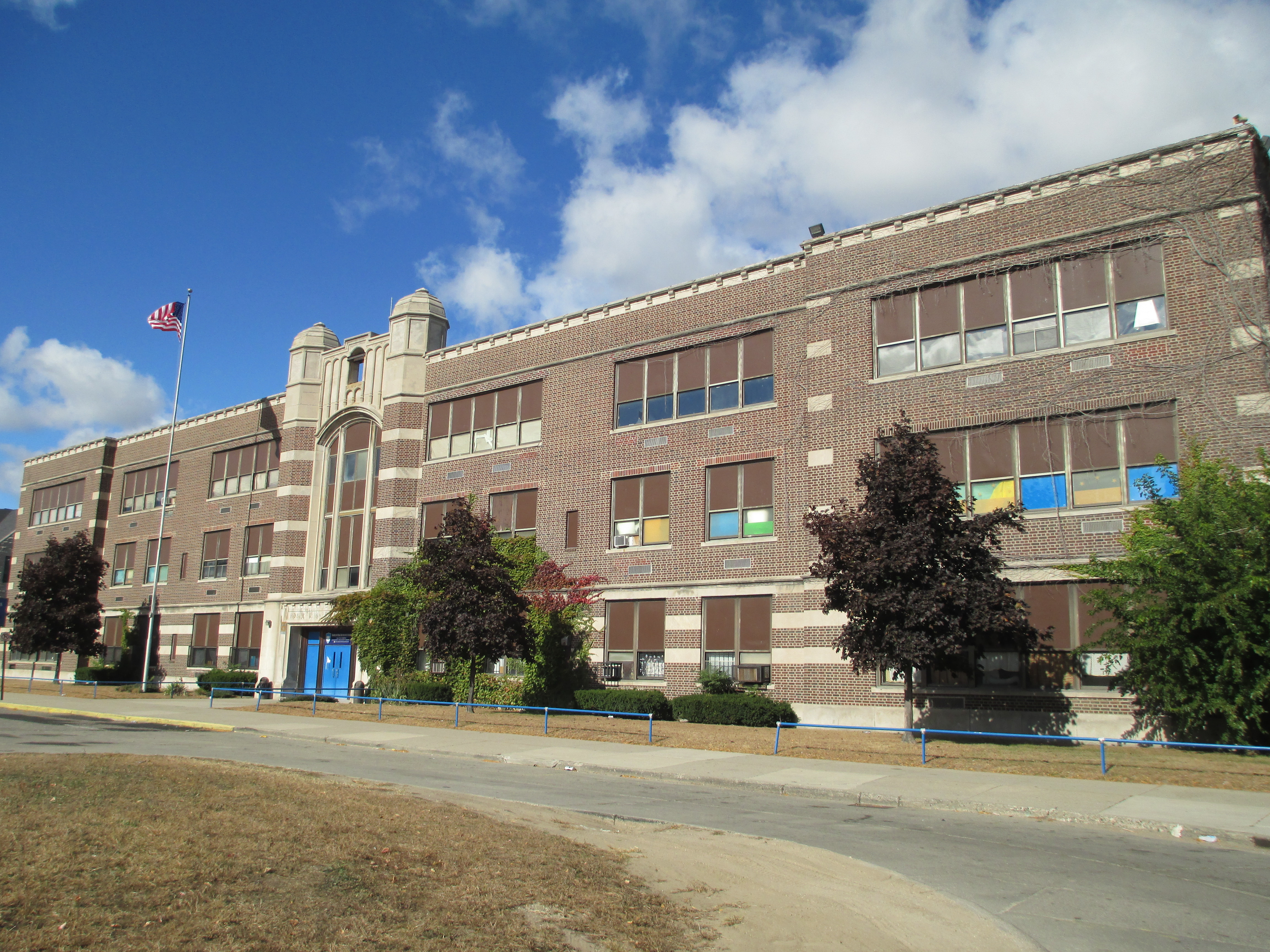
Front of Highland Park Renaissance Academy, the only remaining charter school authorized by Highland Park Schools.

K-8

- Barber Preparatory Academy (formerly Highland Park Renaissance Academy, Barber Campus)

=== Defunct Schools ===
High schools:

- Highland Park Renaissance Academy High School Campus (formerly Highland Park Community High School)
- Old Highland Park High School - Closed in 2009, currently abandoned.

Primary schools:

- Cortland Elementary School - repurposed as Highland Park Head Start.
- Ferris Elementary School - Currently abandoned as of 2019—slated to be razed.
- Highland Park Renaissance Academy Henry Ford Campus (formerly Henry Ford Academy and Henry Ford Elementary School)
- Liberty Elementary School (formerly Liberty Focus Academy)
- Midland Elementary School - This school has been razed.
- Thompson Elementary School - Currently abandoned as of 2019—slated to be razed.
- Willard Elementary School - This school has been razed.
- Angell Elementary School On Gerald St. This school has been razed.

=== Other ===
K-8:

- George Washington Carver Academy (charted by Bay Mills Community College since 2016)

== Notable alumni ==
- Telma Hopkins, actress
- Martha Scott, State Senator
- Reggie McKenzie, retired NFL player
- Ingrid Walton, better known as CoCo, WJLB morning co-host
- J. Douglas "Doug" Hollie, a 1980 graduate, retired NFL player
