= Inaugural lecture =

Formal public lecture by a new professor

An inaugural lecture is a formal public lecture given at a university by a newly appointed full professor, the holder of a chair. It marks the professor's official introduction to the academic community. These lectures are often attended by colleagues, students, and sometimes the general public. They are a way to showcase the professor's expertise and to contribute to the intellectual life of the institution.

== Dublin ==
At Trinity College Dublin, inaugural lectures serve as a platform for newly appointed professors with personal or established chairs to present their research and academic vision to the university community and the public.

== Cambridge ==
At the University of Cambridge, inaugural lectures are formal events where newly appointed professors present their academic vision and research to the university community and the public. These lectures serve to introduce the professor's scholarly focus and often take place in the faculty or department associated with their field. For instance, Esra Özyürek delivered her inaugural lecture upon becoming the Sultan Qaboos Professor of Abrahamic Faiths & Shared Values in 2020 . Similarly, George van Kooten presented his inaugural lecture in the Faculty of Divinity, discussing the triangulation of New Testament writings between Hellenistic-Jewish and Greek literature.

== United States ==
In the United States, inaugural lectures are less rigidly traditional than in universities like Oxford or Cambridge, but are still an important academic milestone for newly appointed professors, particularly those in endowed or distinguished chairs. Their purpose remains the same: to celebrate academic achievement and introduce a scholar's work to the university community.
