= Percy O. Clapp =

American football player and coach (1900–1960)

Biographical details
- Born: March 10, 1900; Roberts, Wisconsin, U.S.
- Died: July 2, 1960 (aged 60); Saint Paul, Minnesota, U.S.

Playing career

Football
- 1920–1922: River Falls State
- 1923–1924: Minnesota
- Positions: Tackle, guard

Coaching career (HC unless noted)

Football
- 1925–1930: Milwaukee Normal/State
- 1931–1934: Lawrence
- 1935–1936: Idaho (assistant)

Track
- 1925–1931: Milwaukee Normal/State

Administrative career (AD unless noted)
- 1925–1931: Milwaukee Normal/State

Head coaching record
- Overall: 40–24–10 (football)

Accomplishments and honors

Championships
- Football; 2 WSTCC (1929–1930)

Percy O. Clapp (March 10, 1900 – July 2, 1960) was an American college football player and coach. He served as the head football coach at Milwaukee State Teachers College—renamed from Milwaukee Normal School in 1927 and now known as the University of Wisconsin–Milwaukee—from 1925 to 1930 and at Lawrence College—now known as Lawrence University—in Appleton, Wisconsin from 1931 to 1934. Clapp was an assistant coach for two years at the University of Idaho under head coach Ted Bank.

Clapp played college football at the University of Minnesota as a tackle and guard from 1923 to 1924. He was hired at the head football and track coach at Milwaukee Normal in 1925. Clapp served in both world wars and later worked for the Veterans Administration in Saint Paul, Minnesota. Following an illness that forced an early retirement, he died at age 60 in Saint Paul, and is buried at Fort Snelling National Cemetery, south of Minneapolis.

== Head coaching record ==
=== Football ===
Year	Team	Overall	Conference	Standing	Bowl/playoffs
Milwaukee Normal / Milwaukee State Green Gulls (Wisconsin Normal Athletic Conference / Wisconsin State Teachers College Conference) (1925–1930)
1925	Milwaukee Normal	1–4–1	1–2–1	T–5th	
1926	Milwaukee State	5–0–2	3–0–1	2nd	
1927	Milwaukee State	4–2–2	2–1–1	4th	
1928	Milwaukee State	4–2–2	2–2	T–6th	
1929	Milwaukee State	7–0–1	3–0–1	1st	
1930	Milwaukee State	7–1	4–0	1st	
Milwaukee Normal/State:		28–9–8	15–5–4		
Lawrence Vikings (Big Four Conference / Midwest Conference) (1931–1932)
1931	Lawrence	2–4	1–2 / 0–3	3rd / 8th	
1932	Lawrence	3–4–1	1–2 / 1–2	3rd / T–6th	
Lawrence Vikings (Midwest Conference) (1933–1934)
1933	Lawrence	3–4	1–2	5th	
1934	Lawrence	4–3–1	2–2	T–4th	
Lawrence:		12–15–2	5–10		
Total:		40–24–10			
National championship Conference title Conference division title or championship game berth
