= James Turner (historian) =

American historian (born 1946)

- Born: James Crewdson Turner; May 25, 1946 (age 80)

Academic background
- Education: Harvard University

Academic work
- Discipline: History
- Sub-discipline: Intellectual history
- Institutions: College of Charleston; University of Massachusetts Boston; University of Michigan; University of Notre Dame

James Crewdson Turner (born June 25, 1946) is an intellectual historian and Cavanaugh Professor of Humanities Emeritus at the University of Notre Dame. After receiving his PhD from Harvard University in 1975, he taught at the College of Charleston (1975–1977), the University of Massachusetts Boston (1977–1984), and the University of Michigan (1984–1995) before moving to Notre Dame.

In 1980, James authored Reckoning with the Beast: Animals, Pain, and Humanity in the Victorian Mind, which documented the history of animal welfare that emerged in Britain during the early 19th-century and spread to the United States after the Civil War.

== Selected publications ==
- Reckoning with the Beast: Animals, Pain, and Humanity in the Victorian Mind, Johns Hopkins University Press, 1980
- Without God, Without Creed: The Origins of Unbelief in America, Johns Hopkins University Press, 1985
- The Liberal Education of Charles Eliot Norton, Johns Hopkins University Press, 1999
- The Sacred and the Secular University (with Jon H. Roberts), Princeton University Press, 2000
- Language, Religion, Knowledge: Past and Present, University of Notre Dame Press, 2003
- The Future of Christian Learning: An Evangelical and Catholic Dialogue (with Mark A. Noll), Brazos Press, 2008
- Religion Enters the Academy: The Origins of the Scholarly Study of Religion in America, University of Georgia Press, 2011
- Philology: The Forgotten Origins of the Modern Humanities, Princeton University Press, 2014
