= Northwestern High School (Michigan) =

High school in Detroit, Michigan, United States

Detroit Collegiate Preparatory Academy at Northwestern

Location
- 2200 West Grand Blvd. Detroit, Michigan; United States; 42.358°N 83.103°W

Information
- School type: Public high school
- School district: Detroit Public Schools Community District
- Principal: Mrs. Kimberly Rogers
- Grades: 9-12
- Enrollment: 436 (2023-24)
- Language: English
- Area: Urban
- Colors: Red; Grey
- Team name: Colt
- Website: Northwestern High School

Student assessments
- 2021–22 school year Change vs. prior year

M-STEP 11th grade proficiency rates (Science / Social Studies)
- Advanced %: ≤10 / ≤10
- Proficient %: ≤10 / ≤10
- PR. Proficient %: <3 / –
- Not Proficient %: – / –

Average test scores
- SAT Total: 760.2 (▼ −56.2)

Detroit Collegiate Preparatory Academy at Northwestern is a public high school in Detroit, part of Detroit Public Schools Community District, the re-named successor to Northwestern High School. The most recent enrollment figures for Northwestern indicate a student population of approximately 2,000.

The school features numerous extracurricular activities, including Debate, US Army JROTC, and interscholastic and intramural athletics. NHS also offers several advanced placement (AP) courses.

Northwestern serves as the neighborhood high school for Highland Park residents, as no senior high schools exist within Highland Park boundaries. As of 2018 about 180 students from Highland Park attended Northwestern.

Athletics and notable alumni include the legend alumni athlete Ron Teasley, the first African American captain of the Colts basketball team. After college, he returned as a Teacher, Mentor and Coach at Northwestern taking the basketball and baseball teams to PSL championships and produced several outstanding athletes who went on to play professionally. He is a NW Hall of Famer and is still active in the alumni association.

Alumni also includes some of the students who would go on to help shape the legendary rhythm and blues label Motown Records, namely Mary Wells and James Jamerson.

== History ==
In 2012 Southwestern High School closed; many former Southwestern students were rezoned to Northwestern.

Highland Park Community High School of Highland Park Schools closed in 2015. DPS became the designated school district for the high school students of Highland Park, and Northwestern High became the zoned high school for the city. That year United Automobile Workers (UAW)-Ford financed a renovation of the school's athletic facilities.

== Athletics ==
For more than one hundred years, Northwestern High School has produced many outstanding student athletes who have excelled at the collegiate level and beyond. Colt alumni achievements include National Collegiate Athletic Association championships and Olympic gold medals.

In 2007-2008, Northwestern High won the Detroit Public School League Championship in boys' basketball and boys' football in the same school year. Since 1919, Northwestern basketball teams have claimed a total of sixteen DPSSAL titles. Northwestern also won the 1928 Michigan High School Athletic Association basketball championship.

Coach Bert Maris led Northwestern's swimming and diving program to three consecutive MHSAA team titles (1925 through 1927). In 1930, the Colt swimming team, coached by Leo Maas, won another MHSAA championship trophy; Maas also guided the school to five consecutive DPSSAL titles (1933 through 1937). To this day, Northwestern remains the only Detroit public high school to win a state team championship in the sport of swimming and diving.

Bert Maris and Coach Warren Hoyt led Northwestern to the 1925 MHSAA title in track. Coach Malcom Weaver and the Colts won the state track championship in 1927, 1929 and 1930.

The Michigan high school sports archives also document Northwestern's MHSAA championship titles in tennis (1927), and cross country (1929).

Due to the influx of Highland Park students, as of about 2015 the school was in the process of restoring its marching band and the wrestling programs that had been popular at Highland Park Renaissance High.

The school's gymnasium, paint room, weight training room, and swimming pool were scheduled to receive renovations circa 2015.

== Notable alumni ==
- Florence Ballard, original member of the Motown girl-group The Supremes
- Henry Carr (1961), former world record holder at 200 meters; won two gold medals at 1964 Summer Olympics; competing for Arizona State University, was national collegiate and national AAU champion; played in the NFL for the New York Giants as a safety
- Albert Cleage, Christian minister; a leading advocate of the civil rights movement; his first book, The Black Messiah was published in 1968
- John Conyers, United States Congressman (1965–2017); chairman of the House Judiciary Committee
- Chris Douglas-Roberts, professional basketball player for the Milwaukee Bucks
- Lamont Dozier (1959), Motown songwriter
- Forest Evashevski (1935), 2000 inductee to the National Football Foundation College Football Hall of Fame
- Melvin Franklin (1959), bass singer for The Temptations
- Fletcher Gilders (1949), 1948 MHSAA Track and Field Athlete of the Year; in 1949, he established a national interscholastic record in pole vault (13' 3"); springboard diver; competed at the 1948 and 1956 US Olympic Trials
- Willie Horton, former MLB player (Detroit Tigers, Texas Rangers, Cleveland Indians, Oakland Athletics, Toronto Blue Jays, Seattle Mariners)
- Ken Howell, Major League Baseball pitcher with the Los Angeles Dodgers and Philadelphia Phillies.
- James Jamerson (1954), bass guitarist; performed on 30+ #1 Hits for Motown Records; known as the "father of modern bass guitar"
- Alex Johnson, former MLB player (Philadelphia Phillies, St. Louis Cardinals, Cincinnati Reds, California Angels, Texas Rangers, New York Yankees, Detroit Tigers), 1970 All-Star and American League home run champion
- Dennis Johnson, former NFL linebacker, Minnesota Vikings and Tampa Bay Buccaneers
- Ron Johnson (1974), played for Eastern Michigan University; selected in first round of 1978 NFL draft by Pittsburgh Steelers; cornerback and safety for seven seasons
- Ron A. Johnson (1965), played football at University of Michigan, and in the NFL for the Cleveland Browns and New York Giants
- Bill Jones (1984), professional basketball player
- Casey Kasem (born Kemal Amin), Legendary radio and television personality
- Damon Keith, Senior Judge, United States Court of Appeals for the Sixth Circuit
- Willie Kirkland, former MLB player (San Francisco Giants, Cleveland Indians, Baltimore Orioles, Washington Senators)
- Byron Krieger (1920-2015), Olympic fencer
- Hobie Landrith (1948), played college baseball for Michigan State; catcher for several Major League Baseball teams; first player chosen by the 1962 New York Mets expansion team
- John Mayberry, former MLB player (Houston Astros, Kansas City Royals, Toronto Blue Jays, New York Yankees)
- Ernie McCoy (1927), basketball player and head coach for University of Michigan, athletic director at Penn State
- David M. Nelson (1938), University of Michigan halfback; innovative football coach who developed the Wing T formation
- Philip Northrup (1923), top-rated long jumper among Michigan high school athletes in 1923; three-time NCAA champion and four-time All-American, in the javelin throw and pole vault, for the University of Michigan (1925–27); inducted to university's Hall of Fame in 2007
- Ray Parker Jr., guitarist, songwriter, producer, recording artist; wrote the theme for Ghostbusters
- Henry Reed, NFL player
- Carlos Rogers (1989), retired professional basketball player; first-round selection of Seattle SuperSonics during the 1994 NBA draft
- Howard Sims (1933–2016), architect in Detroit
- Art Stringer (1972), former NFL linebacker
- Terry Tyler (1974), selected to Sunkist All-American Team; played for University of Detroit, then 11 seasons of professional basketball with three NBA teams
- Willis Ward (1931), won high jump at 1929 MHSAA championships; won 120 and 220-yard hurdles at 1930 MHSAA finals; set national high school mark (1.98 meters) in high jump while winning a third consecutive DPSSAL title in 1931; the second African-American to letter in football at University of Michigan; in track, three-time All-American and eight-time Big-Ten champion; later a Wayne County probate judge
- Mary Wells (1961), singer with Motown Records, famous for the hit song "My Guy"
- Norman Whitfield (1958), Motown songwriter
- Otis Williams (1959) of the Temptations
