= Carole Harris =

American quiltmaker (born 1943)

Carole Harris (born 1943) is an African American designer, and fiber and textile artist from Detroit, Michigan. Quilting is a key medium for her, which she has adapted to new forms of abstract art. Her art has been influenced by the people, history and the musical legacy of Detroit as well as African textile practice. Her work has been shown in the United States, Europe, and Asia, and Harris has received numerous honors such as the Kresge Arts Fellowship.

== Family and early life ==
Carole Harris was born in 1943 at Wayne Diagnostic Hospital, a Black hospital in then-segregated Detroit, Michigan, during the summer of the 1943 Detroit riots. Harris was born two months prematurely at only 2 pounds, and spent extended time in the hospital as a result. Her mother had to take public transportation across the rioting to bring breast milk to the hospital for Harris. "That trauma," Harris has said, "was my start to life." Her father was away serving in the U.S. army during World War II, so her mother moved in with family until his return in 1945. They lived with Harris's grandfather Bishop Simmons, who had migrated to Detroit in the 1930s from Tennessee, and Harris's Aunt Ida, a lifelong role model for Harris as the matriarch of the family and a working woman.

At six years old, Harris's mother taught her to embroider. She also learned to sew at a very young age, so early that Harris doesn't consciously remember when she started. She made much of her own clothing as a young woman. Her grandmother and mother were both traditional quilters. The first quilt that Harris made used a "pinwheel pattern" design for her wedding to Bill Harris in 1966. A key reason quilting interested her was because she considered it to be a "nonintimidating art form." She met Harris, a writer, while they were both students at Highland Park Junior College. They are still married and continue to live in Detroit.

== Education ==
Harris went to public school on the East Side of Detroit, in a multiracial working-class neighborhood. Advanced in her skills, she entered school in the first grade rather than kindergarten and she would eventually skip 5th grade too. She loved school and learning and showed artistic talent while attending Cass Technical High School, but did not consider an education or career in the arts until college. Harris started her higher education at Highland Park Junior College (HPJC) and graduated from Wayne State University with a BFA. Harris's formal arts education was in the conventional European-influenced mode dominant in universities at the time, and Richard Diebenkorn's paintings are an influence. However, she also draws inspiration from African arts and design, African American culture and tradition, and a wide range of artists such as Romare Bearden and Raymond Saunders. Bearden especially interested Harris, because he was the first artist she saw depicting Black life almost exclusively in an abstract style, which made it more powerful to her.

== Design career ==
Harris did not want to depend on selling her art to make a living for herself, so she worked a "day job" for over 30 years as a commercial designer, specializing in architecture and interiors. She designed for several Detroit firms, including Nathan Johnson and Associates, where she became Director of interior design in 1974. Frustrated at seeing white co-workers advancing faster than her while she worked just as hard, Harris decided to found her own firm, which she called Interior Planning and Design. She served as president there until retiring in 2008, designing for clients including the Museum of African American History, Wayne County Community College, and Detroit Public Schools among others.

== Quilting and artistic process ==
Harris loves the touch and feel of working with fabric, and finds that she can accomplish anything with this medium that she could with paint. Harris has called her use of quilting "very personal" and necessary channel for expressing her impressions of the world. She began with traditional quilts, but she eventually tired of "the sameness and predictability" of patterning. Experimenting with quilting's more conventional forms led Harris to a distinct compositional style—part improvisation, part designed patterning—that blends painting, African American quilting, and African textile art. Her work has also been referred to as "assemblages" or "constructions" given the way they frequently break from the traditional rectangular form of a quilt into uniquely shaped forms. Her compositions are also architectural, as she pushes the boundaries of quilt construction into three-dimensional space.

Harris is also known for fine detail work, often including embroidery into her compositions. Harris often begins a piece with a sketch or a beginning of an idea, then works improvisationally with her materials to catch onto related motifs and ideas from her consciousness. She has connected her experimental modes of discovery with those of other forms of art invigorated by improvisation: literature, dance, and music, especially jazz. This practice often results in a small study tacking together very tiny collections of scraps, which can evolve into very large pieces. Harris keeps all of her scraps of material and thread, to recycle into future art work.

== Signature style ==
Harris's work is largely non-representational, inspired by African methods of art-making that emphasize rhythm, pattern, and other modes of non-literal artistic expression. She also uses African-made cloth in her work, often in ways that emphasize patterning and abstraction. Harris cites music and its concepts of "motion, rhythm, and harmony" as being fundamental to her aesthetic, particularly Black diasporic forms such as jazz, spirituals, and Hip Hop, and the titles of many of her artworks reflect this musical influence. Harris has also said that she "sees in strips," in reference to the patterns she notices in the world as well as how she constructs many of her pieces, a process that has resonance in kente cloth from Ghana, kuba cloth from Zaire, and the Hausa art of strip embroidery.

Harris is also known for her love of jewel-toned colors, especially magenta and orange, something that she traces back to a favorite art teacher of hers in junior college, Mrs. Cyril Miles, who used magenta and purple yarn to pull her hair back into a bun. This professor also influenced and inspired Harris by showing her an example of someone whose art blended with her everyday life and the design of her home. Black is also a key color in Harris's artworks, rearticulated as a "positive space," a resting space akin to a pause in a musical composition, rather than as the "negative space" it is often described as in European-American art traditions. She considers these large swaths of single color as a form of balance in her compositions to the multicolored fabric sections, and they are often heavily quilted and textured.

== Influence of Detroit ==
Critics see important linkages between Harris's art and her lifelong hometown of Detroit, particularly the way that Harris's work visibly emphasizes labor, rhythm, patterning, and assembly—all key elements of an industrial city driven by factory work for much of the 20th century. She has lived in the city her entire life and continues to represent the Detroit arts scene globally. In November 2024, Harris traveled to Paris, France with over 50 Detroit artists, curators, and other arts personnel as ambassadors for new arts initiatives in the city. As she told the Michigan Chronicle, "Detroit has been the subject of so much derision and negativity for far too many years. To be there, exhibiting our work, and representing the city in a positive way to a global audience in an official capacity was beyond anything I ever imagined."

== Themes of artwork ==
One theme throughout Harris's career is the passage of time and its impact on people, materials, and memory. Her methods and compositions work with ideas of decay and aging as well as the impulse and ability to mend and renew. She collect and uses old garments in her work, exploring how colors change, run, and fade as well as the enduring relationships people have with clothes over their lifetimes.

Many of Harris's quilt compositions are cityscapes, such as View from the Kitchen on Preston Street (1999) and landscapes, like Down the Road a Piece (2003). Others explore aspects of movement and dance, as in Something like a Jitterbug (1994), that connects forms of African American dance to Yoruba Egungun practices.

== Arts career and accomplishments ==
In 1990, Harris started a quilt series in honor of the release of Nelson Mandela from imprisonment in South Africa that she titled Memory. In 1992, Harris's work was part of an art exhibition by the Kentucky Quilt Project called Always There: The African-American Presence in American Quilts that presented a history of African American quilting from the time of enslavement to the contemporary moment. This show traveled to 8 more museums across the United States. In 1997, Harris showed in A Communion of the Spirits exhibition, a traveling national survey of African American quiltmaking curated by Roland Freeman. She was invited to create an ornament for the White House Christmas tree during the Clinton administration.

The election of Barack Obama to the presidency in 2008 inspired Harris to make a quilt entitled O + C=44, in reference to Obama being elected the 44th president on a platform of "change." The quilt breaks with her usual color palate, using Obama's campaign colors, and references the American flag in its strip piecing. Harris's quilt was part of a grassroots artistic movement to document Obama's election and the feelings it stirred in the nation. In 2013, Harris's artwork was featured prominently in an international art show entitled The Sum of Many Parts: 25 Quiltmakers in 21st Century America that travelled to the Guangxi Museum of Nationalities in Nanning, Guangxi, where she guest lectured at the show's opening. Harris was awarded an artistic fellowship from Kresge Arts in Detroit in 2015.
