= Islamophobia/Islamophilia =

2010 book edited by Andrew Shryock

Islamophobia/Islamophilia: Beyond the Politics of Enemy and Friend is a 2010 book edited by Andrew Shryock, published by Indiana University Press.

Schryock argues that Islamophilia and Islamophobia both come from a similar logic in Western cultures.

The book originated from the first conference of the Islamic Studies Institute (ISI), which was held in 2007 at the University of Michigan.

== Background ==
The editor, Andrew Schryock, is a codirector of the ISI and an Associate Professor of Anthropology of the University of Michigan.

== Contents ==
The editor wrote the introduction. As the ISI is based in the United States, over half of the content is related to the U.S., and there is one chapter each about France and Germany, as well as content about Lebanon. Zareena A. Grewal of Yale University wrote that the wide amount of social settings and topics covered by the book is "One of the great strengths". The book is divided into multiple parts.

Part I, "Continuities and Transformations":

- An essay by Tomaž Mastnak - Stated that modern Islamophobia originates from a historical trajectory, stemming from anti-Muslim sentiment held by European Christians
- An essay by Naamah Paley - Discusses the Khalil Gibran International Academy in New York City; even though the school was secular, criticism was focused on a Yemeni American principal

Part II, "Modern (Self) Criticism"

- "The God That Failed" by Moustafa Bayoumi - In the essay he criticizes people who he refers to as neo-Orientalists, including Reza Aslan, Ayaan Hirsi Ali, and Irshad Manji; he accuses them of taking advantage of prejudices already held by Western audiences.
- "Gendering Islamophobia and Islamophilia: The Case of Shi‘i Muslim Women in Lebanon" by Lara Deeb - Discusses Hezbollah-affiliated gender activists, who reside in southern Beirut, and how they face accusations of an Islamophobic character from Sunni Muslims and Christians.
- "Bridging Traditions: Madrasas and Their Internal Critics" by Muhammad Qasim Zaman - Discusses madrassas in the Middle East and South Asia, and Muslim intellectual critiques of them

Part III, "Violence and Conversion in Europe"

- "The Fantasy and Violence of Religious Imagination" by Paul Silverstein - Discusses French Muslims, and Franco-Maghrebians, and French colonial history and attitudes.
- "German Converts to Islam and Their Ambivalent Relations with Immigrant Muslims" by Esra Özyürek - Discusses Muslim converts in Berlin, and how they nonetheless had negative attitudes towards Turkish Germans even though they were fellow Muslims

Part IV, "Attraction and Revulsion in Shared Space" - Discusses U.S. and Canadian Islamophobia

- "Competing for Muslims: New Strategies for Urban Renewal" by Sally Howell - Discusses school reform in Detroit, Michigan
- An essay by Mucahit Bilici in which he discusses ethnic comedy

Carol Fadda-Conrey of Syracuse University wrote that "What these essays in Islamophobia/Islamophilia make evident, both individually and collectively, is that the discourse of hate and love mobilized in constructions of Muslims as enemies and friends should be examined, and challenged, within the specific historical, local, and political frameworks from which they emerge."

== Reception ==
Grewal stated that "Overall, the volume is an impressive collection of serious discursive analyses that heighten our sensitivities to the forms arguments about Islam take".

Ian Law of the School of Sociology and Social Policy of the University of Leeds stated that the book was an "excellent collection" that "contains vivid case study material" and that "should be recognized for both its new approach to theorizing the complex and ambivalent relations between Muslims and non-Muslims, and for advancing our understanding of how to move forward in this field."

Juliane Hammer of the University of North Carolina at Chapel Hill wrote that the book successfully integrates the individual essays together, and that the book is "highly recommended for a range of scholars and students in disciplines interested in identity construction, dynamics of media representations, the interplay of religious self-understanding, praxis, and public perception, and the implications of "Islam and modernity" discourses in contemporary global politics.
