= George Washington Carver Academy =

Public school

Coordinates: 42°24′29.9″N 83°06′08.3″W

George Washington Carver Academy is a public PreKindergarten-8 charter school in Highland Park, Michigan in Metro Detroit.

It is located in a former Farmer Jack supermarket. It is named after George Washington Carver.

== History ==
A Highland Park teacher named Birdlene Esselman established it in 1999. Mark Binelli wrote in The New York Times that Esselman was "beloved". The for-profit company Mosaica Education initially operated the school, acting as an Educational Management Organization (EMO).

The charter school was initially authorized by Highland Park Schools, the local school district.

In 2000 it entered into a mortgage for funds used to pay $7.1 million to acquire the school's current campus. Michigan law does not require for leasing or property acquisition for charter schools to be in fair market value and Binelli stated that the resulting real estate prices paid by the schools are "wildly inflated". In 2017 Oak Ridge Capital employee Scott VanderWerp stated that due to the high area crime rates and poor conditions of area buildings, "I think you’d readily agree that that building and land isn’t worth $5- or $6 million. Quite candidly, it’s probably worth $500,000 or $600,000."

The school's 2008 mathematics and English standardized test scores for 4th grade students were invalidated after cheating had been discovered. Several teachers had given improper assistance during tests and had opened test packets prior to the designated times.

As of 2016 it is managed by Midwest Management Group. That year it changed its authorizer to Bay Mills Community College out of concern that the Highland Park school district may collapse.

Sylvia Brown, who came from Highland Park and resided in a suburban community, became the principal in fall 2016.

In 2017 the school was still paying the loan made in 2000.

== Operations ==
In 2016 the state government of Michigan paid $7,300 to the school for each enrolled student. The authorizer took about 3% of the per-student funds.

== Facility ==
The building has a capacity of 650. Binelli stated that the building was in poor repair as the school lacked the funds to do maintenance. Around that year the school was in the process of refinancing its debt with oversight from a for-profit creditor, Oak Ridge Financial. Binelli wrote that Oak Ridge "was performing the sort of oversight normally handled by a school district."

== Student body ==
It had about 560 students in 2016, and about 550 in 2017.

== Performance ==
In mid-2017 the Michigan Department of Education ranked the school's performance in the lowest percentile.

In 2017 Binelli wrote that "Carver probably isn’t the sort of institution where most school-choice proponents would send their own children." Regarding the proliferation of charter schools, Binelli concluded that "The story of Carver is the story of Michigan’s grand educational experiment writ small."

== Student discipline ==
In 2013 the school participated in the "Students for Peace" competition in order to reduce the amount of fighting on campus; in 2012 91% of the students had received suspensions because they participated in fighting.

== See also ==
- List of public school academy districts in Michigan
