= Mucahit Bilici =

Turkish American sociologist

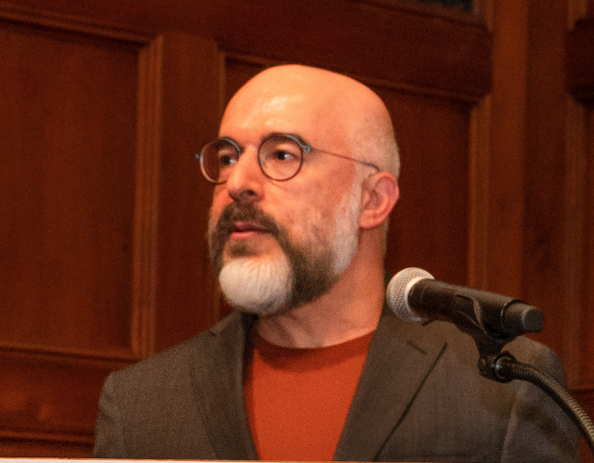
Mucahit Bilici
- Born: Silvan, Diyarbakir, Turkey
- Occupations: Sociologist, Columnist
- Writing career
- Notable works: Finding Mecca in America, Hamal Kürt

Mucahit Bilici is an American Muslim sociologist, columnist and Kurdish public intellectual. His notable works are Hamal Kürt and Finding Mecca in America: How Islam Is Becoming an American Religion (University of Chicago Press, 2012). He is professor of sociology at John Jay College, City University of New York and CUNY Graduate Center. Mucahit Bilici is also Academic Director at Zahra Institute, Chicago.

== Publications ==
- Following Similar Paths: What American Jews and Muslims Can Learn from One Another [co-authored with S. Heilman] (University of California Press, 2024
- Finding Mecca in America: How Islam Is Becoming an American Religion (University of Chicago Press, 2012)

=== Books in Turkish ===
- Hamal Kürt: Türk İslamı ve Kürt Sorunu [Kurd, the Porter: Turkish Islam and the Kurdish Question]. Istanbul: Avesta, 2017. [Turkish], 264 pages. (4th edition)
- Bir Isme Tutunmak [Clinging to a Name]. Istanbul: Hivda. 2017. [Turkish], 136 pages.
- İslamda Savaş Bitmiştir [War is Over in Islam]. Istanbul: Avesta, 2016. [Turkish], 112 pages.

=== Articles/Book Chapters ===
- Bilici, Mucahit. 2025. “İsmet Özel: Bir Dava Adamının Aktif Nihilizmi” [İsmet Özel: The Active Nihilism of a True Radical], Tezkire Dergisi, Issue 94, (2025) [Turkish]
- Bilici, Mucahit. 2023. “Xanî’nin Agon’u” [Xanî's Agon], Dogu Bati Dergisi, Issue 101, (January 2023) [Turkish]
- Bilici, Mucahit. 2022. “Turkish Islam and Kurdish Difference,” HAU: Journal of Ethnographic Theory, 12:(1)
- Bilici, Mucahit. 2022. “Middle Eastern Muslims and the Ethical Inclusion of America as a New Homeland” In Handbook of Sociology and the Middle East, eds. F. M. Gocek and G. Evcimen. London: IB Tauris.
- Bilici, Mucahit. 2021. “Teolojide Regicide: Tanri’nin Kellesini Almak” [“Regicide in Theology: Beheading God”], Pasajlar: Sosyal Bilimler Dergisi, Issue 8, (September 2021) [Turkish]
- Bilici, Mucahit. 2021. “Ehmedê Xanî’s Political Philosophy in Mem û Zîn” in Kurds and Yezidis in the Middle East: Shifting Identities, Borders and the Experience of Minority Communities, ed. G. M. Tezcur. London: IB Tauris.
- Bilici, Mucahit. 2021. “Kürtlerin Esitlik Mücadelesi ve Milliyetçilik” [“Nationalism and the Kurdish Struggle for Equality”] in Ne Mutlu Esitim Diyene: Milliyetcilik Tartismalari [The Nationalism Debates in Turkey], eds. Yasemin Congar, et al. Istanbul: Kiraathane. [Turkish]
- Bilici, Mucahit. 2020. “Kurds between Ethnicity and Universalist Ideologies,” Kurt Arastirmalari / Kurdish Studies 3 (May 2020)
- Bilici, Mucahit. 2019. “Muslims and the American Constitution: From the First Amendment to the Second?” In Muslims and US Politics Today: A Defining Moment, ed. M. H. Khalil. Harvard University Press, Mizan Series.
- Bilici, Mucahit. 2018. “Said Nursi: Dehanin Ehlilestirilmesi ve Imanizm” [“Said Nursi: Domestication of Genius and Reform in Islam”] in Kürt Tarihi ve Siyasetinden Portreler [Portraits in Kurdish History and Politics], eds. Y. Cakmak and T. Sur. Istanbul: Iletisim Yayinlari. [Turkish]
- Bilici, Mucahit. 2011. "Homeland Insecurity: How Immigrant Muslims Naturalize America in Islam," Comparative Studies in Society and History (53:3).
- Bilici, Mucahit. 2011. "Being Targeted, Being Recognized: The Impact of 9/11 on Arab and Muslim Americans," Contemporary Sociology (40:2) [review essay].
- Bilici, Mucahit. 2010. "Muslim Ethnic Comedy: Inversions of Islamophobia," in Islamophobia/Islamophilia: Beyond the Politics of Enemy and Friend, A. Shryock, (ed.), Indiana University Press.
- Bilici, Mucahit. 2008. "Said Nursi's Moral Philosophy," Islam and Christian-Muslim Relations (19:1), January.
- Bilici, Mucahit. 2007. "Conversion out of Islam: A Study of Conversion Narratives of Former Muslims" (with M. Khalil) The Muslim World, January 2007.
- Bilici, Mucahit. 2006. "Ummah and Empire: Global Formations after Nation," pp. 313–327, in Blackwell Companion to Contemporary Islamic Thought, Oxford, UK: Blackwell Publishing.
