= William & Vashti College =

Coordinates: 41°12′27.1″N 90°45′11.5″W

William & Vashti College was a college in Aledo, Illinois, United States, from 1908 to 1918.

The school was founded by William Drury and was named by him in his will as William and Vashti College to commemorate the memory of him and his wife, Vashti Lewis. By the terms of the will the school was to be located in that city or town of Mercer County which would offer the largest bonus for its location. The city of Aledo, having offered more than any other locality in the county, secured the school. The purpose of Mr. Drury was to found a non-denominational school where the student could not only secure a complete classical or scientific education, but where he could also secure such practical instruction as would fit him for some particular employment. A campus of about 16 acres was acquired and the main college building, a boys' dormitory, a gymnasium, a heating plant and residence for the president were erected.

Tuition in 1917 was $29.50. World War I though was being fought in Europe (1914–1918) and the United States began conscription (a draft in 1917). Although enrollment had rapidly increased in the early years of William & Vashti College, the loss of students was a factor in its demise. Of particular significance, Vashti Lewis put her name on a private college in 1908, twelve years before women had the right to vote in the United States. The college was co-ed.

Aledo High School used the main instructional building on campus for one year. A fire had destroyed Aledo High School, a wood structure. A new brick Aledo High School was built in 1922.

The William and Vashti campus and buildings were purchased in 1924 when fire destroyed the Kansas Military Academy during the school year. Hearing of the available campus they quickly relocated to Aledo and used by the Roosevelt Military Academy from 1924 to 1973. The Administration Building was torn down and the spot was used for apartments for the disabled and elderly. The remaining two RMA buildings, Niles Hall and North Hall, were razed in 2018.

William & Vashti was a member of Illinois Intercollegiate Athletic Conference.
