= Jon H. Roberts =

American historian

- Born: Jon Harlan Roberts

Academic background
- Education: University of Missouri; Harvard University
- Thesis: The Impact of Darwinism on American Protestant Theology, 1859–1890 (1980)

Academic work
- Discipline: History
- Sub-discipline: American history; ecclesiastical history; history of science; intellectual history
- Institutions: Harvard University; University of Wisconsin–Stevens Point; Boston University

Jon Harlan Roberts is an American historian and the Tomorrow Foundation Professor of History at Boston University.

== Education and career ==
Roberts graduated in 1969 from the University of Missouri. He continued his education at Harvard University, earning a master's degree in 1970 and completing his PhD in 1980.

He continued at Harvard as an assistant professor of history until 1985, when he moved to the University of Wisconsin–Stevens Point. He earned tenure there in 1988 and was promoted to full professor in 1995. In 2001 he moved again to Boston University and in 2007 he was named the Tomorrow Foundation Professor.

== Selected publications ==
Roberts is the author or coauthor of books including:

- Darwinism and the Divine in America: Protestant Intellectuals and Organic Evolution, 1859–1900 (University of Wisconsin Press, 1988). ISBN 978-0-299-11590-6.
- The Sacred and the Secular University (with James Turner, Princeton University Press, 2020)

He is co-editor of Science Without God?: Rethinking the History of Scientific Naturalism (with Peter Harrison, Oxford University Press, 2019)
