= Big Four Conference (Wisconsin) =

The Big Four Conference was an intercollegiate athletic conference that existed in Wisconsin from 1923 and 1932.

== Football champions ==
- 1923: Unknown
- 1924: Unknown
- 1925: Carroll (WI)
- 1926: Carroll (WI)
- 1927: Carroll (WI)
- 1928: Carroll (WI)
- 1929: Ripon
- 1930: Carroll (WI)
- 1931: Ripon
- 1932: Ripon

== Basketball champions ==
- 1929–30: Carroll (WI)
- 1930–31: Carroll (WI)

== See also ==
- List of defunct college football conferences
