= Esra Özyürek =

Turkish anthropologist

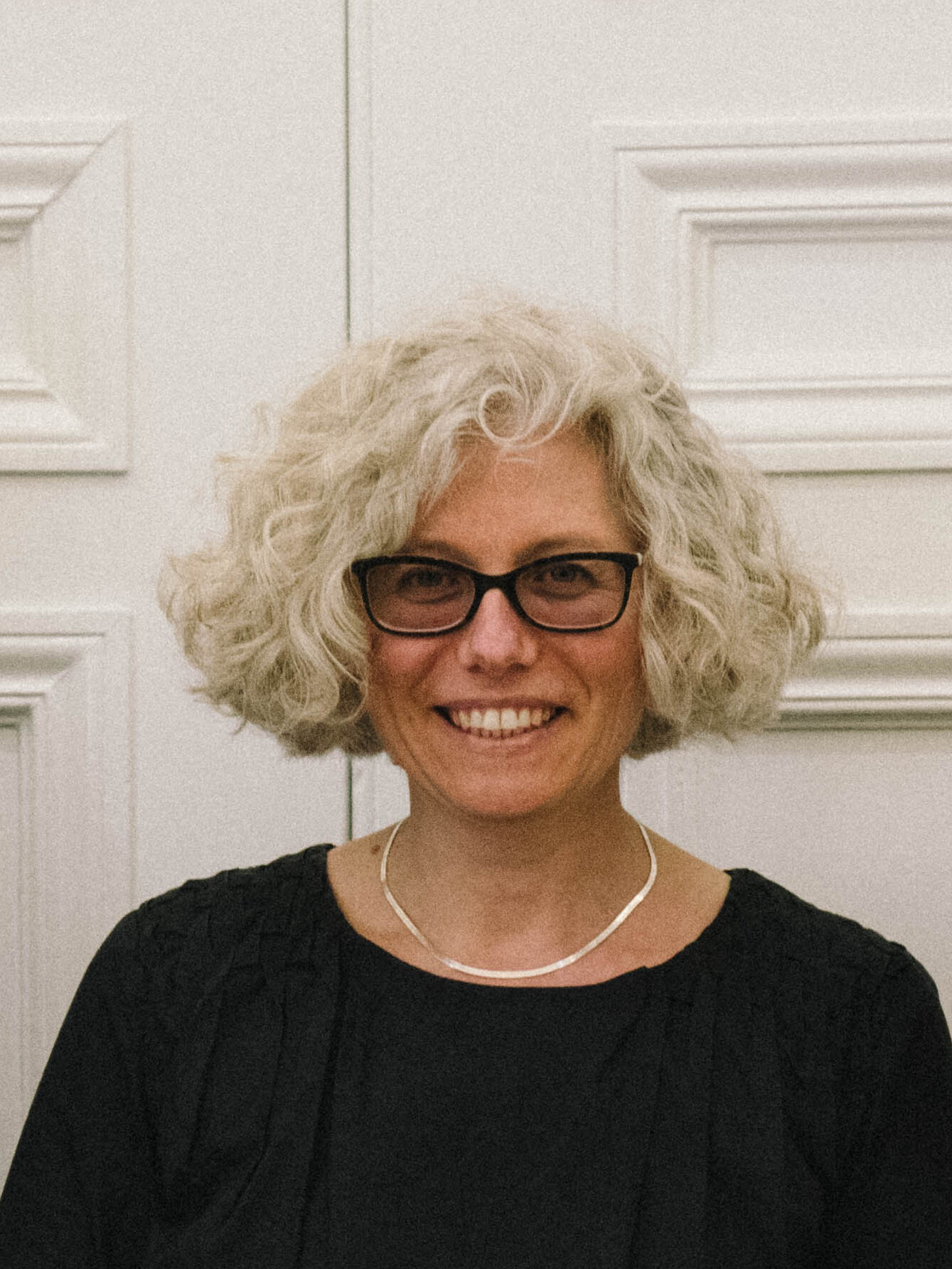
- April 2019, Boston University

Academic background
- Education: Boğaziçi University (undergraduate); University of Michigan (master's and doctorate)

Academic work
- Institutions: University of Cambridge (2020–present); London School of Economics; UC San Diego; University of Michigan
- Notable works: Nostalgia for the Modern (2007); Being German, Becoming Muslim (2014); Subcontractors of Guilt (2023)
- Website: https://www.divinity.cam.ac.uk/directory/professor-esra-ozyurek

Esra Özyürek is the Sultan Qaboos Professor of Abrahamic Religions and Shared Values at the Faculty of Divinity, University of Cambridge, and the Academic Director of the Cambridge Interfaith Programme. Working in the field of sociocultural anthropology, Özyürek examines religion, memory, secularism, and migration in the contexts of Turkey and Europe.

== Education ==
Esra Özyürek completed her undergraduate education in the Department of Sociology and Political Science at Boğaziçi University. She then pursued doctoral studies in anthropology at the University of Michigan, Ann Arbor.

== Academic career ==
After completing her doctorate, Esra Özyürek served as a faculty member at the University of California, San Diego. She subsequently held the positions of Professor of European Anthropology and Chair of the Contemporary Turkish Studies Programme at the London School of Economics (LSE).

As of October 1, 2020, she joined the Faculty of Divinity at the University of Cambridge, taking up the Sultan Qaboos Professorship in Abrahamic Religions and Shared Values. She simultaneously became the Academic Director of the Cambridge Interfaith Programme. She is also a Fellow of Fitzwilliam College.

== Research areas ==
Özyürek's research examines the transformations that universalist religious and value systems (such as Islam, Christianity, secularism, liberalism, and democracy) undergo as they are carried into different social and geographic contexts. She focuses in particular on the experiences of individuals who adopt an ideology or belief system they did not inherit from their families.

== Works ==
=== Books ===
Özyürek's first monograph, Nostalgia for the Modern: State Secularism and Everyday Politics in Turkey, was published by Duke University Press in 2007. It examines through ethnographic methods the effects of state secularism on everyday life practices in Turkey.

Her second book, Being German, Becoming Muslim: Race, Religion and Conversion in the New Europe, was published by Princeton University Press in 2014. The book addresses the processes by which ethnic German citizens convert to Islam in contemporary Europe, and the intersection of this process with race and national identity.

In 2023 Özyürek's book Subcontractors of Guilt: Holocaust Memory and Muslim Belonging in Postwar Germany was published by Stanford University Press. Based on a decade of fieldwork, the book interrogates how and why Muslim Germans have come to be placed at the center of Germany's Holocaust memory culture. Özyürek argues that German society has "subcontracted" the guilt stemming from the Holocaust onto its new minority migrants. A German translation of the book, titled Stellvertreter der Schuld, translated by Elsbeth Ranke, was published by Klett-Cotta in 2025.

=== Edited volumes ===
- Politics of Public Memory: Production and Consumption of the Past in Turkey (Syracuse University Press, 2007)
- Authoritarianism and Resistance in Turkey (Springer Verlag, 2018) (co-edited with Gaye Özpınar and Emrah Altındiş)
