= Highland Park Community College =

College in Michigan, United States

- Former name: Highland Park Junior College
- Type: Junior (1918 - ?); Community (? - 1996)
- Active: 1918–1996
- Location: Highland Park, Michigan

Highland Park Community College, formerly Highland Park Junior College, was a public community college located in Highland Park, Michigan. Highland Park Community College was an urban campus and the focus of many efforts to benefit urban populations.

== History ==
The college was founded in 1918 as Highland Park Junior College.

On May 21, 1954, the college has its radio station, WHPR-FM, sign on.

The college sold its radio station to R.J. Watkins Late Night Entertainment. The school was closed in 1996. The Highland Park Career Academy was brought in to replace it.

Robert Elmes bought the campus for $18,000.

== Programs ==
Among other programs the college had a nursing program. WHPR-FM was originally run by Highland Park Community College.

== Alumni ==
Among the alumni of Highland Park Community College is Michigan State Senator Martha G. Scott as well as Detroit activist General Baker, Jr., and Radio Announcer, Karla Fox formerly of WJZZ/WCHB, Smooth Jazz V-98.7, Mix 92.3, WJLB, Radio One and other Broadcast Companies. Textile artist and interior designer Carole Harris is an alum, as is her husband, writer Bill Harris.
