= List of Detroit Public Schools =

This is a list of schools operated by Detroit Public Schools.

== Schools ==
=== Pre-kindergarten through 12 schools ===
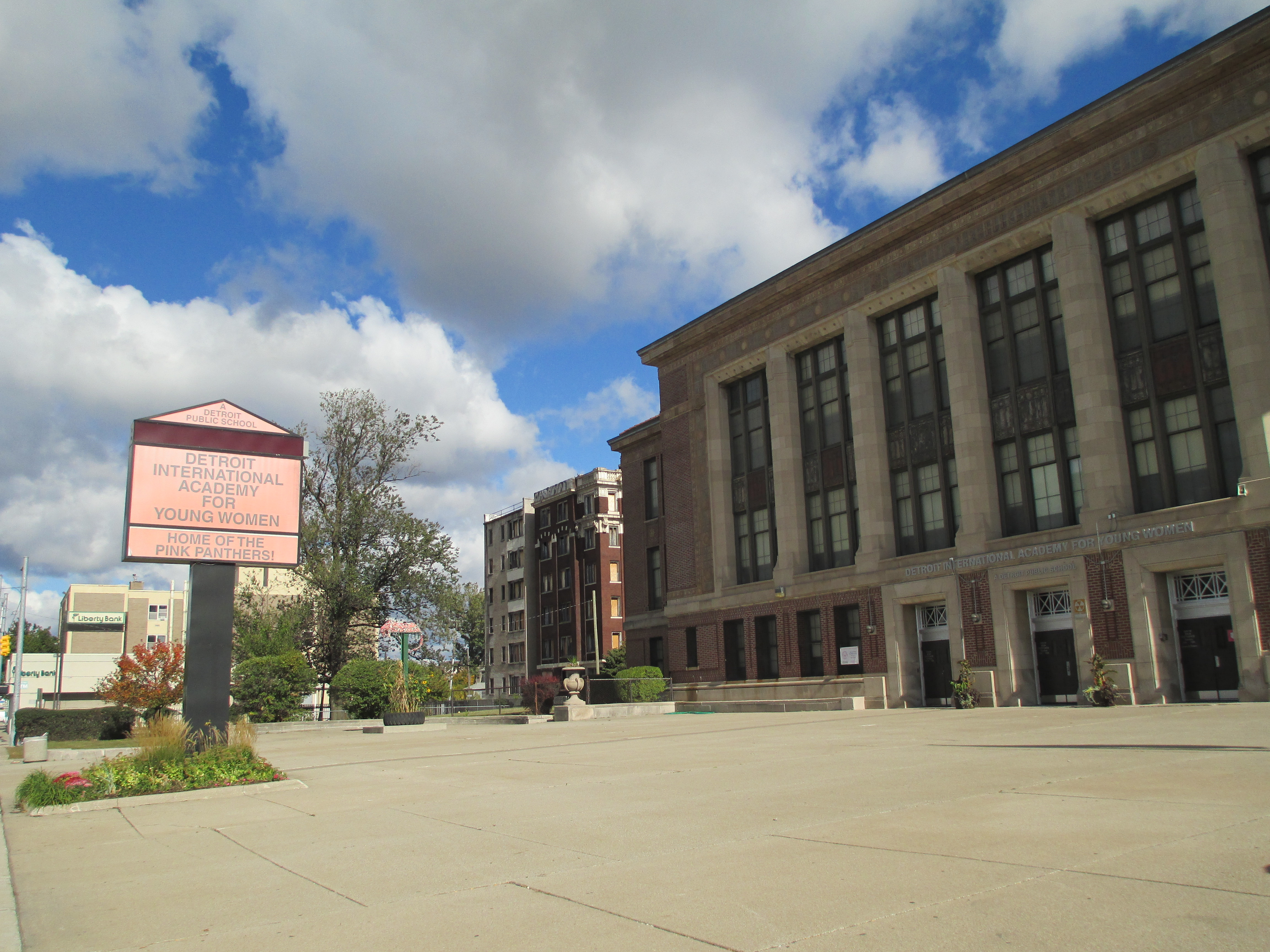
Detroit International Academy for Young Women

- Academy of the Americas, 3811 Cicotte (Cub Campus) 5680 Konkel (Tiger Campus)
- Detroit International Academy for Young Women, 5161 Charles Street
- The School at Marygrove, 16661 Greenlawn Street

=== 6-12 ===
- Detroit Lions Academy (Alternative Education)

=== High schools ===
==== Zoned high schools ====
- Central High School, 2425 Tuxedo Street
- Frank Cody High School, 18445 Cathedral Street
- Denby Technical & Preparatory High School, 12800 Kelly Road
- East English Village Preparatory Academy, 5020 Cadieux Road
- Ford High School, 20000 Evergreen Road
- Martin Luther King Jr. Senior High School (formerly Eastern High School), 3200 East Lafayette Street
- Mumford High School, 17525 Wyoming Street
- Northwestern High School, 2200 W Grand Boulevard
- Pershing High School, 18875 Ryan Road
- Southeastern High School
- Western International High School, 3030 Fairview Street

==== Optional high schools ====
- Cass Technical High School, 2501 2nd Avenue
- Communication & Media Arts High School, 19051 Berg Rd
- Crocket Midtown High School of Science & Medicine, 571 Mack Avenue
- Davis Aerospace High School at Golightly, 900 Dickerson Street
- Detroit School of Arts, 123 Selden Street
- Frederick Douglas Academy for Young Men, 9026 Woodward Ave
- Osborn High School, 11600 East 7 Mile Road
- Renaissance High School, 6565 West Outer Drive

=== Alternative Education ===
- Jerry L. White Center

=== PreK-8 schools ===
==== Zoned PreK-8 schools ====
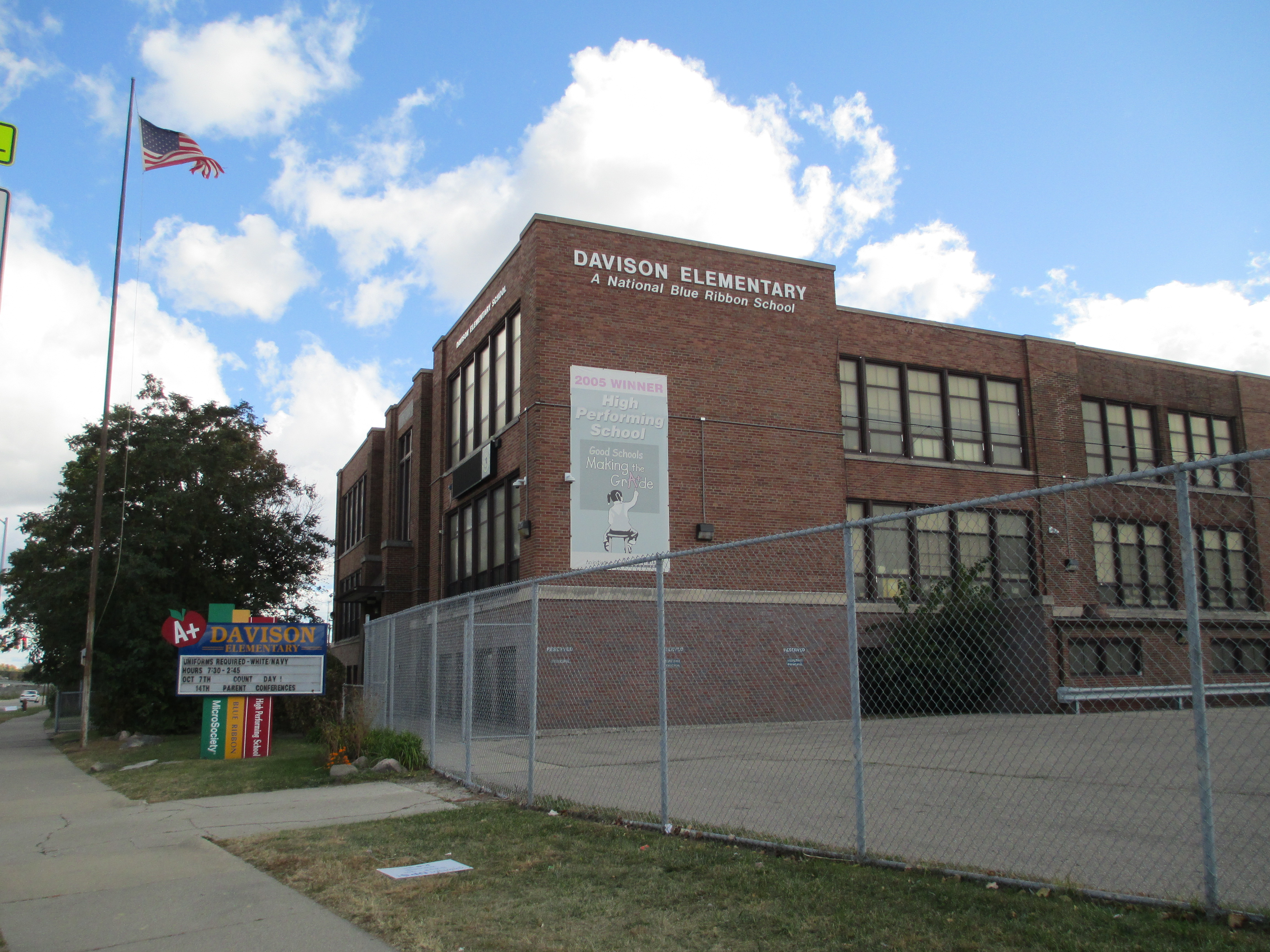
Davison Elementary-Middle School

- Bates Academy, 19701 Wyoming Street
- Mary McLeod Bethune Elementary/Middle School, 8145 Puritan Street
- Bow Elementary/Middle School, 19801 Prevost Street
- Beulah Brewer Academy, 18025 Brock Street
- Ronald Brown Academy (formerly Stellwagen Elementary School), 11530 East Outer Drive
- Ralph J. Bunche Preparatory Academy (formerly Smith Elementary School), 2715 Macomb Street
- Burns Elementary-Middle School, 14350 Terry Street
- Burton International Academy, 2001 Martin Luther King Jr. Boulevard
- Cartsens Elementary/Middle School, 13000 Essex Avenue
- Carver STEM Academy, 18701 Paul Street
- Davison Elementary/Middle School, 2800 East Davison Street
- Dixon Educational Learning Academy, 8401 Trinity Street
- Earheart Elementary/Middle School, 1000 Scotten Street
- Emerson Elementary/Middle School, 18240 Huntington Road
- Garvey Academy, 2301 Van Dyke Street
- Golightly Education Center (formerly Saleh Elementary School), 5536 Saint Antoine Street
- Gompers Elementary/Middle School, 14450 Burt Road
- Erma Henderson Academy, 16101 West Chicago Street
- A.L. Holmes Academy of Blended Learning, 8950 Crane Street
- Hutchinson Elementary/Middle School (formerly Howe Elementary School), 2600 Garland Street
- John R. King Academic and Parforming Arts Academy, 15850 Strathmoor Street
- Paul Robeson Malcolm X Academy, 14771 Manfield Street
- Marion Law Academy, 19411 Cliff Street
- Mackenzie Elementary/Middle School, 10147 West Chicago
- Thurgood Marshall Elementary School, 15531 Linwood Street, Grades 1-8
- Marquette Elementary/Middle School, 6145 Canyon Street
- Neinas Dual Language Learning Academy, 6021 Mcmillan Street
- Noble Elementary/Middle School, 8646 Fullerton Street
- Nolan Elementary/Middle School, 1150 East Lantz Street
- Palmer Park Preparatory Academy (formerly Hampton Elementary School), 3901 Margareta Street
- Priest Elementary/Middle School, 7840 Wagner Street
- Pulaski Elementary/Middle School, 13840 Lappin Street
- Sampson-Webber Leadership Academy,4700 Tireman Ave
- Charles L. Spain Elementary/Middle School, 3700 Beaubien Street
- Mark Twain Elementary/Middle School, 12800 Visger Street
- Vernor Elementary/Middle School, 13726 Pembroke Avenue

==== Alternative PreK-8 schools ====
- Brenda Scott Academy for Theatre Arts, 18440 Hoover Street
- Edward 'Duke' Ellington Conversatory of Music & Art at Beckham Academy, 9860 Park Drive

=== K-8 schools ===
==== Zoned K-8 schools ====
- Burns Elementary/Middle School, 14350 Terry Street
- Dossin Elementary/Middle School, 16650 Glendale Street
- Durfee Elementary/Middle School, 2425 Tuxedo Street
- Earhart Elementary/Middle School, 1000 Scotten Street
- Munger Elementary/Middle School, 5525 Martin Street
- Nichols Elementary/Middle School, 3000 Burns Street
- Nolan Elementary/Middle School, 1150 East Lantz Street
- Schulze Academy for Technology and Arts, 10700 Santa Maria Street
- Thirkell Elementary/Middle School, 7724 14th Street

==== Alternative K-8 schools ====
- Moses Field Center, 9330 Shoemaker Street (temporary)
- Foreign Language Immersion and Cultural Studies, 6501 West Outer Drive

=== 5–8 schools ===
(zoned)

- Clippert Multicultural Honors Academy (was McKinstry Elementary School), 1981 Mckinstry Street

=== PK-6 schools ===
(zoned)

- Bagley Elementary School of Journalism and Technology, 8100 Curtis Street, Grades PreK-7
- Cooke STEM Academy, 18800 Puritan Street
- Pasteur Elementary School, 19811 Stoepel Street

=== K-6 schools ===
(zoned)

- Pasteur Elementary, 19811 Stoepel Street

=== PreK-5 schools ===
(zoned)

- Bennett Elementary School, 2111 Mullane Street
- Carleton Elementary School, 11724 Casino Street
- Roberto Clemente Learning Academy, 1551 Beard Street
- Maybury Elementary School, 4410 Porter Street
- Wayne Elementary School, 10633 Courville Street
- Coleman A. Young Elementary School (formerly Stratford Elementary School), 15771 Hubbell Street

=== PreK-5 schools ===
(optional)

- Fisher Magnet Academy, 15510 East State Fair Avenue

=== K-5 schools ===
(zoned)

- Chrysler Elementary School, 1445 East Lafayette Street
- Gardner Elementary School, 6528 Mansfield Street
- Harms Elementary School, 2400 Central Street

== Former schools ==
- See: List of closed public schools in Detroit
