= Detroit Public School League =

High school conference

The Detroit Public School League (PSL) is a high school conference based in the city of Detroit, Michigan and is governed by Detroit Public Schools (DPS) Office of Athletics. The PSL is affiliated with the MHSAA.

== Current members ==
School	Nickname	Colors	Enrollment	Class
Detroit Ben Carson			390	C
Detroit Cass Tech	Technicians		2,434	A
Detroit Central Collegiate	Trail Blazers		369	C
Detroit Cody	Comets		924	A
Detroit Collegiate Prep	Colts		581	B
Detroit Communication & Media Arts	Pharaohs		556	B
Detroit Davis Aerospace Tech	Aviators		166	D
Detroit Delta Prep	Pioneers		329	C
Detroit Denby	Tars		461	B
Detroit Douglass	Hurricanes		114	C
Detroit East English	Bulldogs		1,270	A
Detroit Edison Public School Academy	Pioneers		394	C
Detroit Henry Ford	Trojans		385	C
Detroit International Academy	Pink Panthers		202	C
Detroit Martin Luther King	Crusaders		1,404	A
Detroit Mumford	Mustangs		829	B
Detroit Osborn	Knights		607	B
Detroit Pershing	Doughboys		333	C
Detroit Renaissance	Phoenix		1,131	A
Detroit School of Arts	Achievers		386	C
Detroit Southeastern	Jungaleers		223	C
Detroit West Side Academy	Panthers		441	B
Detroit Western International	Cowboys/Cowgirls		1,701	A

=== Defunct high schools ===
- Detroit Crockett High School
- Detroit Chadsey High School
- Detroit Cooley High School
- Detroit City High School
- Detroit Finney High School
- Detroit Kettering High School
- Detroit Mackenzie High School
- Detroit Sidney D. Miller High School
- Detroit Murray–Wright High School
- Detroit Northeastern High School
- Detroit Northern High School
- Detroit Redford High School
- Detroit Southwestern High School

=== Notes ===
- Detroit Douglass is all boys while Detroit International Academy is all girls
- Detroit Ben Carson and Detroit School of Arts do not field sports teams of their own; Ben Carson co-ops with Douglass (boys sports) and International Academy (girls sports) while Detroit School of Arts co-ops with West Side Academy
- Detroit Delta Prep and Detroit Edison Academy are charter schools not affiliated with Detroit Public Schools
- Detroit Edison Academy is an independent in football as they did not want to play Cass Tech

== Sports ==
=== Boys ===
Baseball
Detroit Cass Tech
Detroit Central Collegiate
Detroit Cody
Detroit Collegiate Prep
Detroit Communication Media Arts
Detroit Denby
Detroit East English Village
Detroit Henry Ford
Detroit Martin Luther King
Detroit Mumford
Detroit Osborn
Detroit Pershing
Detroit Renaissance
Detroit Western International

Basketball
East Division I
Detroit Cass Tech
Detroit East English Village Prep
Detroit Martin Luther King
Detroit Pershing
Detroit Southeastern
West Division I
Detroit Cody
Detroit Henry Ford
Detroit Mumford
Detroit Renaissance
Detroit Western International
East Division II
Detroit Davis Aerospace Tech
Detroit Denby
Detroit Douglass
Detroit Osborn
West Division II
Detroit Central Collegiate
Detroit Collegiate Prep
Detroit Communication Media Arts
Detroit West Side Academy

Cross Country
East
Detroit Cass Tech
Detroit Davis Aerospace Tech
Detroit Denby
Detroit Douglass
Detroit East English Village
Detroit International Academy
Detroit Martin Luther King
Detroit Osborn
Detroit Pershing
Detroit Southeastern
West
Detroit Central Collegiate
Detroit Cody
Detroit Communication Media Arts
Detroit Henry Ford
Detroit Mumford
Detroit Renaissance
Detroit Western International
Detroit West Side Academy

Football
Black
Detroit Central Collegiate
Detroit Denby
Detroit Douglass
Detroit Martin Luther King
Detroit Pershing
Detroit Renaissance
Gold
Detroit Communication Media Arts
Detroit Delta Prep
Detroit East English Village
Detroit Osborn
Detroit Southeastern
Detroit Western International
Green
Detroit Cass Tech
Detroit Cody
Detroit Collegiate Prep
Detroit Edison Academy (independent)
Detroit Henry Ford
Detroit Mumford

Golf
Detroit Cass Tech
Detroit Collegiate Prep
Detroit Denby
Detroit East English Village
Detroit Martin Luther King
Detroit Pershing
Detroit Western International

Soccer
Detroit Cody
Detroit Denby
Detroit Pershing
Detroit Cass Tech
Detroit Douglass
Detroit Martin Luther King
Detroit Central Collegiate
Detroit Western International
Detroit Communication Media Arts
Detroit Mumford
Detroit Renaissance
Detroit Martin Luther King

Swimming/Diving
Detroit Cass Tech
Detroit Collegiate Prep
Detroit Communication Media Arts
Detroit Denby
Detroit East English Village
Detroit Henry Ford
Detroit Martin Luther King
Detroit Mumford
Detroit Renaissance
Detroit Western International

Tennis
Detroit Cass Tech
Detroit Collegiate Prep
Detroit Communication Media Arts
Detroit Denby
Detroit Henry Ford
Detroit Martin Luther King
Detroit Mumford
Detroit Osborn
Detroit Pershing

Track and Field
Detroit Central Collegiate
Detroit Osborn
Detroit Southeastern
Detroit Cass Tech
Detroit Denby
Detroit Pershing
Detroit East English Village
Detroit Martin Luther King
West
Detroit Cody
Detroit Collegiate Prep
Detroit Douglass
Detroit Mumford
Detroit Communication Media Arts
Detroit Henry Ford
Detroit Western International
Detroit Renaissance

Wrestling
Detroit Denby
Detroit Osborn
Detroit Pershing
Detroit Southeastern
Detroit Cass Tech
Detroit Central Collegiate
Detroit Douglass
Detroit Communication Media Arts
Detroit Western International
Detroit Cody
Detroit Ford
Detroit Mumford
Detroit Renaissance

=== Girls ===
Basketball
East Division I
Detroit East English Village Prep
Detroit Martin Luther King
Detroit Mumford
Detroit Pershing
Detroit Southeastern
West Division I
Detroit Cass Tech
Detroit Cody
Detroit Henry Ford
Detroit Renaissance
Detroit Western International
East Division II
Detroit Davis Aerospace Tech
Detroit Denby
Detroit International Academy
Detroit Osborn
West Division II
Detroit Central Collegiate
Detroit Collegiate Prep
Detroit Communication Media Arts
Detroit West Side Academy

Cross Country
East
Detroit Cass Tech
Detroit Collegiate Prep
Detroit Davis Aerospace Tech
Detroit Denby
Detroit East English Village
Detroit International Academy
Detroit Martin Luther King
Detroit Pershing
Detroit Southeastern
West
Detroit Central Collegiate
Detroit Cody
Detroit Communication Media Arts
Detroit Henry Ford
Detroit Mumford
Detroit Renaissance
Detroit Western International
Detroit West Side Academy

Golf
Detroit Cass Tech
Detroit Cody
Detroit Collegiate Prep
Detroit Communication Media Arts
Detroit Denby
Detroit East English Village
Detroit International Academy
Detroit Martin Luther King
Detroit Mumford
Detroit Osborn
Detroit Renaissance
Detroit Southeastern

Soccer
Detroit Cass Tech
Detroit Martin Luther King
Detroit Mumford
Detroit Renaissance
Detroit Western International

Softball
East
Detroit Cass Tech
Detroit Denby
Detroit East English Village
Detroit International Academy
Detroit Martin Luther King
Detroit Osborn
Detroit Pershing
Detroit Southeastern
West
Detroit Cody
Detroit Collegiate Prep
Detroit Communication Media Arts
Detroit Central Collegiate
Detroit Henry Ford
Detroit Mumford
Detroit Renaissance
Detroit Western International

Swimming/Diving
Detroit Cass Tech
Detroit Central Collegiate
Detroit Cody
Detroit Collegiate Prep
Detroit Communication Media Arts
Detroit Denby
Detroit East English Village
Detroit International Academy
Detroit Martin Luther King
Detroit Mumford
Detroit Renaissance
Detroit Southeastern
Detroit Western International

Tennis
Detroit Cass Tech
Detroit Collegiate Prep
Detroit Communication Media Arts
Detroit Denby
Detroit East English Village
Detroit Henry Ford
Detroit International Academy
Detroit Martin Luther King
Detroit Mumford
Detroit Osborn
Detroit Pershing
Detroit Renaissance

Track and Field
Detroit Cass Tech
Detroit Cody
Detroit Collegiate Prep
Detroit Communication Media Arts
Detroit Denby
Detroit Douglass
Detroit East English Village
Detroit Henry Ford
Detroit International Academy
Detroit Martin Luther King
Detroit Mumford
Detroit Osborn
Detroit Pershing
Detroit Renaissance
Detroit Southeastern
Detroit Western International

Volleyball
Detroit Cass Tech
Detroit Central Collegiate
Detroit Cody
Detroit Collegiate Prep
Detroit Communication Media Arts
Detroit Denby
Detroit East English Village
Detroit Henry Ford
Detroit International Academy
Detroit Martin Luther King
Detroit Mumford
Detroit Osborn
Detroit Pershing
Detroit Renaissance
Detroit Southeastern
Detroit Western International

== State Champions and Runners-up ==
From 1931-32 through 1960-61, league members did not participate in state championship competitions.

Detroit Cass Tech
1974 Boys Basketball Class A State Runner-Up
2016 Boys Football Division 1 State Champion
2015 Boys Football Division 1 State Runner-Up
2012 Boys Football Division 1 State Champion
2011 Boys Football Division 1 State Champion
2002 Boys Track Division 1 State Runner-Up
2001 Boys Track Division 1 State Runner-Up
1996 Boys Track Class A State Champion
1995 Boys Track Class A State Champion
1994 Boys Track Class A State Champion
1980 Boys Track Class A State Runner_up
1978 Boys Track Class A State Champion
1930 Boys Track Class A State Runner_up
1929 Boys Track Class A State Runner_up
1928 Boys Track Class A State Runner_up
1926 Boys Track Class A State Champion
1925 Boys Track Class A State Runner_up
1987 Girls Basketball Class A State Champion
2011 Girls Track Division1 State Runner_up
1998 Girls Track Class A State Runner_up
1997 Girls Track Class A State Runner_up
1996 Girls Track Class A State Runner_up
1995 Girls Track Class A State Champion
1994 Girls Track Class A State Champion
1993 Girls Track Class A State Champion
1992 Girls Track Class A State Champion
1991 Girls Track Class A State Runner_up
1989 Girls Track Class A State Runner_up
1988 Girls Track Class A State Runner_up
1987 Girls Track Class A State Runner_up
1986 Girls Track Class A State Runner_up
1985 Girls Track Class A State Runner_up
1976 Girls Track Class A State Champion
1975 Girls Track Class A State Champion
1974 Girls Track Class A-B State Champion

Detroit Central Collegiate
1998 Boys Basketball Class A State Champion
1984 Boys Track Class A State Champion
1982 Boys Track Class A State Champion
1981 Boys Track Class A State Champion
1980 Boys Track Class A State Champion
1974 Girls Track Class A-B State Runner_up

Detroit Cody
1981 Boys Class A Track State Runner_up

Detroit Collegiate Prep

Detroit Communication Media Arts
2000 Girls Basketball Class B State Runner-Up

Detroit Davis Aerospace

Detroit Denby

Detroit Douglass

Detroit East English Village

Detroit Henry Ford
2015 Boys Basketball State Runner-Up

Detroit International Academy

Detroit Martin Luther King
2022 Boys Football Division 3 State Champion
2021 Boys Football Division 3 State Champion
2018 Boys Football Division 3 State Champion
2016 Boys Football Division 2 State Champion
2015 Boys Football Division 2 State Champion
2007 Boys Football Division 2 State Champion
2006 Girls Basketball Class A State Champion
2005 Girls Basketball Class A State Runner-Up
2004 Girls Basketball Class A State Runner-Up
2003 Girls Basketball Class A State Champion
2000 Girls Basketball Class A State Runner-Up
1994 Girls Track Class A State Runner_up
1994 Girls Basketball Class A State Runner-Up
1993 Girls Basketball Class A State Runner-Up
1991 Girls Basketball Class A State Champion
1990 Girls Basketball Class A State Champion
1986 Girls Basketball Class A State Runner_up
1985 Girls Basketball Class A State Champion

Detroit Mumford
2005 Boys Track Division 1 State Runner-Up
2004 Boys Track Division 1 State Champion
2003 Boys Track Division 1 State Champion
2002 Boys Track Division 1 State Champion
1999 Boys Track Class A State Champion
1993 Boys Track Class A State Runner-Up
2007 Girls Track Track Division 1 State Runner-Up
2005 Girls Track Track Division 1 State Champion
2004 Girls Track Division 1 State Champion
1979 Girls Track Class A State Runner_up

Detroit Osborn

Detroit Pershing
2009 Boys Basketball Class A State Champion
2008 Boys Basketball Class A State Runner-Up
2000 Boys Basketball Class A State Runner-Up
1995 Boys Basketball Class A State Runner-Up
1994 Boys Basketball Class A State Runner-Up
1993 Boys Basketball Class A State Champion
1992 Boys Basketball Class A State Champion
1970 Boys Basketball Class A State Runner-Up
1967 Boys Basketball Class A State Runner-Up
1976 Girls Track Class A State Runner_up

Detroit Renaissance
2000 Boys Track Division 2 State Runner-Up
2011 Girls Basketball Class A State Runner-Up
2010 Girls Basketball Class A State Runner-Up
2007 Girls Track Division 2 State Champion
2006 Girls Track Division 2 State Champion
2005 Girls Track Division 2 State Champion
2004 Girls Track Division 2 State Runner_Up
2003 Girls Track Division 2 State Champion
2002 Girls Track Division 2 State Champion
2001 Girls Track Division 2 State Champion
2000 Girls Track Division 2 State Champion
1999 Girls Track Class A State Champion
1998 Girls Track Class A State Champion
1997 Girls Track Class A State Champion

Detroit Southeastern
2013 Boys Basketball Class A State Runner-Up
2011 Boys Basketball Class A State Runner-Up
1926 Boys Basketball Class A State Champion
1925 Boys Basketball Class A State Champion

Detroit West Side Academy

Detroit Western International
2015 Boys Basketball Class A State Champion
