= List of closed public schools in Detroit =

This is a list of schools closed by the Detroit Public Schools Community District. There have been about 200 school closures since 2000. Some have been repurposed or torn down, but most remain vacant. The exact number that sits empty is unclear. According to Detroiturbex.com, as of 2026 there are 36 empty, abandoned sites and 44 that have been demolished.

== High schools ==
School	Year closed
Chadsey High School	2009 (Note: Demolished in March 2011)
Thomas M. Cooley High School	2010
Crockett High School	2012 (Note: Students relocated to East English Village Preparatory Academy built on the former site of Finney High School.)
Crosman Alternative High School	2012
Detroit City Alternative High School	2012 (Note: This School was originally Longefellow Middle School.)
Jared W. Finney High School	2011 (Note: Was an Elementary School when it opened in 1928, then became a High School in 1961. Demolished in 2011 to Make way for East English Village Preparatory Academy)
Charles Kettering High School	2012
Mackenzie High School	2007 (Note: Demolished in 2012.)
Murray-Wright High School	2007 (Note: Now serves as Douglass Academy for Young Men.)
Northern High School	2008 (Note: Became Detroit International Academy for Young Women in 2005.)
Northeastern High School	1982
Redford High School	2007
Southwestern High School	2012
Trombly Alternative High School	2002

== Middle schools ==
School	Year closed
Helen Newberry Joy Middle School	2008
Barbour Magnet Middle School	2009
Butzel Elementary Middle	2010
Cadillac Middle School	2007
Elizabeth Cleveland Intermediate School	2006
Cerveny Middle School	2010
Condon Junior High School	1989
Farwell Middle School	2012
Foch Middle School	2004
Greusel Junior High School	2007
Guest Middle School	2010
Hally Magnet Middle School	2012
OW Holmes Elementary/Middle School	2013
Hutchins Intermediate School	2012
Jackson Intermediate School	2009
William S. Knudsen Junior High School	2015
Longfellow Middle School	2008
Lyster Junior High School	2012
Mettetal Junior High School	1987
Pelham Middle School	2007
Post Middle School	2007
Robinson Middle School	2012
Roosevelt Middle School	2001
Ruddiman Middle School	2008
Taft Middle School	2012
Ann Arbor Trail Magnet School	2026
Catherine C. Blackwell Institute	2026
Greenfield Elementary-Middle School	2026
J.E. Clark Preparatory Academy	2026
Fredrick Douglass Academy (Note: Opened in 1962 as Knudsen Jr. High School, later renamed)	2007

== Elementary schools ==
- Jane Adams Elementary School
- Alger Elementary School
- Amos Elementary School Closed in 1999
- Angell Elementary School - Closed in 2004.
- Maya Angelou Elementary School - Closed in 2008.
- Arthur Elementary School - Closed in 2016.
- Edmund Atkikson Elementary School - Closed in 2007.
- Barstow Elementary School - Lafayette Central Park.
- Barton Elementary School
- Beard Elementary School - Closed in 2014.
- Alexander Graham Bell Elementary School
- Bellefontaine Elementary School
- Bellevue Elementary School - Closed in 2005.
- Berry Elementary School - Closed in 2007.
- Bethune Academy - Closed in 2010.
- Biddle Elementary School - Closed in 2005.
- Alice Birney Elementary School - Closed in 2009.
- Birdhurst Elementary School
- Birney Elementary School - Closed in 2009.
- Boynton Elementary/Middle School - Closed in 2010
- Brewer Elementary - Closed in 2010. Was formerly Guardian Angels Catholic Church and School of Detroit
- Brady Elementary School - Closed in 2007. Will reopen as a charter High School.
- Breitmeyer Elementary School - Closed in 2006.
- Burbank Elementary School - Closed in 2006.
- Burgess Elementary School
- Burt Elementary School - Closed in 2010.
- Campau Elementary School
- Campbell Elementary School - Closed in 2012.
- Capron Elementary School
- Carlyle F. Stewart Elementary School - Closed in 2008, relocated to McCullough Elementary. Demolished in 2012.
- Cary Elementary School Closed in 2008
- Chandler Elementary School - Closed in 2004. (Note: Built in 1905, was named for former mayor Zachariah Chandler)
- Chaney Elementary School
- Clinton Elementary School - Closed in 2010.
- Clippert Elementary School
- Wilford L. Coffey Elementary/Middle School - Closed in 2009. (Note: Opened in 1925 and named for former Detroit City College dean Wilford Larn Coffey.)
- Columbian Elementary School
- Coolidge Elementary School - Closed in 2010.
- Jane Cooper Elementary School - Closed in 2009
- Courtis Elementary School
- Courville Elementary School - Closed in 2007.
- Craft Elementary School
- Crary Elementary School - Closed in 2012.
- Custer Elementary School
- Henry Doty Elementary School
- Detroit Open School - Closed in 2010
- Dixon Elementary/Middle School - Closed in 2010
- Doty Elementary School
- Dow Elementary School - Closed in 2005
- Duffield Elementary/Middle School (Note: Renamed Bunche in 2013 after moving to this site.)
- Huber Dwyer Elementary School
- Edgewood Elementary School
- Ellis Elementary School (Note: Hope of Detroit Academy Middle/High School was built after this school was demolished.)
- Estabrook Elementary School (Note: Detroit Police Training Academy built on this site.)
- Fairbanks Elementary School - Closed in 2008.
- Farrand Elementary School
- Ferry Elementary School- Closed in 2006.
- Fleming Elementary School- Closed in 2012.
- Flitzgerald Elementary School- Closed in 2012.
- George Ford Elementary School- Closed in 2005.
- Foster Elementary 2005 (Note: Various blogs report that the infamous Detroit Police Department Crime Lab operated inside the former Stephen Foster School (built in 1957) after it closed)
- Fox Elementary 2010
- Benjamin Franklin Elementary School – Closed in 2004.
- French Road Elementary School (Note: Was demolished in 1949 to make way for Arthur L. Fletcher Playfield.)
- Emma Fox Elementary School - Closed in 2006
- Garfield Elementary School
- George Elementary School
- Gershom Elementary School
- Gillies Elementary School
- Glazer Elementary School - Closed in 2016 (Note: Became New Paradigm Glazer-Loving Academy.)
- Goldberg Elementary School
- Gompers Elementary 2011
- Goodale Elementary School (Note: Facility replaced by Edward 'Duke' Ellington Conservatory of Music & Art @ Beckham Academy in 2003.)
- Grant Elementary/Middle School - Closed in 2007.
- Graying Elementary School - Closed in 2005.
- Greenfield Park Elementary School - Closed in 2007.
- Guyton Elementary School 2009 (Note: This school was designed in the English Tudor style and the kindergarten room includes a fireplace.)
- Hamilton Elementary/Middle School - Closed in 2016.
- Hancock Elementary School - Closed in 2012.
- Hanneman Elementary School - Closed in 2007. (Note: Charles Hanneman School was built in 1916; the gym and cafeteria were located in the basement, which is odd for a modern school but typical for construction in that era.)
- Hanstein Elementary School - Closed in 2010.
- Harding Elementary School - Closed in 2012 (Note: School was replaced by Gompers Elementary/Middle School.)
- Harris Elementary School - Closed in 2005.
- Herman Elementary School
- Higginbotham Elementary School - Closed in 1984.
- Higgins Elementary School - Closed in 2007.
- Hillger Elementary School
- Hosmer Elementary School - Closed in 2005.
- Holcomb Elementary School - Closed in 2010. (Note: This single-story brick building constructed in 1925 has two interior courtyards.)
- Houghton Elementary School - Closed in 2009
- Hubbard Elementary School
- Hubert Elementary School - Closed in 2005.
- Hunter Elementary School
- Irving Elementary School
- Ives Elementary School
- Jamieson Elementary School - Closed in 2010.
- Jeffries Elementary School
- Mae C. Jemison Academy
- Joffe Elementary School
- Jones Elementary/Middle School - Closed in 2005.
- Joyce Elementary School - Closed in 2009.
- Barbara Jordan Elementary School
- Keating Elementary School
- Kennedy Elementary School
- Kosciusko Elementary School - Closed in 2007. (Note: Built in 1955 and named for Tadeusz Kościuszko, a Polish General who fought alongside George Washington.) Will reopens as a charter Middle School
- Krolick Elementary School
- Larned Elementary School - Closed in 2009, (Note: Now used as House of Help Community School.)
- Nellie Leland Elementary School - Closed in 1981
- Liebold-Leonard Elementary School
- Lillibridge Elementary School - Closed in 2007.
- Lincoln Elementary School
- Lingemann Elementary School
- Lodge Elementary School- Closed in 2009.
- Logan Elementary School - Closed in 2013.
- Longfellow Elementary School - Opened 1916, due to low enrollment it became Detroit City Alternative High School in 2006. Closed in 2012 for similar reasons.
- John Lynch Elementary School. Opened 1914, Closed 2005.
- Alexander Macomb Elementary School - Closed in 2009. (Note: Named after Alexander Macomb, a Detroit native who served in the War of 1812 and later as Commanding General of the United States Army)
- Joseph F. Majeske Elementary School
- Marcy Elementary School
- Marsh Elementary School - Closed in 2005.
- Marshausen Elementary School
- Marxhausen Elementary School
- Mason Elementary School - Closed in 2012.
- Maybee Elementary School
- McColl Elementary School - Closed in 2012.
- McFarlane Elementary School - Closed in 2010.
- McGraw Elementary School
- McGregor Ekementary School - Closed in 2007.
- McKenny Elementary School - Closed in 2012.
- McKerrow Elementary School (Note: In 2004, the school converted to John Deiter School, then renamed Detroit Transition Center West, Closed in 2011.)
- McKinley Elementary School
- McKinstry Elementary School (Note: Became Clippert Multicultural Magnet Honors Academy.)
- McLean Elementary School (Note: Site taken over by Westside Christian Academy.)
- McMillan Elementary School - Closed in 1960.
- Monnier Elementary School - Closed in 2007.
- Monteith Elementary School - Closed in 1980.
- Moore Elementary School
- Morley Elementary School
- Newberry Elementary School - Closed in 2006 (Note: In 2014 Southwest Detroit Community School opened in a new building on this site. That school closed in 2019.)
- Newton Elementary School
- Norvell Elementary School
- Oakman Elementary/Orthopedic School - Closed in 2014.
  - The school, serving grades PreK-5, was established and specially designed to accommodate children with physical disabilities, but it also enrolled children with no disabilities. DPS announced that the school was to close in 2013 in order to solve the district's budget gap. Parents protested unsuccessfully to have the decision reversed. In 2013 it had about 300 students, with 40% of them having disabilities.
- Owen Academy - Closed in 2012.
- Palmer Elementary School
- George E. Parker Elementary School - Closed in 2012.
- Parkman Elementary School - Closed in 2005.
- Pattengill Elementary School
- Pestalouzzi Elementary School
- Phoenix Elementary/Middle School - Closed in 2016.
- Pierce Elementary School
- Pingree Elementary School
- Pitcher Elementary School - Closed in 2007.
- Edgar Allan Poe Elementary School - Closed in 2016.
- Potter Elementary School
- Pretson Elementary School
- Ravenswood Elementary School
- Richard Elementary School- Closed in 2017.
- William Robinson Elementary/Middle School - Closed in 2012.
- M. M. Rose Elementary School - Closed in 2007 (Note: This is the oldest standing school in Detroit, dating back to 1897.)
- Carl T. Rowan Community Elementary School
- Russell Elementary School
- Ruthruff Elementary School - Closed in 2006 (Note: In the 1980s and 1990s the school was known as the Ruthruff Adult Education. In the late 1990s or early 2000s, the school became the new home of the Malcolm X Academy program, an African-centric school.)
- Sanders Elementary School - Closed in 2006
- Scripps Elementary School - Closed in 2004.
- Sherrard Elementary School - Closed in 2008.
- Sherrill Elementary School - Closed in 2005
- Aisha Shule/web Dubois Prep Academy School - Closed in 2016.
- Sill Elementary School
- Smith Elementary School
- Stephens Elementary School - Closed in 2009
- Von Steuben Elementary School - Closed in 2005.
- Stratford Elementary School
- Szczenia Elementary School
- Tappan Elementary School (Corktown)
- Emma Thomas Elementary School. Opened 1905, closed in 1970's (Note: Destroyed by fire twice in 2009 & 2012, Demolished in 2013.)
- Tilden Elementary School - Destroyed by fire.
- Trowbridge Elementary School
- Van Dyke Elementary School (Note: Building Replaced by Butzel Junior High School which is now known as Garvey Academy.)
- Van Zile Elementary School - Closed in 2012.
- Vandenburg Elementary School (Note: Building converted to the Jalen Rose Leadership Academy, a charter school.)
- Vetal Elementary School - will reopen as a kindergarten program.
- Washington Elementary School - Closed in 2008 (Note: This was the Largest Elementary School in Detroit with a population of 2,240 students when it opened.)
- Weatherby Elementary School- Closed in 2005.
- Webster Elementary School - Closed in 2011.
- Wilkins Elementary School - Closed in 2013.
- Williams Elementary School
- Wilson Elementary School
- Wingert Elementary School
- Winship Elementary School (Note: Building later became University Yes Academy)
- Winterhalter Elementary School - Closed in 2010.
- Yost Elementary School - Closed in 2006.
- Gee Edmonson Academy - Closed in 2019.
- Peter Vetal Elementary School - Closed in 2011.

== Additional Information of schools ==
In 2025, the Paul Robeson Malcolm X Academy located at 2585 Grove St on the city's Northwest side was demolished. Formerly the P.J.M. Hally School, it was designed by Carey & Esselstyn and built by Talbot & Meier in 1928. It was still in use as a school until shortly before its demolition.

In 2019, Charles Kettering High School was subject to demolition by the new owner of the site Dakkota Integrated Systems, but after it was determined demo would push construction too far back they scaled down plans to only build on the athletic field site.

In 2012, Elizabeth Cleveland Intermediate School (closed 2009) was renovated as Frontier International Academy charter school.

History of Demolitions
School	Year Demolished
Mackenzie High School	2012
Northeastern High School	1982
Redford High School	2012
Tappan Intermediate	2001
Detroit City Alternative High School	2016
Chadsey High School	2011
Southwestern High School	2023
Wilson Intermediate/Phoenix Academy	2024
Beard Elementary School	2022
Cass Technical High School	2011
Mackenzie High School	2013
Redford High School	2012
Southwestern High School	2023
Robeson / Malcolm X Academy	2012
George Ferris School	2022
Highland Park Adult Education	2013
Ruthruff School	2024
Thomas Houghten Elementary	2016
Gompers Elementary School	2019
Hanneman Elementary School	2024
Sherrard Elementary School	2010
Breitmeyer Intermediate School	2010
Brewer Elementary School	2013
Samuel Dixon Elementary	2017
Dexter Ferry Elementary	2010
Greenfield Park Elementary School	2016
Grayling Elementary School	2013
Oliver Wendell Holmes School	2013
Jane Cooper Elementary School	2010
Joy Middle School	2009
Lynch Elementary School	2024
Lillibridge Elementary School	2015 (Note: All but the auditorium and gymnasium were demolished in the 1970's, which were then used by the Mckinney Day Treatment program for a short time. The rest of the site was demolished in 2015.)
Midland Elementary School	2012
John S. Newberry School	2010
Wilbur Wright School	2010
Fredrick Douglass Academy	2015
Emma Thomas School	2013
Birney Elementary School	2016
Rose School	2010
Marsh Elementary School	2015
Frederick W. Higgins Elementary	2014
Longfellow School / Detroit City Alt High	2016
Woodward Elementary School	2010
James McMillan School	2008

== See also ==
- List of Detroit Public Schools schools
