= John Macurdy =

American opera singer (1929–2020)

- Born: March 18, 1929; Detroit, Michigan, US
- Died: May 7, 2020 (aged 91); Stamford, Connecticut, US
- Occupation: Opera singer
- Years active: 1952–2000
- Employer: New York Metropolitan Opera
- Spouse: Justine Votipka
- Children: 2

John Macurdy (né John Edward McCurdy; March 18, 1929 – May 7, 2020) was an American operatic bass, who sang at the Metropolitan Opera 1,001 times from 1962 to 2000 (and also sang numerous performances in other opera houses). Among his teachers was the contralto Elisabeth Wood of New Orleans, who was also the pedagogue of Norman Treigle.

== Early life ==
Macurdy was born on March 18, 1929, in Detroit, Michigan. He was of Scottish descent by way of Nova Scotia. As a three-year-old a neighbor paid him 10 cents to sing "O Tannenbaum". Growing up, he sung in the Grosse Pointe Memorial Church choir, singing as a soprano until his voice changed at age 12. Marie Curtis, the church choir director, encouraged him to take singing lessons. At age 16, she sent him to Avery Crew, a top voice teacher in Detroit, who became his mentor for many years.

Macurdy attended Keating Elementary and Hutchinson Intermediary schools, and graduated from Cass Technical High School, all in Detroit. He attended the Wayne State University College of Engineering from 1947 to 1949, then entered an apprenticeship program for wood pattern-die model makers provided by the styling section of General Motors.

He put his apprenticeship on hold to serve in the U.S. Air Force for four years during the Korean War at Keesler Air Force Base in Biloxi, Mississippi, rising to the rank of Sergeant as a radar-electronics instructor. During this time, he also sang with the New Orleans Opera House Association and the Mobile Opera Guild.

After leaving the Air Force, he returned to Detroit to complete his apprenticeship at General Motors. Now a journeyman model maker, he worked for Creative Industries of Detroit as a die and patternmaker. He also continued to pursue singing, attending Boris Goldovsky's summer opera workshops at Oglebay Park (in West Virginia), Pittsburgh, and Tanglewood. In 1957, Macurdy left Detroit for New York City to pursue his singing career.

== Opera career ==
=== Début in New Orleans ===
Macurdy made his formal debut with the New Orleans Opera Association on the opening night of the 1952–53 season, as the Old Hebrew in Samson et Dalila, with Ramón Vinay and Blanche Thebom in the cast, which was conducted by Walter Herbert and staged by Wilhelm von Wymetal. He went on to appear with that company until 1959, in Thaïs, Die Entführung aus dem Serail (conducted by Julius Rudel), The Consul and Norma. He was to return to New Orleans for Sarastro in Die Zauberflöte, in 1979. During those years, he also occasionally performed with other companies, notably portraying Mr Earnshaw in the world premiere of Carlisle Floyd's Wuthering Heights, at the Santa Fe Opera in 1958.

=== New York City Opera ===
In 1959, Macurdy made his New York City Opera debut, as Dr Wilson in Street Scene. Among his other roles there, until 1962, were Jabez Stone in The Devil and Daniel Webster, the Basso Cantante in Six Characters in Search of an Author (world premiere, with Beverly Sills), William Jennings Bryan in The Ballad of Baby Doe, Mr Earnshaw in Wuthering Heights (opposite Phyllis Curtin and Patricia Neway), Créon in Œdipus rex (conducted by Leopold Stokowski), Colline in La bohème, Timur in Turandot, President Prexy in The Cradle Will Rock, a Priest in Il prigioniero (with Treigle), Sparafucile in Rigoletto, Don Alfonso in Così fan tutte, the King of Egypt (later Ramfis) in Aïda, Reb Bashevi in Abraham Ellstein's The Golem (world premiere), and the Reverend John Hale in The Crucible (with Chester Ludgin). He made a return to that ensemble in 1979, for a single performance of Raimondo Bidebent in Lucia di Lammermoor.

=== Metropolitan Opera ===
It was the Metropolitan Opera that would become Macurdy's artistic home. Debuting as Tom in Un ballo in maschera in 1962, from there (until 1997), Macurdy would sing more than 1,000 performances, in a great variety of roles, including the King (later Ramfis) in Aïda, Alessio (later Count Rodolfo) in La sonnambula (opposite Dame Joan Sutherland), Don Basilio in Il barbiere di Siviglia, the Commendatore in Don Giovanni (perhaps his most acclaimed role), Ferrando in Il trovatore, Prince Gremin in Eugene Onegin, Colline, Count des Grieux in Manon, Daland in Der fliegende Holländer, Sparafucile, Agrippa in Antony and Cleopatra (world premiere), King Heinrich in Lohengrin (in Wieland Wagner's posthumous production), Sarastro, Ezra Mannon in Mourning Becomes Electra (world premiere), Alvise Badoero in La Gioconda, Hunding in Die Walküre (with Jon Vickers), Count Walter in Luisa Miller (with Montserrat Caballé), Timur, Raimondo (to Renata Scotto's Lucia), the Grand Inquisitor in Don Carlos (with Franco Corelli), Titurel (later Gurnemanz) in Parsifal, King Marke in Tristan und Isolde, Rocco in Fidelio (with Anja Silja in her Met debut), Méphistophélès in Faust, Pimen in Boris Godunov, Oroveso in Norma, and Tirésias in Œdipus rex (in John Dexter's production). In the year 2000, he returned to the Met, for Hagen in Götterdämmerung, under James Levine.

=== Europe ===
Macurdy also appeared at the Paris Opéra (Arkel in Pelléas et Mélisande, 1973), Teatro alla Scala (Rocco in Fidelio, 1974; Hermann in Tannhäuser, with Dunja Vejzovic as Venus, 1984), Teatro Colón, and Salzburg Festival. In 1978, he portrayed the Commendatore in Joseph Losey's famous film of Don Giovanni, with Ruggero Raimondi, Edda Moser, Dame Kiri Te Kanawa, Kenneth Riegel, José van Dam, and Teresa Berganza, conducted by Lorin Maazel.

== Personal life ==
Macurdy's father worked for a tool and die company. He died while on a business trip to New Orleans when Macurdy was 19. His mother, Dorothea, was a secretary at Wayne State University for many years. He had two sisters.

Macurdy married Justine Votipka, also from Detroit. She studied piano at the University of Michigan, and was working as an accompanist-coach for a Goldovsky opera workshop in 1955 when they met. They married in 1958.

The couple eventually settled in the woods near Stamford, Connecticut, in a house Macurdy largely built himself. Justine was active with the League of Women Voters and the Schubert Club in Stamford, at one point serving as its president.

They had two children – Allison, born in 1959 or 1960, and John, born in 1964 or 1965. Allison graduated from the University of Boston. In 1985, she married Australian Nicholas Blaxland Hays.

== Death ==
Macurdy died of natural causes on May 7, 2020, in Stamford.

== Commercial discography ==
- Ward: The Crucible (Ludgin; Buckley, 1962) CRI
- Beethoven: Ninth Symphony (Ormandy, p. 1966) CBS/Sony
- Mozart: Die Zauberflöte (Raskin, Peters, Shirley, Uppman; Krips, 1967) [live] Metropolitan Opera
- Mozart: Don Giovanni (Milnes; Böhm, 1977) [live] Deutsche Grammophon
- Mozart: Don Giovanni (Raimondi; Maazel, 1978) CBS/Sony
- Berlioz: Béatrice et Bénédict (Cotrubaș, Minton, Domingo, Fischer-Dieskau; Barenboim, 1981) Deutsche Grammophon
- Verdi: Otello (Ricciarelli, Domingo, Díaz; Maazel, 1985) EMI

== Commercial videography ==
- Mozart: Don Giovanni (Raimondi; Maazel, Losey, 1978) Gaumont
- Wagner: Tannhäuser (Cassilly; Levine, Schenk/Berkowitz, 1982) [live] Pioneer Classics
- Wagner: Lohengrin (Hofmann; Levine, Everding, 1986) [live] Pioneer Classics
