= DDSD =

DDSD may refer to:

- David Douglas School District
- Detroit Day School for the Deaf
