= Atkinson Elementary School =

Atkinson Elementary School may refer to:

- Atkinson Elementary School (Louisville, Kentucky)
- Atkinson Elementary School (Portland, Oregon) in Portland, Oregon, formerly Atkinson Grammar School
- Edmund Atkinson School (Detroit)
- Atkinson Elementary School (Houston) - Pasadena Independent School District
