= Academy of the Americas =

School in Detroit, Michigan, U.S.

Coordinates: 42.327299°N 83.109804°W

Student assessments
- 2021–22 school year Change vs. prior year

M-STEP 11th grade proficiency rates (Science / Social Studies)
- Advanced %: ≤10 / ≤10
- Proficient %: – / ≤10
- PR. Proficient %: ≤10 / –
- Not Proficient %: – / –

Average test scores
- SAT Total: 782.0 (▼ −60.6)

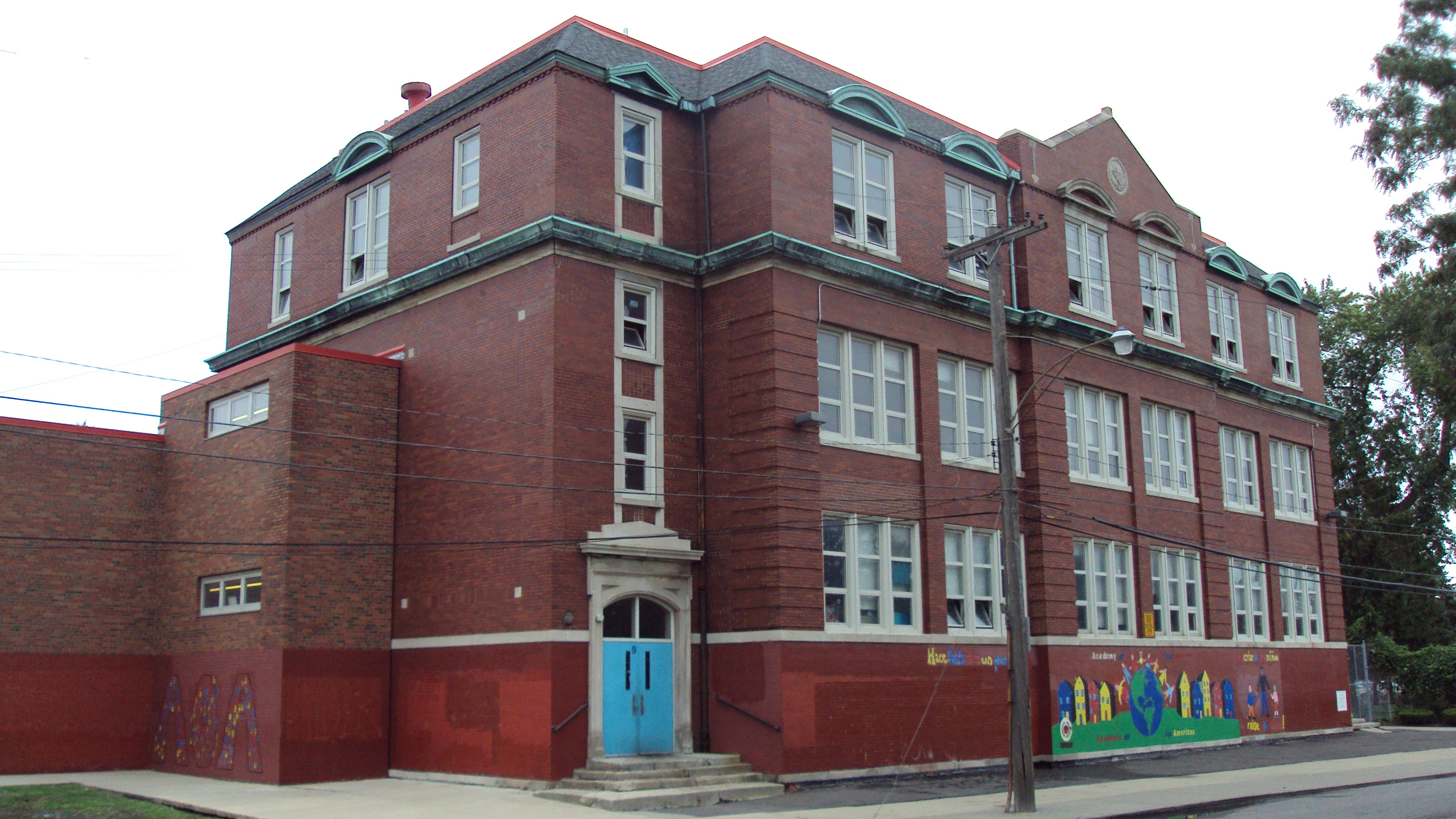

The Academy of the Americas (Spanish: Academia de las Américas) is a public pre-kindergarten through high school of Detroit Public Schools, with its primary school campus located in the former St. Hedwig School in southwest Detroit. It offers a Spanish-English bilingual program.

The high school, called Academy of the Americas High School (Spanish: Escuela Preparatoria Academia de las Américas), began in the 2014–2015 year with ninth grade students enrolled. As of 2014 it was one of two senior high school programs in southwest Detroit, along with Western International High School. The high school classes are located in Corktown, in a building next to the Ste. Anne de Detroit Catholic Church. This building opened on January 29, 2016.
