= Northeastern High School (Michigan) =

Coordinates: 42°21′58.2″N 83°02′16.8″W

- 4872 Grandy Street; Detroit, Michigan; United States

Information
- Type: Public secondary
- Status: Demolished
- Closed: 1982
- School district: Detroit Public Schools
- Grades: 9-12
- Language: English
- Area: Urban
- Colors: Green and Gold
- Nickname: Falcons

Northeastern High School was a public high school in Detroit, Michigan. It was a member of the Detroit Public Schools and was located on Grandy Street between Warren Avenue and Forest Avenue on the city's northeast side.

The school competed athletically in the Detroit Public School League and was a member of the Michigan High School Athletic Association. In 1975, the school won the MHSAA girls state basketball championship.

In early 1982, it was announced that Northeastern was one of 19 Detroit schools listed for closure. It closed later that year.

Among the notable alumni of Detroit Northeastern High were NBA player Charles Edge (class of 1968) and playwright Ron Milner (class of 1956), Berry Gordy, the music mogul, also attended Northeastern high but dropped out in order to be a pro boxer, Martha Reeves of Motown fame, Everett Kircher (class of 1935), founder of Boyne Resorts, and Mary Wilson of the Supremes.
