= Bart Scott =

American football player (born 1980)

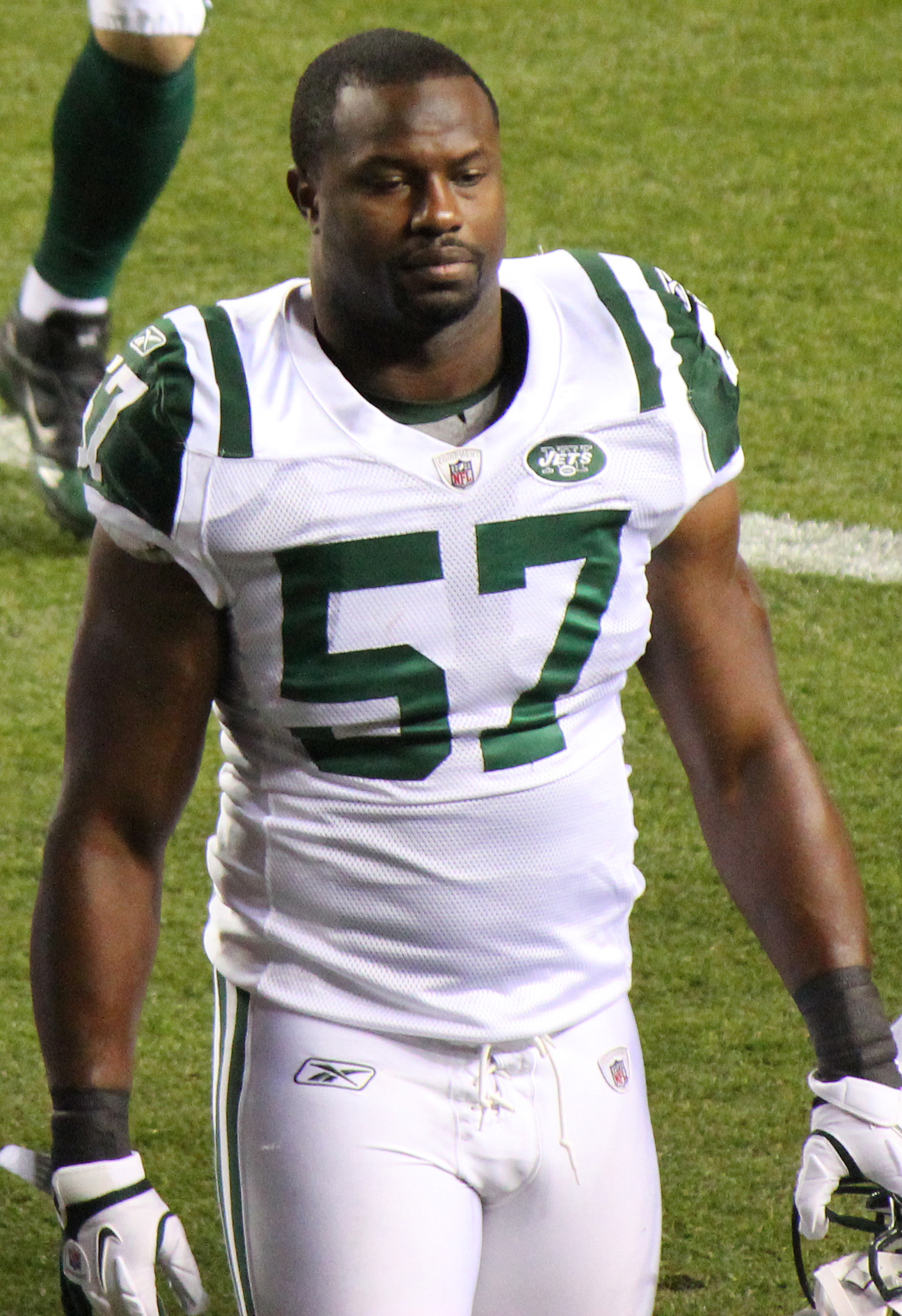
- Scott with the New York Jets in 2011

No. 57
- Position: Linebacker

Personal information
- Born: August 18, 1980 (age 46); Detroit, Michigan, U.S.
- Listed height: 6 ft 2 in (1.88 m)
- Listed weight: 242 lb (110 kg)

Career information
- High school: Southeastern (Detroit)
- College: Southern Illinois (1998–2001)
- NFL draft: 2002: undrafted

Career history
- Baltimore Ravens (2002–2008); New York Jets (2009–2012)

Awards and highlights
- Second-team All-Pro (2006); Pro Bowl (2006)

Career NFL statistics
- Total tackles: 747
- Sacks: 25.0
- Forced fumbles: 6
- Fumble recoveries: 7
- Interceptions: 4
- Stats at Pro Football Reference

Bartholomew Edward Scott (born August 18, 1980) is an American sports analyst and former professional football player. Scott was a linebacker in the National Football League (NFL) for eleven seasons. After playing college football for the Southern Illinois Salukis, he was signed by the NFL's Baltimore Ravens as an undrafted free agent in 2002. Scott was selected to the Pro Bowl in 2006. After playing his first seven years with the Ravens, Scott signed with the New York Jets in 2009. He would play his final four seasons for the Jets.

He was employed as an NFL analyst for CBS television from 2013 to 2017. Scott was recently employed as the co-host of Bart and Carlin weekdays 10 to 1 on ESPN Radio in New York City.

== Early life ==
Scott attended Southeastern High School in Detroit, coached by Drake Wilkins, where he played running back and linebacker on the football team. Scott's assistant coach, Reinard Davis, recalled that "[Scott] went 110 percent on every snap and never came off the field." During his senior year, Scott recorded 76 tackles and led the team in rushing with 635 yards.

More than one hundred colleges sent recruiting letters; however, low SAT scores made colleges wary of offering Scott a scholarship. Scott later improved his test scores to ensure eligibility. During July workouts for a Michigan high school all-star game, Scott was impressive on the field, catching the interest of coach Bryan Masi. Masi contacted Dan Enos, a friend and an assistant coach at Southern Illinois; the Southern Illinois staff decided to offer Scott a scholarship.

Scott continues to return to Southeastern High School nearly every year to speak with students. Additionally, Scott paid for new uniforms and equipment in 2005 and provided money to upgrade the weight room in 2007. Scott also paid to have a new set of bleachers installed at the school after vandals stole the school's former bleachers. In honor of Scott's accomplishments on and off the field, Southeastern retired his jersey in 2008.

== College career ==
At Southern Illinois University, Scott played linebacker and safety for the Southern Illinois Salukis football team. As a junior, Scott was suspended from the team for the final six games of the season following an altercation with defensive coordinator Michael Vite who chastised Scott for eating during a locker room meeting. At the end of the year, the team's entire coaching staff was fired; Jerry Kill was hired as the new head coach. Kill had been warned by a former staff members about Scott's behavior. However, Kill was impressed by Scott, calling him "a captain and leader." During his senior year, Scott led the team with 127 tackles and 5.5 sacks; earning first-team All-Gateway conference honors.

Kill touted Scott's abilities to several NFL teams but only the Baltimore Ravens sent out a scout to assess Scott. The scout was impressed by Scott and three days following the 2002 NFL draft, after going undrafted, Scott signed a contract with the Ravens.

Scott later returned to Southern Illinois in 2005 to finish his academic studies, graduating with a degree in economics. Scott later became a first-ballot member of the Southern Illinois Hall of Fame.

== Professional career ==
=== Baltimore Ravens ===
During Scott's first three years with Baltimore, he was a special teams standout. However, he saw little time in the defensive rotation. In his rookie season, he played in all 16 regular season games and recorded five tackles and one interception on defense while tying with another teammate to lead the team in special teams tackles at 17. He made his NFL debut at the Carolina Panthers on September 8, 2002. The following season, he again played in all 16 games and one post-season game, recording nine tackles and one fumble recovery on defense. His 19 special teams tackles, a career high, ranked second on the team. In the 2004 season, he played in 13 games, making 17 special teams tackles, adding five tackles on defense playing as a safety and linebacker.

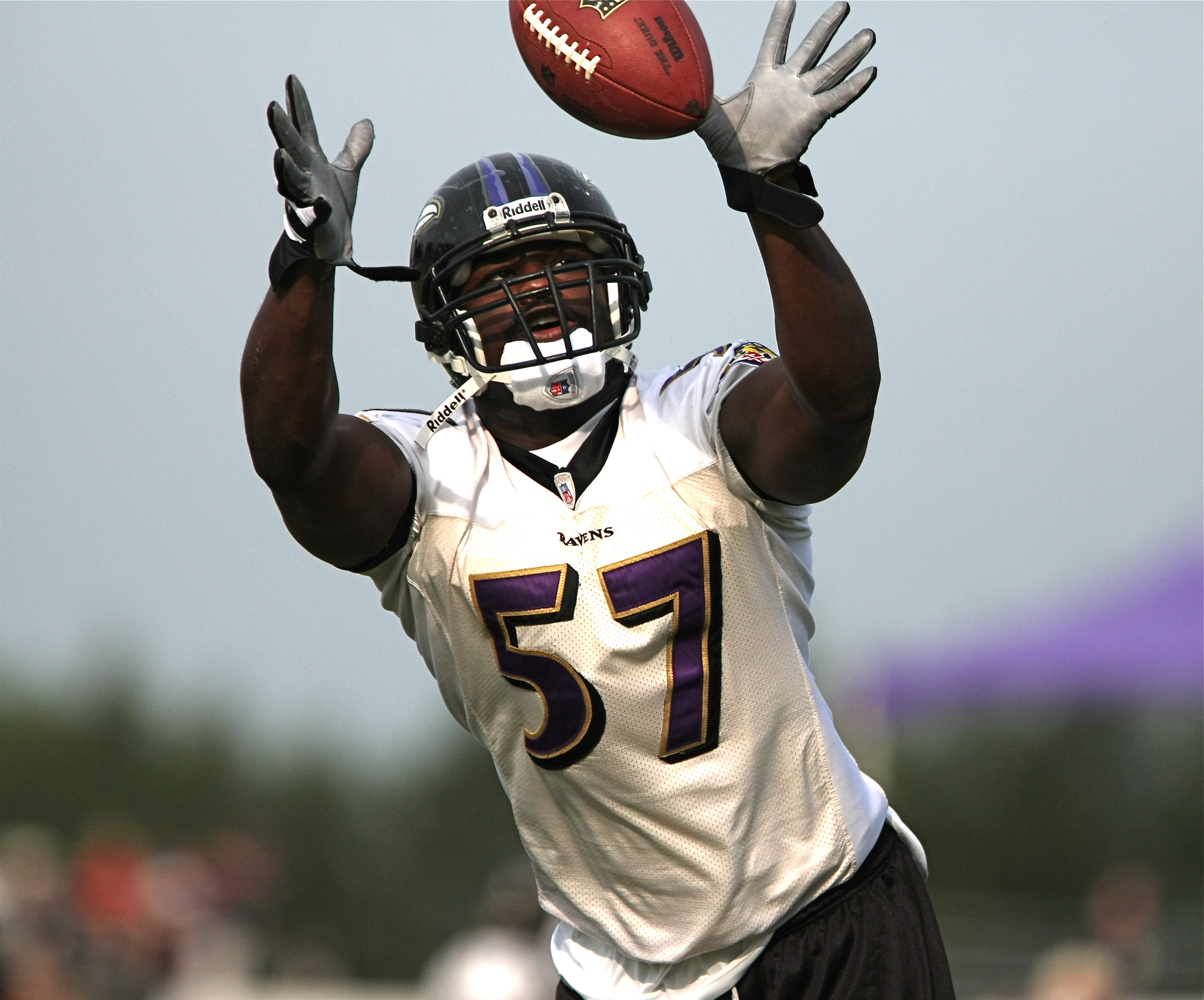
Scott as a member of the Baltimore Ravens

Scott saw significant playing time during the 2005 season as Ray Lewis suffered a hamstring injury, playing in all 16 games and making 10 starts. He finished the season with 119 tackles, four sacks, two forced fumbles, one fumble recovery and four passes defended. Scott signed a three-year, $13.5 million contract extension with the Ravens, turning down an offer from the Cleveland Browns. In 2006, Scott ended the season with a career-high 135 tackles, 9.5 sacks, two interceptions and nine passes defended. He played in the Pro Bowl in Hawaii as an alternate after being elected to replace his teammate Ray Lewis. Scott was named to the Associated Press' second All-Pro team.

Scott started all 16 games for the second straight season and recorded 131 tackles, one sack and three passes defended. On December 3, 2007, Scott was penalized twice for unsportsmanlike conduct in the fourth quarter of the Monday Night Football game against the New England Patriots. The second call came after Scott picked up the official's flag from the first call and threw it. Following the game, teammate Samari Rolle made accusations of disrespectful language by the official involved. In his final year with Baltimore, Scott again started all 16 games contributing with 104 tackles, 1.5 sacks and five passes defended.

=== New York Jets ===
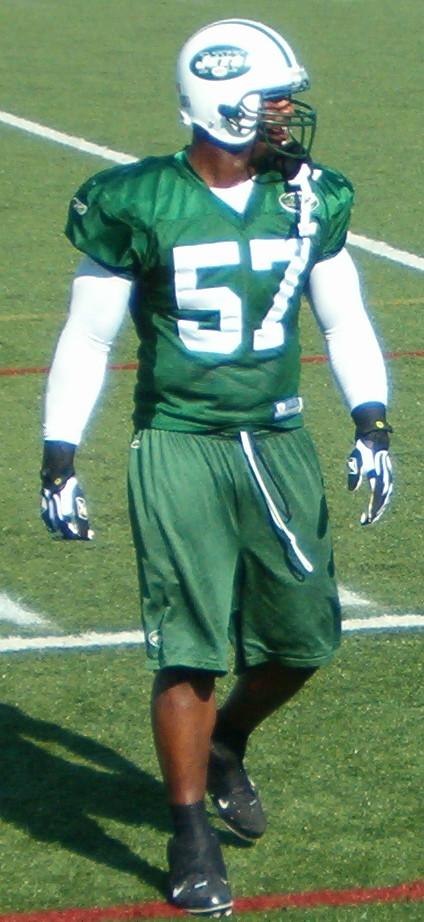
Scott during a 2009 Jets training camp session

In 2009, Scott became a free agent. Both the Ravens and New York Jets vied for Scott's services. After the Jets amended their contract offer by adding a year to the deal, Scott signed the six-year, $48 million contract with New York on February 27, 2009. This reunited him with head coach Rex Ryan, his former defensive coach in Baltimore, whom Scott has stated he would follow anywhere.

Scott started every game in his first season with New York, finishing the year with 92 tackles and a sack.

After the Jets defeated the New England Patriots in an AFC Divisional Playoff game on January 16, 2011, ESPN's Sal Paolantonio approached Scott for an interview. Scott interrupted Paolantonio with a rant supporting his team and antagonizing "non-believers", specifically calling out ESPN's Tom Jackson. A clip of the interview went viral after being posted on YouTube. Despite Scott's boasting, the Jets lost to the Pittsburgh Steelers in the AFC Championship the following week. On March 3, 2011, Scott made an appearance for professional wrestling promotion Total Nonstop Action Wrestling (TNA) on their TNA Impact! television show, appearing alongside Hulk Hogan and Ric Flair at a wedding ceremony between Jeff Jarrett and Karen Jarrett and in the end tapping out to Kurt Angle's ankle lock.

Scott's final two years with the Jets were marred by struggles and controversy on and off the field. On January 1, 2012, the day after the Jets missed the playoffs after losing their last three games, Scott was fined $10,000 for showing an obscene gesture in front of a cameraman while in the locker room. That September, Scott threatened to assault a photographer in the Jets' locker room. In November, Scott tried and failed to organize a media boycott; however, it lasted only a few moments. Later that month, Scott verbally attacked fans after the Jets gave up 35 second quarter points in a 49–19 blowout loss to New England. The Jets failed to make the playoffs in Scott's final two seasons with the team putting up a combined record of 14–18. According to Pro Football Focus, Scott ranked last among inside linebackers in tackling efficiency in 2012.

The Jets released Scott on February 19, 2013.

== NFL career statistics ==
Legend
| **Bold** | Career high |

| Year | Team | Games | | Tackles | | | | Fumbles | | | Interceptions | | | | | |
| Year | Team | G | GS | Comb | Total | Ast | Sacks | FF | FR | Yds | Int | Yds | Avg | Lng | TD | PD |
|---|---|---|---|---|---|---|---|---|---|---|---|---|---|---|---|---|
| 2002 | BAL | 16 | 0 | 20 | 16 | 4 | 0.0 | 0 | 0 | 0 | 1 | 0 | 0 | 0 | 0 | 1 |
| 2003 | BAL | 16 | 0 | 22 | 19 | 3 | 0.0 | 0 | 1 | 0 | 0 | 0 | 0 | 0 | 0 | 1 |
| 2004 | BAL | 13 | 0 | 21 | 13 | 8 | 0.0 | 0 | 0 | 0 | 0 | 0 | 0 | 0 | 0 | 0 |
| 2005 | BAL | 16 | 10 | 92 | 62 | 30 | 4.0 | **2** | **2** | 0 | 0 | 0 | 0 | 0 | 0 | 1 |
| 2006 | BAL | 16 | 16 | **103** | **78** | 25 | **9.5** | 0 | 0 | 0 | **2** | **31** | **16** | **24** | 0 | **9** |
| 2007 | BAL | 16 | 16 | 93 | 62 | **31** | 1.0 | 0 | 0 | 0 | 0 | 0 | 0 | 0 | 0 | 5 |
| 2008 | BAL | 16 | 16 | 82 | 61 | 21 | 1.5 | **2** | 0 | 0 | 0 | 0 | 0 | 0 | 0 | 5 |
| 2009 | NYJ | 16 | 16 | 92 | 67 | 25 | 1.0 | 0 | 0 | 0 | 0 | 0 | 0 | 0 | 0 | 1 |
| 2010 | NYJ | 16 | 16 | 81 | 59 | 22 | 1.0 | 1 | 1 | 0 | 0 | 0 | 0 | 0 | 0 | 2 |
| 2011 | NYJ | 16 | 15 | 66 | 54 | 12 | 4.5 | 1 | 1 | 9 | 0 | 0 | 0 | 0 | 0 | 1 |
| 2012 | NYJ | 15 | 13 | 60 | 36 | 24 | 2.5 | 0 | 1 | **38** | 1 | 11 | 11 | 11 | 0 | 1 |
| Career | | 172 | 118 | 732 | 527 | 205 | 25.0 | 6 | 6 | 0 | 4 | 42 | 11 | 24 | 0 | 27 |

== Broadcasting career ==
=== Television career ===
After drawing some interest from teams during the off-season, Scott retired and was hired by CBS Sports as an analyst for CBS Sports Network's That Other Pregame Show.

In February 2014, it was announced that Scott would join CBS' The NFL Today for the 2014 season. In 2017, it was announced that Scott was replaced by Nate Burleson.

In December 2021, Scott advocated for the Baltimore Ravens to injure Joe Burrow in future games after they lost to the Cincinnati Bengals 41–21. While speaking on ESPN's "Get Up", he said in reference to Burrow, "He's gonna get the rib shot. He's gonna get the neck shot. He's going to get the tackle the arms, bust his head off the ground shot" and also that the Ravens had put a "red dot" on him.

Scott was laid off from ESPN in July 2026 as part of a mass layoff.

=== Radio career ===
In November 2017, Scott was named as the replacement, along with Chris Carlin and Maggie Gray, for long-time WFAN host Mike Francesa during the afternoon drive. In January 2020, alongside Alan Hahn, Scott launched a local show for ESPN New York in the mid-day slot previously occupied by Stephen A. Smith.

== Personal life ==
"I wasn't supposed to make it out of Detroit. I wasn't supposed to get a scholarship. I was supposed to be [covering] kicks the rest of my life. But here I am. I'm a man playing with the house's money, and that's a dangerous man."
— Bart Scott

Scott grew up relatively poor in the violence-filled and drug-infested neighborhood of Hurlbut Street on the east side of Detroit. In spite of this, Scott received guidance from multiple sources including his parents, Dorita Adams and Bart Capers and other family members.

Scott has been very involved with the community; he is involved in multiple charities, including A Son Never Forgets, a foundation dedicated to helping those suffering with paralysis which was established by Scott himself in October 2006. Scott has also dedicated money to his former neighborhood, buying a plot of land to build a playground near his grandmother's home in addition to providing equipment and speaking with students at his alma mater, Southeastern High School.

Scott is married to Darnesha. They have three children, two sons and a daughter. Because of the concussion issue, Scott expressed at one time that he did not want his son to play football.
