= Detroit Day School for the Deaf =

Public school in Detroit, Michigan, US

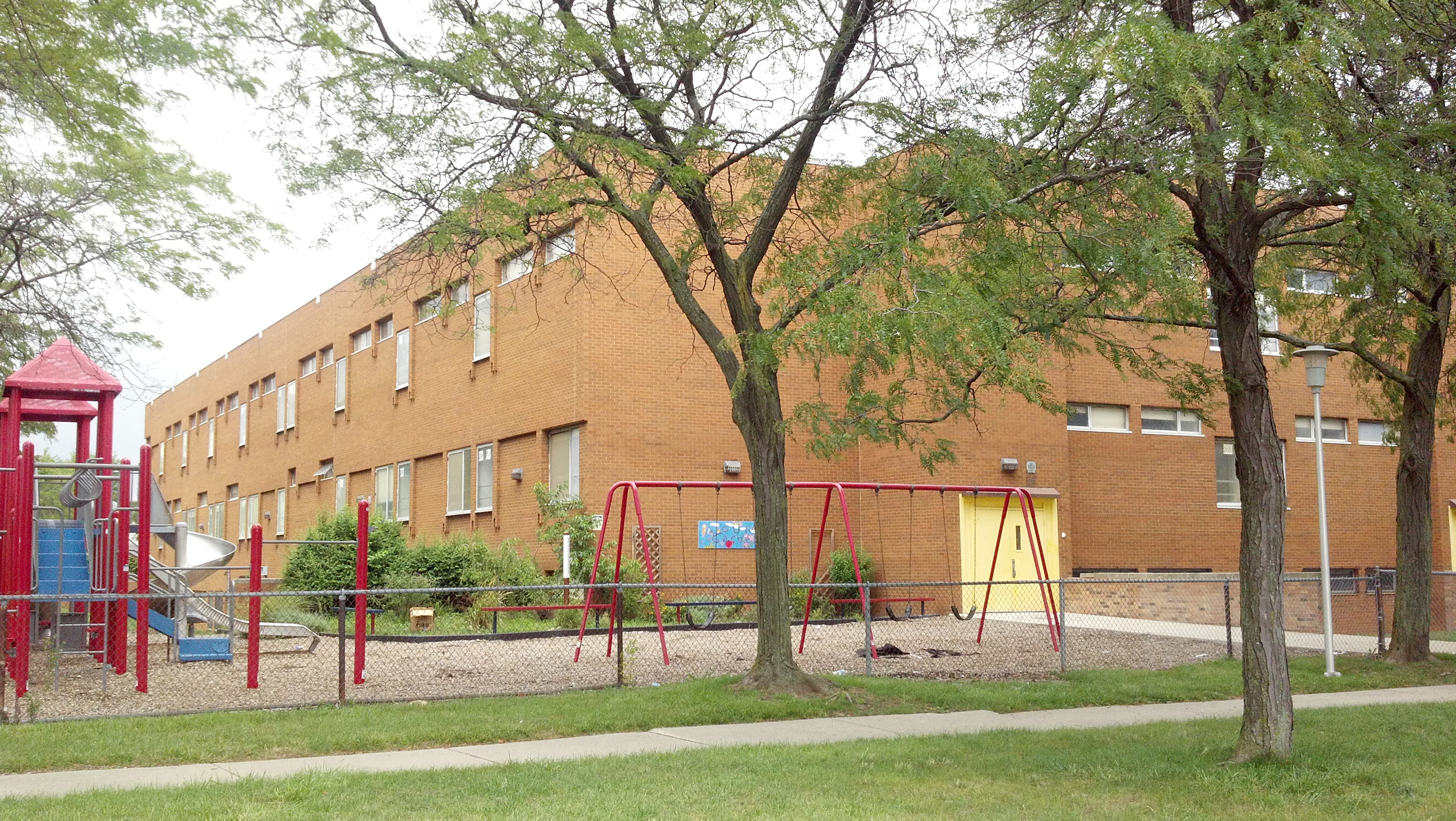

Location
- 4555 John C. Lodge Freeway; Detroit, Michigan 48201; 42°21′02″N 83°04′25″W

Information
- Type: Public school
- Founded: 1893
- Status: Closed
- Closed: July 2012
- School district: Detroit Public Schools
- Grades: PreK–8
- Enrollment: 36 (2011–12 school year)
- Website: DPS profile

Detroit Day School for the Deaf (DDSD) was a public school for deaf students in Detroit, Michigan, for grades Pre-Kindergarten through 8. It was a part of Detroit Public Schools.

At the school, the main mode of communication was American Sign Language. When it operated, the school had an early intervention program for children who were hard of hearing and deaf; the program served 300 children.

== History ==
The school was established in 1893. At the time, the common practice in American education was to send deaf children to boarding schools; Detroit Day School was intended to serve as a day school so that deaf students could live in their houses while attending school. The school was organized around 1900. In 1905 the school had seven teachers and 45 students. That year the Detroit Free Press stated that the presence of the school was saving the state of Michigan $15,000 each year. Around that period state Senator Jenks was proposing a bill that would have hindered the school. Elizabeth Van Adestine, the principal, said that she did not believe that Jenks's bill would pass.

The final school building opened in 1970. In 2008 the school considered adding a high school component in order to make itself viable. In 2010 parents started a letter writing campaign, contacted politicians, and organized rallies to prevent the school's closure.

=== Closure ===
In 2009 the State of Michigan took control of the school district. Attempts to close the school began after the takeover. The district had considered closing the school in 2010, but Robert Bobb, the Emergency Financial Manager, cancelled the closing. Bobb had also considered closing the school in 2010 and on one other occasion. Parents of students at DDSD said that they persuaded him to keep the school open both times.

The school ultimately was scheduled to close in June 2012. By its final year the school had 36 students. Steven Wasko, the DPS chief communications officer, said that the building was too large for the program, the majority of parents of deaf children prefer that their children be introduced to a hearing environment early, there were too few children at the school, and that the other facilities for deaf at other DPS schools are compliant with the Americans with Disabilities Act. The DPS administration planned to "mainstream" the former students by placing them in regular schools. At the time, the district had 102 deaf students in regular schools. John Carlisle (DetroitBlogger John) of the Metro Times said that some parents were opposed to the closure because their children liked the social environment and feared that they would not be socially accepted at other schools. In September 2012 former students and parents of former students appeared at the school building to protest the closure.

== Facility ==
The final school building, located near Midtown, opened in 1970, replacing the previous school building located at 6045 Stanton Street. It was designed specifically for deaf students, and as of 2012 is compliant with the Americans with Disabilities Act. It is located on the southbound John C. Lodge Freeway service drive at Forest. The school building has over 50 classrooms. As of 2012 DPS uses the school building as office space.
