= The Rise and Fall of an Urban School System =

Book by Jeffrey Mirel

- Author: Jeffrey Mirel
- Publisher: University of Michigan Press
- Publication date: 1993

The Rise and Fall of an Urban School System: Detroit, 1907-1981 is a 1993 nonfiction book by Jeffrey Mirel, published by the University of Michigan Press. It discusses the rise and decline of Detroit Public Schools (DPS) in the 20th century, with the book's discussion focusing on the 1920s, the zenith of DPS, through the 1980s. Mirel argued that the Great Depression, various trends related to racial tensions stemming from the Civil Rights Movement, the development of new suburbia, and other factors were primarily responsible for the decline of DPS; the conflicts between blacks and whites and between labor and management eroded the consensus reached during the Progressive Era that schools should receive ample financing. They were forces that a school superintendent or a school board would not be able to overcome.

In 1999 the book's second edition was published.

== Background ==
As part of his research Mirel used board of education proceedings, papers written by persons involved in the educational politics, and Detroit-area major newspapers.

== Content ==
The book's primary content involved politics related to school financing, including expenditures and taxation, with less emphasis going to changes in curriculum. Mirel argued that the social classes and races need to come together and cooperate so that the Detroit school system can be properly funded and maintain its academic standards; the author makes this view known in the epilogue. The second edition has a new epilogue that covers the late 1980s and the 1990s.

Arthur Zilversmit of Lake Forest College wrote that how Mirel relates national trends in desegregation relate to the local issues are a "real strength" of the book.

Jon C. Teaford of Purdue University wrote that the book's author "allocates blame and praise with a fairly even hand and appears unwilling to bend his data to conform to a preconceived end." Teaford stated that the lack of jargon and how it was "clearly written" were beneficial for the book.

== Reception ==
For creating this book, Mirel won the 1994-95 "Outstanding Book Award" from Stanford University and the American Educational Research Association, and he also won the 1994 "Critics' Choice Award" from the American Educational Studies Association.

Zilversmit stated that the book is an "admirably balanced and comprehensive history".

Daniel Perlstein of the University of California at Berkeley wrote that the book "thus demonstrates how historical scholarship on the decline of urban school systems can illuminate the relationship of critical educational issues to the broader political questions troubling America."

Harvey Kantor of the University of Utah argued that Mirel was correct in saying that divisions and race in class contributed to the downfall of the schools, but that Kantor argued that the necessity to restructure the education system to accommodate black stakeholders was the true underlying reason, and not due to any declining standards of education.

Teaford concluded that the book is "a superb account of the Detroit schools, and his study is a model for other scholars." Teaford argued that Mirel should have covered the period after 1981 (he had reviewed the first edition), included opinions and viewpoints from students, and included more "critical scrutiny" on school administrators and teachers.

== See also ==
- Educational inequality in Southeast Michigan
