= Elizabeth Cleveland Intermediate School =

- U.S. National Register of Historic Places
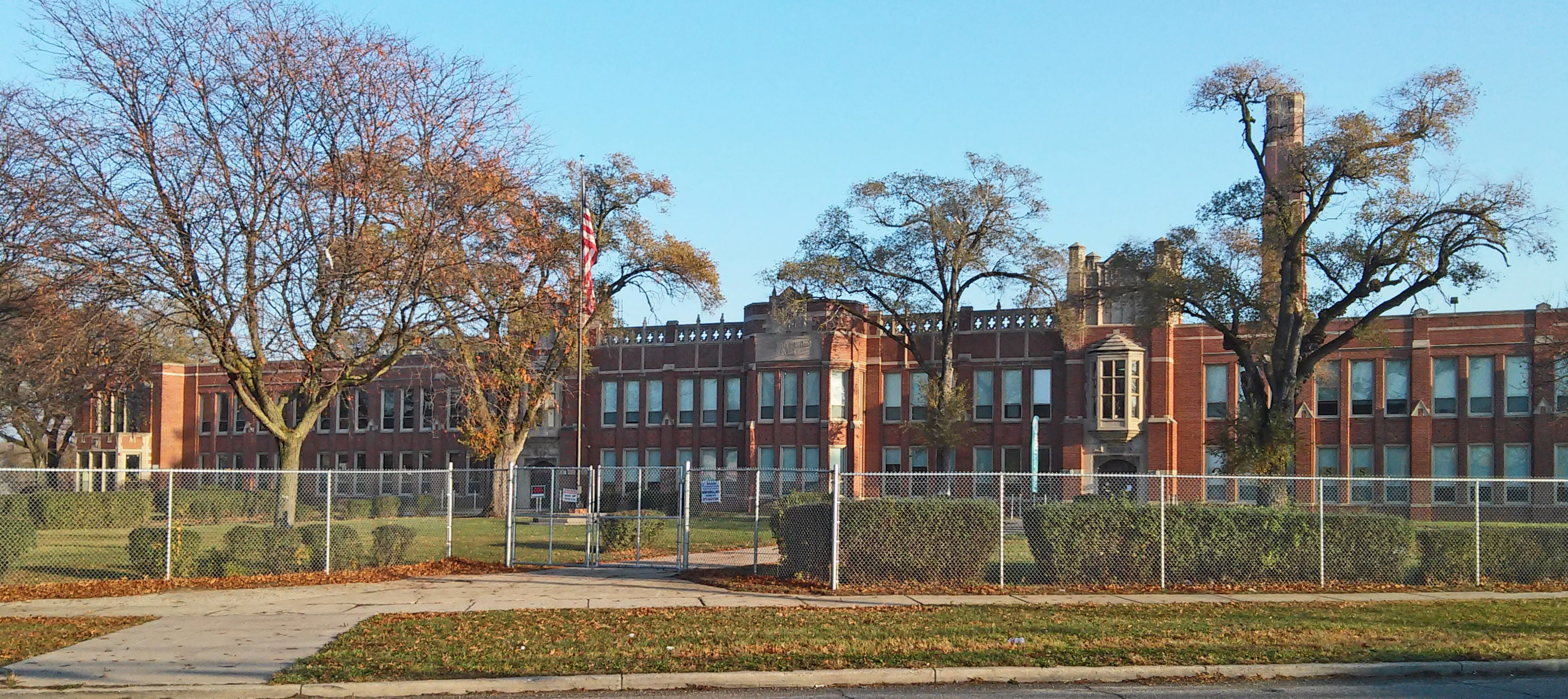

- Location within Michigan
- Interactive map
- Location: 13322 Conant St. Detroit, Michigan
- Coordinates: 42°24′44″N 83°3′29″W
- Built: 1927
- Architect: Donaldson and Meier
- Architectural style: Collegiate Gothic
- NRHP reference No.: 15000702
- Added to NRHP: October 5, 2015

The Elizabeth Cleveland Intermediate School, also known as Elizabeth Cleveland Middle School, is a historic building located at 13322 Conant Street in Detroit, Michigan. It was listed on the National Register of Historic Places in 2015. The school is an excellent example of Collegiate Gothic style, with no alteration to its exterior since construction. The building is still in use as a school, and now houses Frontier International Academy.

== History ==
The Detroit Public School District began planning for construction of the Elizabeth Cleveland Intermediate School in 1926, by acquiring land and engaging the architectural firm of Donaldson and Meier. Construction began in 1927, and opened to students in September of that year. The school remained a middle school until 2006, when it became a 6-12 school. The school closed in 2009, and remained vacant until 2012, when a charter school bought the property. In September 2013 the school partially reopened as the Frontier International Academy.

== Description ==
The Elizabeth Cleveland Intermediate School is located on a large corner lot, positioned diagonally facing the intersection. The building is a two-story orange brick flat-roofed structure, with the facade divided into nineteen bays. The central bay projects forward, and is surmounted by a high parapet wall. Two bays to either side of the center are a pair of entrance pavilions, topped with square turrets.

The entry pavilions contain terrazzo-floor vestibules. The building contains academic classrooms, four shops, a drafting room, two "clothing rooms," two "food centers," an auditorium, a gymnasium, pool, and locker rooms.
