= Robert Bobb =

American governmental official (born 1945)

Robert C. Bobb
- Born: May 23, 1945 (age 81); New Orleans, Louisiana, U.S.
- Education: Grambling State University, bachelor's degree Western Michigan University, MS (1978)
- Occupations: Emergency financial manager former city ma
- Title: Emergency Financial Manager of Detroit Public Schools
- Term: 2009-2011
- Successor: Jack Martin
- Board member of: Past president National Forum for Black Public Administrators and City of Oakland Black Chamber of Commerce
- Awards: ICMA 4 awards for innovation, 1 for career development
- Website: Robert Bobb, Emergency Financial Manager

Robert C. Bobb is a former appointed official who was the Emergency Financial Manager for the Detroit Public Schools until 2011. In addition to having been employed by the school district, he received a salary from private foundations that promote school choice and privatization, and he owns a private/public sector consulting firm.

Bobb's previous position was president of the Washington, D.C. board of education from 2006 to 2009. Before that he was the longest-serving African-American city manager in the United States, with a total of 30 years employment in the field.

== Early life and education ==
Bobb was born in New Orleans, Louisiana and grew up on a plantation in southwest Louisiana where his grandmother worked as a maid. He worked his way through college buffing floors during the school year and laboring in sulfur pits during the summers. He received a bachelor's degree in political science from Grambling State University and an MS in business studies from Western Michigan University in 1978. He is also a 2005 graduate of the Broad Foundation's Superintendent Academy, a ten-month-long course similar to an executive training program.

== Career ==
=== City manager ===
He acted as a city manager for a total of 30 years for the cities of Kalamazoo, Michigan (1977–1984 ); Santa Ana, California; Richmond, Virginia (1986–1997); Oakland, California (1997–2003); and Washington, D.C.(2003–2006).

During Bobb's tenure at Oakland, California, the city was governed under a new and unique hybrid system which combined a strong, elected mayor with a full-time professional city manager. Critics had warned of stalemate if the mayor and city manager were to lock horns, but the system appeared to be working for the first two years as the city's bureaucracies were restructured and new policies were adopted. However, in 2003, during a dispute regarding a new stadium for the Oakland Athletics baseball team, Bobb, who was a major stadium advocate, was dismissed by then-mayor Jerry Brown, who believed housing should be built on the site instead.

From 2003 until 2006, Bobb held the position of city manager and deputy mayor in Washington, D.C. under Anthony A. Williams where he managed 20,000 employees and an $8 billion budget. He traveled to China in 2004 to represent Washington at the World Mega Cities Economic and Cultural Development Conference. In 2006, a cabinet-level employee was erroneously overpaid $75,000 over a six-month period and asked to keep the overpayment. The District, under an obscure rule, can waive collection of an overpayment if it "would be against good conscience and not in the best interests of the District government." Bobb approved the employee's request to keep the $75,000 but was overridden by the personnel office, which said that Bobb lacked the sole authority to make such a decision. Bobb resigned that year to run an ultimately successful campaign for president of the D.C. Board of Education.

=== Emergency financial manager ===
In March 2009, Michigan governor Jennifer Granholm appointed Bobb as emergency financial manager for the Detroit Public Schools, which at the time had 172 schools, 85,000 students, and a deficit of $219 million. At the end of Bobb's first year as financial manager, the deficit had increased to $363 million, according to budget documents released by the school district in June 2010.

Bobb said he took on the job because Detroit had the "roughest and the toughest" urban schools and because he understood "the dynamics, the grit, the opportunities that are prevalent in urban America." In addition to his management of the schools' finances, he created master plans for education reforms including standards required to pass to the next grade level, and offered plans for facilities improvement and community involvement. He used $500 million in federal stimulus money to improve facilities and led a successful enrollment drive resulting in 900 more students than projected. He called for 2,600 volunteers to donate 180 hours each to help students learn to read.

His tenure as emergency manager was beset with controversies related to school closings, job cuts and the elimination and outsourcing of school services. During his first ten months on the job he closed 29 schools and hired outside consultants to improve 17 schools. When it appeared that consolidation of high schools and large class sizes could cause tension and violence, he rehired 137 guidance counselors he had laid off, and rehired 20 piano teachers so that music education could continue.

Bobb was paid an annual salary of $280,000 by the government and $145,000 by the Kellogg Foundation and the Broad Foundation, a national promoter of school choice and privatization. Bobb is also the owner, president and CEO of the LAPA Group, LLC, a private/public sector consulting firm.

His appointment was to expire on March 1, 2011. At that time, he was given expanded powers by the state legislature, including the powers to modify contracts, terminate collective bargaining agreements with teachers and fire elected officials. He said he intended to use these powers, and issued layoff notices to all of the teachers in the school system, which gave the power to call back or reassign teachers without having to consider seniority rights. Bobb also proposed that as many as forty one DPS schools that he scheduled for closure be turned instead into privatized charter schools.

During the COVID-19 pandemic, Bobb was appointed the co-chair of the ReOpen DC Committee in Washington, D.C..

== Awards and civic activities ==
Bobb has received the L.P. Cookingham Award for Career Development and four Innovation Awards from the International City Management Association. He was also given the Marks of Excellence Award by the National Forum of Black Public Administrators, and was named public official of the year by Governing magazine. In 2010, Walsh College, a private business school headquartered in Troy, Michigan, invited Bobb to give a commencement speech and conferred an honorary Doctor of Laws degree upon him following the speech.

Bobb is a past president of National Forum for Black Public Administrators and the City of Oakland Black Chamber of Commerce. He is also a member of Phi Beta Sigma fraternity, and holds a lifetime membership in the NAACP.

Bobb is a Fellow of the National Academy of Public Administration (United States).

== Electoral history ==
2006 President of Board of Education of D.C., Nonpartisan election
Candidate	Votes	%
Robert C. Bobb	46,513	44
Caroline Graham	37,126	35
Timothy Jenkins	13,437	13
Laurent Ross	5,056	5
Sunday Abraham	3,046	3
Write-in	977	1
Turnout	114,876	29%
