= Central High School (Detroit) =

Secondary school in Detroit, Michigan, United States

Coordinates: 42°23′1.6″N 83°6′43.3″W

Location
- 2425 Tuxedo Street; Detroit, Michigan; United States

Information
- Former name: Central Collegiate Academy
- Type: Public high school
- School district: Detroit Public Schools Community District
- Principal: LaToyia Webb
- Teaching staff: 25.30 (FTE)
- Grades: 9–12
- Enrollment: 392 (2023–2024)
- Student to teacher ratio: 15.49
- Area: Urban
- Colors: Navy and White
- Athletics conference: Detroit Public School League
- Team name: Trailblazers
- Website: central.detroitk12.org
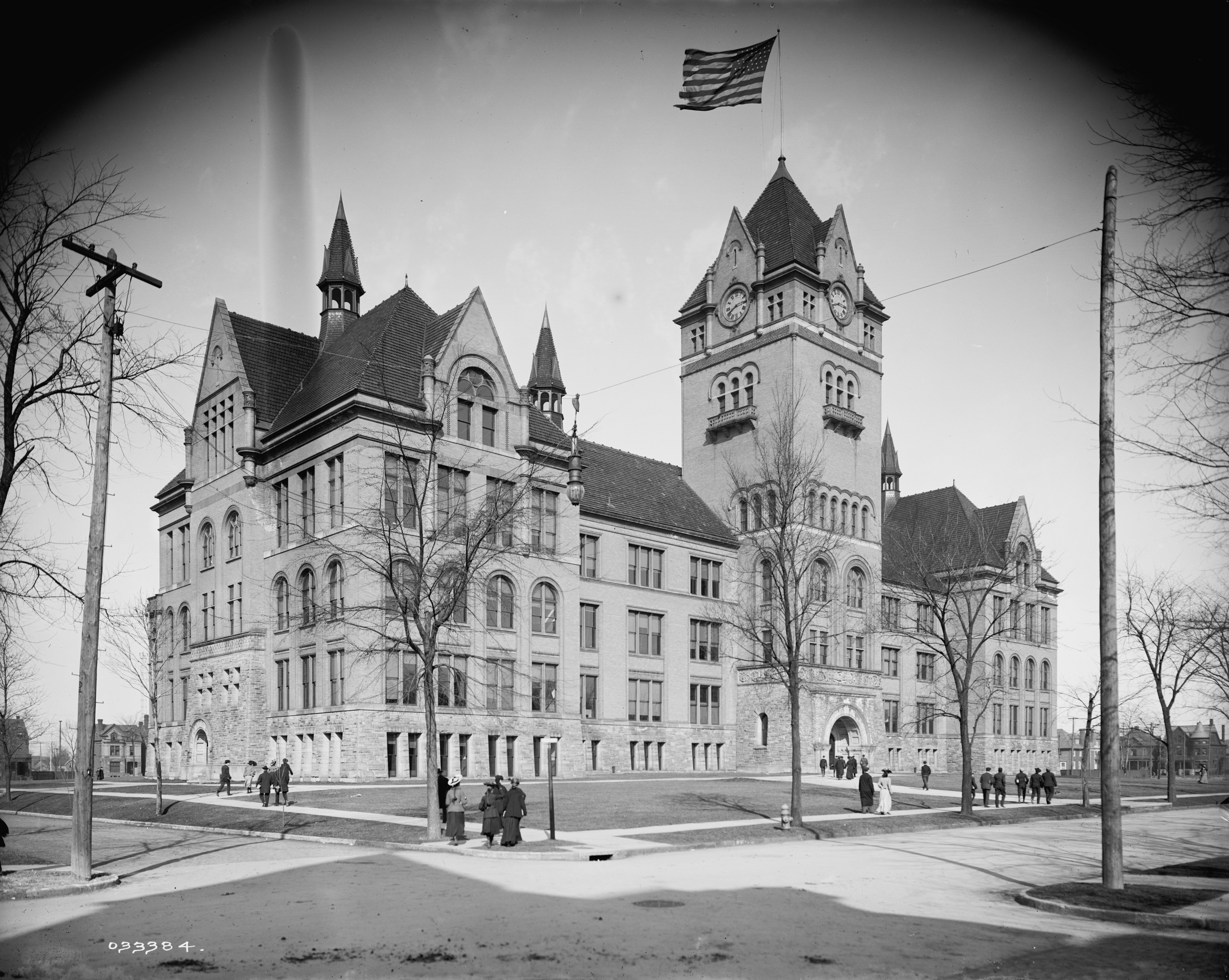
- Central High School in 1904; this building is now Old Main at Wayne State University

Student assessments
- 2021–22 school year Change vs. prior year

M-STEP 11th grade proficiency rates (Science / Social Studies)
- Advanced %: ≤10 / ≤10
- Proficient %: ≤10 / ≤10
- PR. Proficient %: – / –
- Not Proficient %: – / –

Average test scores
- SAT Total: 744.3 (▼ −30.7)

Central High School, previously Central Collegiate Academy and originally named Central High School, is the oldest public high school in Detroit, Michigan; it is part of the Detroit Public Schools Community District.

The school's student body is about 98 percent African-American and 90 percent are categorized as economically disadvantaged.

== History ==
In 1858, Detroit's first high school opened on Miami Avenue. By 1863, increased enrollment caused the school to be moved to a building that had formerly housed the State Capitol, becoming Capitol High School. In 1871, the University of Michigan granted accreditation to the school.

In 1893, a fire destroyed Capitol High School, but it continued to function temporarily at the Biddle House on East Jefferson Avenue. In 1896, Capitol was replaced by Central High School, at the intersection of Cass and Warren Avenue; the structure is still in use as Wayne State University's Old Main.

In 1904, innovative educator David Mackenzie returned to his hometown as the new principal of Central High School. By 1913, under Mackenzie's direction, a one-year, college-level premedical curriculum was established at Central High, the first junior college curriculum organized in Michigan. In 1916, the program was extended to two years, and in 1917 the state legislature approved Mackenzie's plans for establishing the Detroit Junior College, forerunner of Wayne State University. In 1919, David Mackenzie was officially appointed first Dean of the college.

In 1926, a further increase in the student population caused Central High School to be moved to its current location, at 2425 Tuxedo Street.

In the fall of 2015, several former students from Highland Park Renaissance High School, a high school in Highland Park which closed earlier that year, enrolled in Central. To help the Highland Park students adjust, David Oclander, the principal of Central, established a "dean of culture" at the school.

In 2017, the school returned to being run by Detroit Public Schools after having been part of the Educational Achievement Authority. Also in the fall of 2017 Durfee Elementary/Middle School was relocated to the Central High School building. Central High School was limited to only one of the building's three floors. This was possible because Central had declined to only 350 students, with 600 students at Durfee. In its heyday Central High School had had an enrollment of 4,000 students.

== Athletics ==
As Detroit's oldest high school, Central has enjoyed a tradition of athletic success.

Central High School dominated city league men's basketball during the early twentieth century, winning championship titles in 1906, 1907 and 1909. Despite the absence of tournament play (1910–1919), Central High was a perennial fixture atop the standings at season's end.

CHS also won city tournament titles in 1934, 1942 and 1980. In 1998, Coach Oronde Taliaferro marched his Trailblazers through the postseason, all the way to the Michigan High School Athletic Association championship game. In the final, Central dispatched Belleville High 63-47 to claim the state title.

The Girls Volleyball team was led by Coach Matt Dixon and won 3 city championships in a row (1990, 1991, and 1992), with both of the setters (Nachele Ebo and Demetria Keys) earned Division 1 scholarships.

During the 1980s, Central's track and field program stamped an indelible mark in the record books; Coach Woody Thomas and his track men won a total of four MHSAA team titles - in 1980, 81, 82 and 1984.

== Notable alumni ==
- Richard Degener, University of Michigan NCAA titlist and 1932, 1936 Olympic medalist in diving
- Neil Snow, college football player
- Frank Reiber, Major League Baseball (MLB) player
- Melvin Calvin received the 1961 Nobel Prize in Chemistry
- Jerome Horwitz (1937) spearheaded the research effort resulting in development of AZT, an antiviral drug used to treat HIV
- Michael Dann (1939) was a former senior vice president of programming for CBS television
- William Davidson (1940) was a sports entrepreneur who owned the Detroit Pistons and Tampa Bay Lightning
- James Lipton (1944), host of Inside the Actors Studio; dean of master’s program at New York's New School for Social Research
- Norman Wexler (1944) wrote the screenplays for the films Joe, Serpico and Saturday Night Fever
- Philip Levine (1946), recipient of the Pulitzer Prize for Poetry and the National Book Award for Poetry. He was the 2011-2012 United States Poet Laureate.
- Sander Levin (1949), United States Representative (D-Michigan)
- Kenneth Jay Lane, costume jewelry designer and socialite
- Antoinette Garnes, soprano singer
- Gael Greene (1951), food critic and author
- Eli Broad (1951), billionaire and philanthropist
- Elissa P. Benedek (1954), child and adolescent psychiatrist, forensic psychiatrist
- Carl Levin (1954), United States Senator (D-Michigan)
- Freda Payne, singer, best known for "Band of Gold"
- Anita Baker (1976), multiple Grammy Award-winning singer
- Thomas Wilcher (1982) was a ten-time MHSAA track champion and varsity football player at Central; also All-American track athlete for the University of Michigan
- Antonio Gates (1998), NFL Hall of Fame tight end for the San Diego Chargers of the National Football League, 9-time Pro Bowl selection
- Melville Hatch, entomologist
