= Edmund Atkinson School =

United States historic building

- U.S. National Register of Historic Places
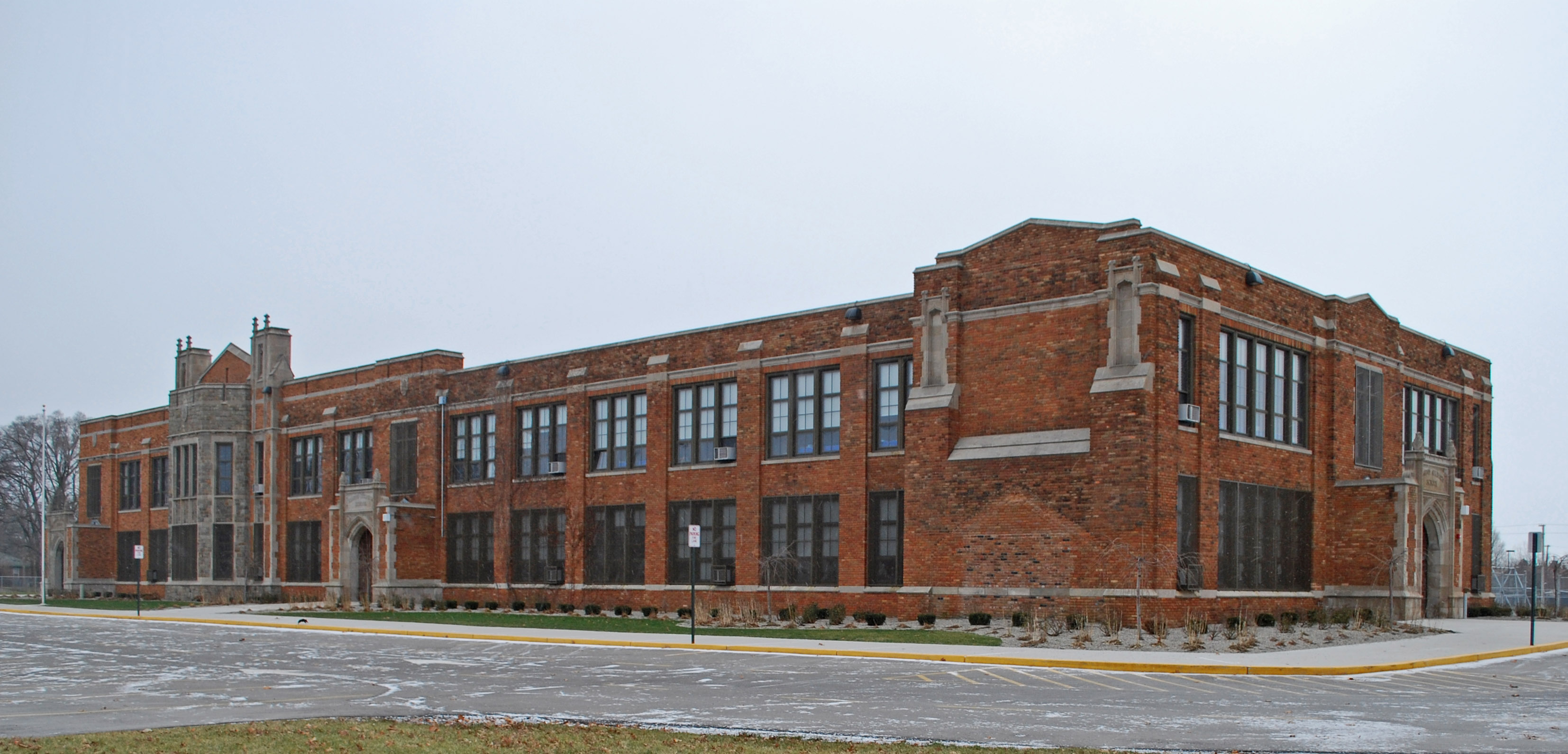
- Interactive map
- Location: 4900 East Hildale Street; Detroit, Michigan
- Coordinates: 42°25′45″N 83°03′16″W
- Area: less than one acre
- Built: 1927
- Architect: McGrath, Dohmen & Page
- Architectural style: Late Gothic Revival
- MPS: Public Schools of Detroit MPS
- NRHP reference No.: 10000635
- Added to NRHP: December 12, 2011

The Edmund Atkinson School is a school building located at 4900 East Hildale Street in Detroit, Michigan. It is currently operating as Legacy Charter Academy. It was listed on the National Register of Historic Places in 2011.

== History ==
Edmund Atkinson was a Detroit lawyer who served on the city council from 1900 to 1904, and worked as Assistant Corporation Council for the city and for the Detroit Board of Education. His namesake, the Edmund Atkinson School, was designed as a multi-unit school by the architectural firm of McGrath, Dohmen, & Page. The first unit was built in 1927 with a capacity for 580 pupils in kindergarten through eighth grade. It opened the following year, serving students who were primarily first generation immigrants from Eastern European or the Middle East, as well as African American students.

The second unit, containing an auditorium, gymnasium, practical arts room, three classrooms and a combination lunch/playroom, was built in 1931. The third unit planned by McGrath, Dohmen, & Page was never built; however, a temporary building with two self-contained classrooms was installed in 1955, and by 1961, the school was serving 880 students in kindergarten through sixth grade. Detroit Public Schools closed the building in 2007, and in 2010 sold it to National Heritage Academy for $600,000. The new owners invested $6 million to renovate the building, and reopened it in the fall of 2010 as Legacy Charter Academy. The academy began with K–5 grades, and expanded to K–8.

== Description ==
Atkinson School was built as two major units. The original 1927 unit is a two-story symmetrical orange-brick and random range ashlar, Collegiate Gothic Revival structure five bays wide. The central entrance bay has a projecting entrance vestibule on the first floor with a compound Gothic arch above. The flanking bays contain large openings with groupings of windows, while the outer bays contain a single window opening per floor. The side of the building contains nine bays and a single entrance.

The connecting 1931 unit, also of orange brick, begins at the end of the nine-bay span of the first unit with a tower-like bay containing groupings of windows and a third entrance. The unit continues with a two-story rear elevation. All entrances and towers have limestone surrounds and quoining.

== See also ==
- National Register of Historic Places listings in Detroit, Michigan
