= Southeastern High School (Michigan) =

High school in Detroit, Wayne County, Michigan

Coordinates: 42.3747°N 82.9786°W

Location
- 3030 Fairview Street; Detroit, Michigan 48214; United States

Information
- Motto: "Age Quod Agis" (Finish What You Begin)
- Established: 1917
- School district: Detroit Public Schools
- Principal: Maurice El-Amin
- Teaching staff: 36.70 (FTE)
- Grades: 9–12
- Student to teacher ratio: 17.33
- Colors: Purple and white
- Nickname: Jungaleers
- Newspaper: The Jungaleer
- Yearbook: The Amethyst
- Website: School website

Student assessments
- 2021–22 school year Change vs. prior year

M-STEP 11th grade proficiency rates (Science / Social Studies)
- Advanced %: ≤5 / ≤5
- Proficient %: ≤5 / ≤5
- PR. Proficient %: – / –
- Not Proficient %: – / –

Average test scores
- SAT Total: 781.3 (▼ −56.7)

Southeastern High School of Technology and Law is a public coeducational secondary school in Detroit, Michigan, United States. It is operated by the Detroit Public Schools. DPS resumed control of Southeastern High in Fall 2017.

== History ==
Southeastern High School opened its doors on January 2, 1917. The school was built in a semi-rural area that had recently become a part of the city of Detroit. When the school was built, it was so removed from the central city of Detroit that it was considered to be out in the jungle, which was the origin of the school's nickname, the "Jungaleers".

Southeastern High School's enrollment following World War II was among the highest of any high school in the state. Even as recently as 2008, its enrollment was 2,428. In 2011–2012, the school's enrollment was 790.

The school district recently changed the school's official name from Southeastern High School to Southeastern High School of Technology and Law, as its curriculum has a strong emphasis on both these areas.

== Athletics ==
The Jungaleers compete in the Detroit Public School League (PSL) and are members of the Michigan High School Athletic Association(MHSAA).

Southeastern participates in boys' and girls' basketball, boys' and girls' cross country, football, boys' lacrosse, softball, girls' swim and dive, boys' track and field and volleyball.

Southeastern won PSL football championships in 1957, 1964, 2005, 2008 and 2009 and also in 2020.

The Jungaleers won back-to-back PSL championships in boys' basketball in 1925 and 1926, and also won championships in 1939, 1941 and 1956. More recently, Southeastern won the PSL boys basketball championship in 2011.

For the first 31 years of the MHSAA boys' basketball state championship tournament, the PSL did not participate in the tournament, and decided they would have their own tournament among the PSL high schools instead. It wasn't until 1962 that the PSL began playing in the MHSAA boys' basketball state tournament. Since 1962, and through 2015, the PSL has won fourteen MHSAA state championships in Class A, four in Class B, one in Class C, and three in Class D, for a total of twenty-two state boys' basketball championships.

In 2011 and 2013, the Jungaleers were MHSAA boys' basketball state championship finalists.

== Publications ==
The school's yearbook was originally titled The Aryan, which was changed to The Amethyst in 1967.

The school's newspaper was originally the S.E. Booster, which became The Jungaleer in 1927.

== Notable alumni ==
- Annette Beard (1961), member of the Motown singing group Martha and the Vandellas; Rock and Roll Hall of Fame inductee
- Steve Beck (1983), NBA player with the Phoenix Suns
- William "Bull" Bullard (2002), member of the Harlem Globetrotters
- Lt. George H. Cannon (1933), first U.S. Marine in World War II to receive the Medal of Honor
- Gmac Cash (2011), American comedy rapper
- Dennis Cole (1958), film and television actor
- Dej Loaf (2009), musician, recording artist, and songwriter
- William Gholston (2010), NFL player with the Tampa Bay Buccaneers
- Johnathan Hankins (2010), NFL player with the Dallas Cowboys
- Betty Hutton (attended), film actress
- Don Lund (1941), MLB player with the Detroit Tigers; University of Michigan baseball head coach
- John C. Mackie (1938), former member of the United States House of Representatives
- Cyrus Mann (1975), NBA player with the Boston Celtics
- Nate Rollins (1980), NBA player with the Kansas City Kings
- Bart Scott (1998), NFL player with the New York Jets
- Ralph Simpson (attended), NBA player with the Chicago Bulls
- Henry Washington (1975), MLB player with the Detroit Tigers
