= Detroit School of Arts =

American public magnet high school

Detroit School of Arts High School
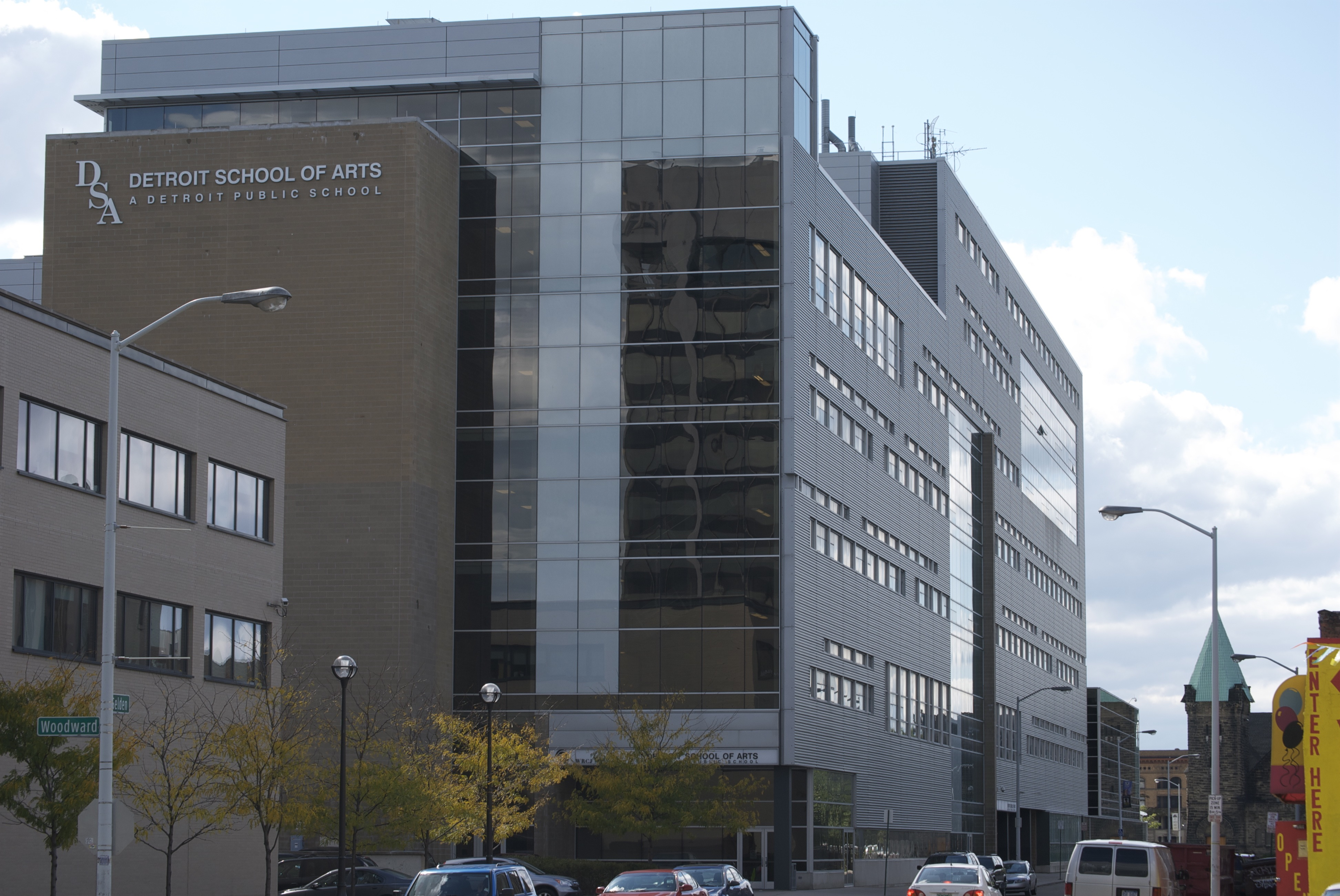
- Detroit School of Arts

Location
- 123 Selden Avenue; Detroit, Michigan 48201; United States; 42°20′54.4″N 83°3′41.2″W

Information
- School type: Public, magnet high school
- Motto: Discovering Truth through Intellect and Talent
- Established: 1992
- School board: Detroit Public Schools
- Principal: Lisa Reynolds (2018-present)
- Faculty: 40+
- Grades: 9–12
- Enrollment: 500
- Mascot: Achievers
- Affiliation: Detroit Public Schools
- Website: www.detroitk12.org/DSA

Student assessments
- 2021–22 school year Change vs. prior year

M-STEP 11th grade proficiency rates (Science / Social Studies)
- Advanced %: ≤5 / ≤5
- Proficient %: – / –
- PR. Proficient %: 9.2 / 52.9
- Not Proficient %: 77.3 / 37.8

Average test scores
- SAT Total: 819.7 (▼ −11.4)

The Detroit School of Arts (DSA), originally known as the Detroit High School for the Fine and Performing Arts, is a public, magnet high school located in Midtown Detroit, Michigan.

The Detroit School of Arts is a part of the Detroit Public Schools district. Entrance to Detroit School of Arts is based on an audition that takes place at the end of a student's eighth grade year. Students are required to declare a major of study i.e. Dance, Theatre, Instrumental Music, etc. It is one of four magnet schools in Detroit, where the others are Renaissance High School, Cass Technical High School and Communication & Media Arts High School. Entrance is based on test scores and middle school grades.

== History ==
Originally named The Detroit High School for the Fine and Performing Arts, The Detroit School of Arts was established in 1992 by Dr. Denise Davis-Cotton. Dr. Davis-Cotton served as a principal to the school from 1992 until her retirement in 2010. During the eight hour school day, students follow a rigorous college preparatory curriculum with an intensive study in their chosen major of creative and/or performing arts. When founded, the school held classes in a building known as the Wilbur Wright School prior. This building was located at 4333 Rosa Parks Boulevard in Detroits Woodbridge neighborhood. As enrollment grew and arts instruction continued, the school was met with challenges. The building, which was erected in 1929, was overcrowded and began decaying rapidly causing several health hazards.

In 2003, construction began on a new building nearby in Detroit's Midtown. This modern six floor building was to consist of state of the art recording studios, band and choir rooms, art studio spaces, professional green rooms, a large auditorium, and a recital hall named after alumna Aaliyah. The building was opened to DSA students and staff in 2005 and is still occupied by the school. DSA's building is also the home of Detroit's Jazz and Classical radio station WRCJ-FM.

The Wilbur Wright School building was left behind, later being marked as abandoned, and eventually demolished.

== Accolades and awards ==
The school received the Kennedy Center Creative Ticket National Arts School of Distinction Award for the 2002–2003 school year. On May 22, 2012, DSA became the Detroit Public Schools System's first self-governing school.

== Notable alumni ==
- Aaliyah, singer and actress
- Teairra Marí, singer and actress; First woman signed to Roc-a-Fella Records
- Celia Keenan-Bolger, Tony award-winning actress
- Dhamari Trice-Hanson, Entrepreneur and Music Producer
