= Crockett High School (Michigan) =

High school in Detroit, Wayne County, Michigan

- Detroit; United States

Information
- Other name: Crockett Vocational/Technical Center
- Type: High school
- Established: 1994
- Closed: 2012
- School district: Detroit Public Schools Community District

Crockett High School, also known as the Crockett Vocational/Technical Center, was a senior high school operated during 1994–2012 by Detroit Public Schools and located in Detroit.

Crockett occupied the former Burroughs Middle School. The building first opened in 1924. It received a $3.5 million bond investment prior to its 2012 closure. It merged with Finney High School to form the newly constructed East English Village High School.
