= Detroit City High School =

Coordinates: 42°23′40.1″N 83°06′47.7″W

Location
- 13141 Rosa Parks Blvd. Detroit, MI 48238 (2007–2012); 3500 McGraw Ave. Detroit, MI 48208 (1992–2006); United States

Information
- School district: Detroit Public
- Grades: 9-12
- Colors: Navy, Orange, & White
- Mascot: Bears
- Website: detroitk12.org

Detroit City High School was a secondary school located in Detroit, Michigan, United States. It was one of the many public high schools in the Detroit Public School District. It closed in 2012 and demolished in 2016.

== Sources ==
- Trulia info
- USNews and World Report
