= Renaissance High School (Michigan) =

Location
- 6565 W. Outer Drive; Detroit, Michigan; United States; 42.4180852°N 83.1949095°W

Information
- School type: Public, magnet high school
- Motto: "A School for the Mind, A Mind for the Future"
- Established: 1978
- School district: Detroit Public Schools
- Principal: Verynda Stroughter
- Teaching staff: 58.28 (FTE)
- Grades: 9–12
- Enrollment: 1,171 (2023–2024)
- Student to teacher ratio: 20.09
- Colors: Maroon and white
- Mascot: Phoenix
- Website: detroitk12.org/schools/renaissance

Renaissance High School is a public, magnet high school in the city of Detroit, Michigan. Founded in 1978 on the former site of Catholic Central High School, Renaissance graduated its first senior class in 1981. In 2005, a new building was dedicated at the site of the former Sinai Hospital.

Renaissance is one of four magnet high schools in the Detroit Public Schools district; (the others being Cass Technical High School, Detroit School of Arts, and Communication & Media Arts High School). Entrance is based on test scores and middle school grades.

== Academics ==
Student assessments
- 2021–22 school year Change vs. prior year

M-STEP 11th grade proficiency rates (Science / Social Studies)
- Advanced %: ≤5 / ≤5
- Proficient %: – / –
- PR. Proficient %: 11.9 / 48.2
- Not Proficient %: 74.3 / 27.2

Average test scores
- SAT Total: 965.4 (▼ −10.4)

Students at Renaissance must take seven courses a semester and complete 200 community service hours in order to graduate. Although students take only six courses a day, their schedules rotate to accomplish the seven course requirement. One way that the school provides for students to fulfill the 200-hour service requirement is through its JROTC (Junior Reserve Officers Training Corps) program.

=== Admissions ===
Admission to the school is selective. Originally, 8th and 9th grade students from public and private schools took a proficiency exam before admission. A combination of a student's grades in middle school or junior high and the exam score determined school admission. This policy was changed in 1994 to let transfer students attend the school, although they must fulfill the same graduation requirements as other students. In 2006, over 75% of the student body was African-American. Renaissance opened in 1978 with first-year ("freshman") and second-year ("sophomore") students. Its first four-year graduating class received their diplomas in June 1982.

== Notable alumni ==
- Janeé Ayers: Detroit City Council member at-large
- Andrew Keenan-Bolger: Broadway actor
- Ronald Bartell: NFL player for the Oakland Raiders
- Joe Crawford: basketball player for Maccabi Rishon of Israel
- Robin Givhan: Fashion editor for the Washington Post and Pulitzer Prize-winning writer
- Malik Hairston: NBA player
- Alaric Jackson, NFL player for the Los Angeles Rams and Super Bowl LVI champion
- Donavan McKinney, politician
- Simone Missick, actor
- Rickey Paulding: NBA player drafted by The Detroit Pistons
- Tajuan Porter: Former Oregon Ducks basketball player
- Diona Reasonover, actor
- Ronald Talley: NFL player
- Lawrence Thomas: NFL player for the New York Jets
- Justin Turner: professional basketball player for the Motor City Cruise of the NBA G League.
