= East English Village Preparatory Academy =

High school in Detroit, Michigan

Coordinates: 42°24′28.9″N 82°55′44.3″W

East English Village Preparatory Academy (EEVPA) is a magnet high school in Detroit, Michigan. It is a part of Detroit Public Schools.

The school was built on the original site of Finney High School. It opened in 2012.

== Campus ==
The $46.3 million, 221,000-square-foot (20,500 m^{2}) campus has room for up to 1,200 students. It has four academic wings, including a performing arts wing. The school features a media center, an athletic complex with a community health clinic, and eight science laboratories.

== Academics ==
Student assessments
- 2021–22 school year Change vs. prior year

M-STEP 11th grade proficiency rates (Science / Social Studies)
- Advanced %: ≤5 / ≤5
- Proficient %: ≤5 / ≤5
- PR. Proficient %: ≤5 / –
- Not Proficient %: – / –

Average test scores
- SAT Total: 751.7 (▼ −10.9)

=== Admissions ===
The school has an attendance boundary which automatically grants students living within that area admission to the school. Students living outside of the boundary have to apply to the school and undergo an interview. The prospective students must have at least a 2.5 GPA.

== Notable alumni ==
- David DeJulius (born 1999) - basketball player for Maccabi Tel Aviv of the Israeli Basketball Premier League
- Chauncey Golston - NFL player
- Desjuan Johnson - NFL player, Mr. Irrelevant of the 2023 NFL draft
- Desmond King - NFL player
