= Detroit Public Schools Community District =

Public school system of Detroit, Michigan

Address
- 3011 West Grand Boulevard Detroit, Wayne County, Michigan, 48202; United States

District information
- Type: Public
- Grades: PreKindergarten–12
- Established: December 4, 1842; 183 years ago
- Superintendent: Nikolai Vitti
- Schools: 104
- Budget: $1,123,593,000 2022–2023 expenditures
- NCES District ID: 2601103

Students and staff
- Students: 48,848 (2024–2025)
- Teachers: 3,031.85 (on an FTE basis) (2024–2025)
- Staff: 6,928.08 FTE (2024–2025)
- Student–teacher ratio: 16.11 (2024–2025)
- Athletic conference: Detroit Public School League (DPSL)

Other information
- Teachers' union: Detroit Federation of Teachers
- Website: www.detroitk12.org

Detroit Public Schools Community District (DPSCD) is a public school district that serves Detroit, Michigan, and high school students in Highland Park, Michigan. The district, which replaced the original Detroit Public Schools (DPS) in 2016, provides services to approximately 50,000 students, making it the largest school district in the state. The district has its headquarters in the Fisher Building of the New Center area of Detroit.

The school district has experienced extensive financial difficulties over a series of years. From 1999 to 2005, and from 2009 to the reorganization in 2016, the district was overseen by a succession of state-appointed emergency financial managers.

== History ==
=== Before founding ===
In 1816, Presbyterian missionary John Monteith formed a classical school in George Meldrum's house on Woodbridge near Shelby Street. The next year, he established a comprehensive school for all grades, including a college, in collaboration of Gabriel Richard, Augustus Woodward, Lewis Cass and William Woodbridge. Its grade school program failed, but the university program moved to Ann Arbor in 1827 and ultimately became the University of Michigan.

Detroit attempted to establish a public school in 1827, but the teacher it hired died immediately. As of 1840, private schools were plentiful for the city's 2,000 school-aged children whose parents could afford them, and the Free School Society struggled to meet the need for school for the poor through sales of baked goods and tomato catsup.

=== 1842 to 1999 ===
Under the leadership of mayor Zina Pitcher, a proper public school system was founded in 1842. Thirteen schools were immediately established, all in temporary quarters such as homes and churches. However, as Detroit flourished, 88 schools were built between 1856 and 1900. The schools were segregated until 1871.

A high school, then called Capitol High School, was founded in 1858. After the state legislature vacated its Detroit capitol building and moved to Lansing, the high school moved to its former building in 1863. The building burned in 1893, and in 1896 it moved to a grand new building and became Central High School. The building is today known as Old Main.

Another one of the first schools was Cass Union School, on the corner of Grand River and Second Street. It was built in 1860. The precursor to Cass Technical High School was founded in 1907 within this building. It moved to new buildings in 1912, 1922, and 2005, and became Detroit's flagship high school.

Between 1910 and 1930, 180 schools were built. At its peak enrollment in 1966, the district had nearly 300,000 students.

Enrollment in Detroit Public Schools
Year	Enrollment	Change from previous figure
1842	2,093	—
1875	13,739	+11,646
1890	23,916	+10,177
1900	39,150	+15,234
1966	299,962	+260,812
1980	211,825	−88,137
2000	168,213	−43,612
2015	47,238	−120,975
2025	48,848	+1,610

=== 1999 to present ===
==== School closures ====
As the city as a whole struggled with declining population and job losses, enrollment plummeted and schools closed, leaving abandoned schools throughout the city. Michigan's Schools of Choice law, which allowed students to attend schools outside of the city, the opening of new charter schools, and the deterioration of the district's older school buildings contributed to a crisis for the district in the early 21st century. Enrollment dropped by 84 percent between 1966 and 2015, and 287 schools closed between 1975 and 2015, with 195 of those between 2000 and 2015. Of those, 81 schools were left vacant. The closure of schools was disruptive to students and neighborhoods. Many of the district's efforts to secure its closed schools failed or were inadequate, creating blight and opportunities to illegally salvage building materials.

Facilities were also improved during this period. Detroit voters approved bond issues in 1994 and 2009 that funded new schools such as Cass Technical High School (2005), Detroit School of Arts (2005),, Renaissance High School (2005), Martin Luther King Jr. Senior High School (2011), Mumford High School (2012), and East English Village Preparatory Academy (2012). The district continues to reinvest in and build new facilities as of 2026, according to its $700 million Facility Master Plan. Planned new schools include replacements for Frank Cody High School and Pershing High School.

==== Financial crisis ====
Declining enrollment created a financial crisis for the district. In 1999, the Michigan Legislature removed the locally elected board of education amid allegations of mismanagement and replaced it with a 7-member reform board. Six board members were appointed by the mayor and one appointed by the state superintendent of public instruction. The elected board of education returned following a city referendum in 2005. The first election of the new eleven member board of education, with four chosen at-large and seven by district, occurred on November 8, 2005. At the time the district's enrollment was slowly increasing and it had a $100 million surplus.

Before the district occupied the Fisher Building, its headquarters were in the Macabees Building in Midtown Detroit. The district paid the owner of the Fisher Building $24.1 million in 2002 so the district could occupy five floors in the building. This was more than the owner of the Fisher Building paid to buy the building one year earlier. The district's emergency financial manager, Robert Bobb, said in 2009 that he was investigating how the school board agreed to the lease in the Fisher Building. Reginald Turner, who served on Detroit School Board from 2000 to 2003, said that he was told that it would be less expensive to occupy the Fisher Building than it would to remodel the Maccabees Building.

On a 66% margin the voters agreed to return to having an elected school board in November 2004. The board was selected in November 2005 and began its term in January 2006. The final full year that the board was in full control was the 2007–2008 fiscal year. By that time DPS had a $200 million deficit. The district's deficit was $369.5 million by the end of the 2007–2008 fiscal year, and its long-term debt was $1.5 billion.

==== Emergency financial management ====
The District was under a state-appointed Emergency Manager from 2009 to 2017. The Emergency Manager had powers to make all financial decisions unilaterally. From 2009 to 2011, DPS finances were managed by Robert Bobb, and from 2011 to January 2015, by Roy Roberts who was appointed by Governor Rick Snyder. In January 2015, Governor Snyder appointed Darnell Earley as Roberts' successor. Earley resigned in February 2016 in the wake of criticism of his decision, when he was Emergency Manager over Flint, Michigan, to switch that city's water supply to the Flint River, resulting in the Flint water crisis.

On December 8, 2008, State Superintendent of Public Instruction Mike Flanagan determined the district's inability to manage its finances and declared a financial emergency. Michigan Governor Jennifer Granholm appointed Robert Bobb as the emergency financial manager of Detroit Public Schools in 2009. His contract dictated a one-year tenure. The school district began selling 27 previously closed school buildings. On March 3, 2009, Bobb estimated that DPS's current year deficit would be greater than $150M, and requested early payments from the state to meet payroll. He declared that additional outside auditors would be required to properly assess the district's financial situation.

Twenty million dollars of the March 2009 debt was owed to the district's pension system. The DPS school board complained in 2009 that the deficit of $65 million for 2007–2008 school year was caused by accounting irregularities, including fringe benefits and paying teachers off of the books. Much of the deficit was discovered by outside auditors hired by former district Superintendent Connie Calloway in 2008.

In January 2009 Governor of Michigan Jennifer Granholm installed Robert Bobb as the emergency manager of DPS. She used Public Act 72 to appoint an emergency manager. Bobb closed 29 schools at the end of the 2008-2009 school year in order to save about $14 million per year. In November 2009, voters passed a $500.5 million construction bond issue that would rebuild and replace eight schools, renovate and demolish several others. This restructuring physically changed much of the district.

In September 2011, a new statewide district, Education Achievement Authority, was to take over some of Detroit's failing schools as selected by the emergency manager with up to 16 expected. The deficit was $763.7 million by the end of the 2013–2014 fiscal year, and at that time its long-term debt was $2.1 billion. On January 13, 2015, Darnell Earley was appointed as the new emergency manager for the school district by Snyder.

Highland Park Community High School of Highland Park Schools closed in 2015, and at that time DPS assumed responsibility for high school education of students in Highland Park, Michigan.

By January 2016 various DPS teachers made complaints about health and safety issues at DPS schools. DPS teachers were striking in various "sickouts" that resulted in schools closing. At that time DPS staff members were uploading images of poor conditions at DPS schools to Twitter, using the tag @teachDetroit.

In 2016 a hearing was scheduled for Norman Shy of Franklin, owner of Allstate Sales, a DPS vendor of school supplies. The associated court filings reflect a total of 12 DPS principals and 1 administrator allegedly conspired with Shy in a scheme to fill their own wallets by approving invoices for supplies the schools never received. The alleged corruption started in 2002 and did not end until January 2015. For over 13 years, Shy billed DPS $5 million with $2.7 million feeding the corruption ring. The principals and administrator received kickbacks of more than $900,000.

As of March 2016, financial matters were under the control of a Transition Manager appointed by Governor Snyder, retired bankruptcy judge Steven Rhodes. The financial crisis was ultimately resolved when the state used $617 million to create a new district for operational and administrative purposes, Detroit Public Schools Community District. The old district, Detroit Public Schools, remained as a financial entity to pay off debt. By September 2023, there were 51,000 students enrolled in the district. The district has an elected school board.

== Student achievement ==
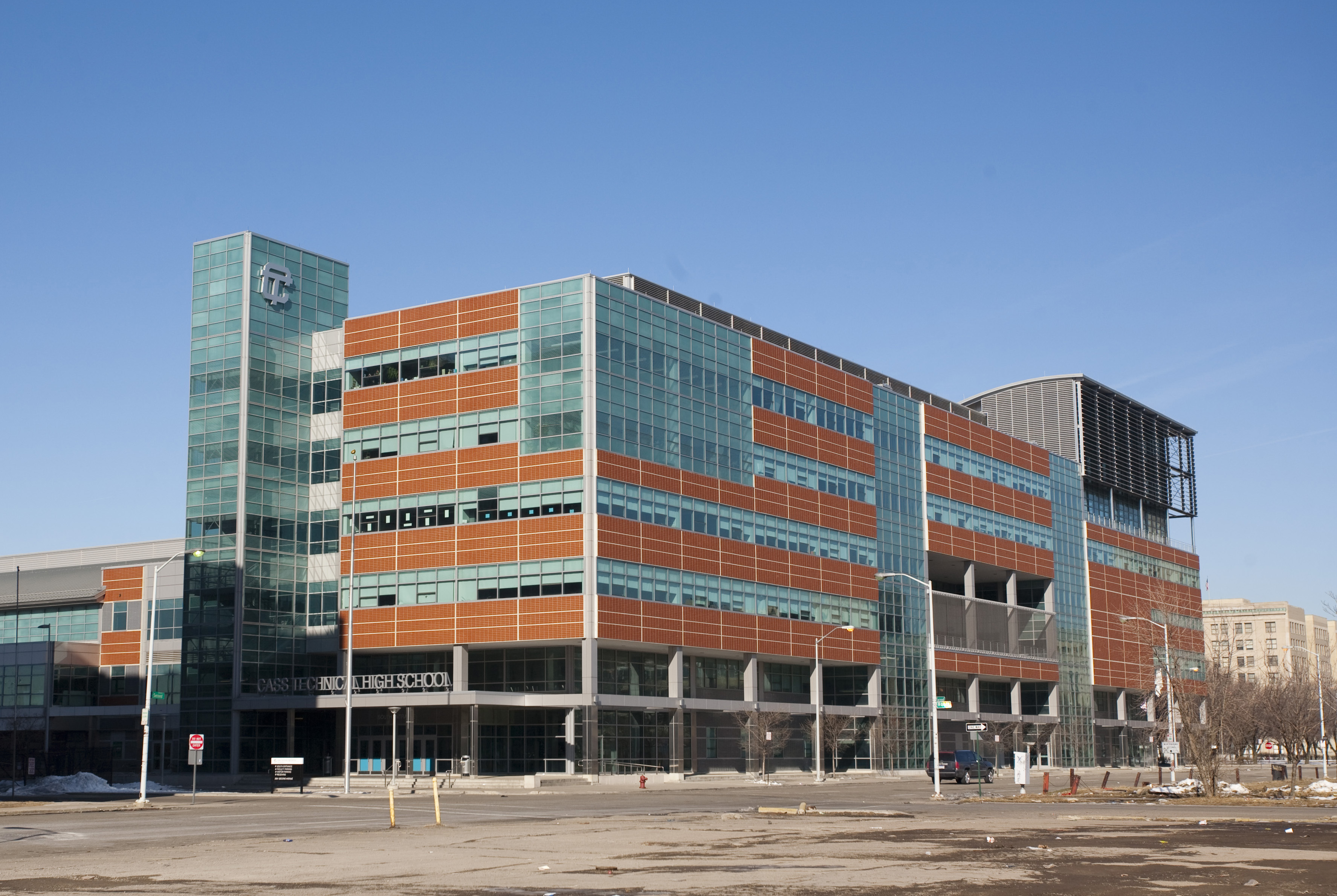
Cass Technical High School

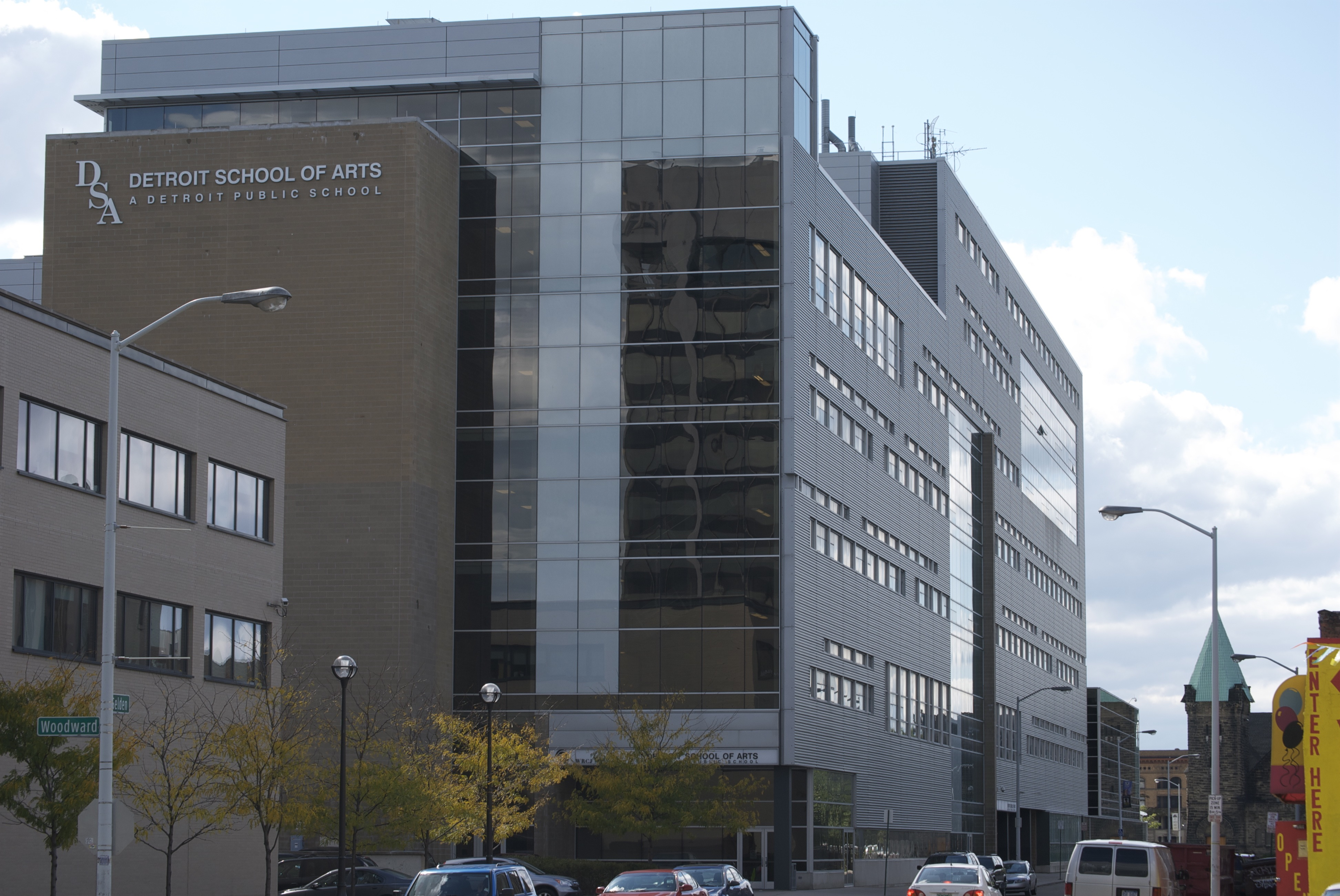
Detroit School of Arts

=== National Assessment of Education Progress (NAEP) ===
In 2007, Education Week published study that claimed that Detroit Public School's graduation rate was 24.9%. Groups including state and local officials said that the study failed to take into account high school students who leave the district for charter schools, other school districts or who move out of the area. Detroit Public Schools claim that in 2005–2006 the graduation rate was 68 percent and expected it to hold constant in 2006–2007. On February 14, 2009, the Detroit Free Press reported that United States Secretary of Education Arne Duncan had concern over the quality of education Detroit children were receiving. A spokesman later stated that Duncan had no specific plans for Detroit. The students in Detroit's public schools perennially score at the bottom compared to other large urban school systems.

Cass Technical High School, Renaissance High School, and Detroit School of Arts rank highly both statewide and nationally. However, at many schools some students still do not meet adequate yearly academic progress requirements. Students that fail to meet those requirements struggle in both language and mathematics.

A team of DPS students from Western International High School and Murray-Wright High School took second place out of 552 teams from 25 countries in a robotics competition in Atlanta, Georgia. DPS students, most notably Bates Academy students, did well at the 42nd annual Academic Olympics in Eatonton, Georgia, winning many honors. The Duffield elementary and middle school chess teams both finished first in the 2007 statewide competition, and performed well in the national competition. At a previous Annual National Academic Games Olympics, DPS students won 25 individual and 20 team first place awards.

== Leadership ==
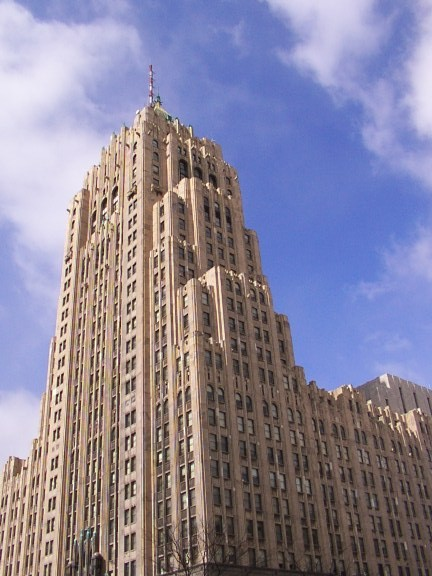
DPS is headquartered in the Fisher Building in New Center

=== Superintendent ===
Past superintendents include Warren E. Bow, Kenneth S. Burnley, Charles Ernest Chadsey, and John M. B. Sill.

The current superintendent, Nikolai Vitti, has held the position since the summer of 2017.

== Board of education ==
Member	Position
LaTrice McClendon	President
Bishop Corletta J. Vaughn, Ph.D.	Vice President
Monique Bryant	Secretary
Dr. Iris Taylor	Treasurer
Dr. Ida Carol Simmons-Short	
Bessie Harris	
Reverend Dr. Steve Bland, Jr.	

== Demographics ==
In the 1970s DPS had 270,000 students. In 2014 the 2016 projected enrollment for DPS was 40,000.

As of January 2013 about 49,900 students attend Detroit Public Schools. As of that year about 9,000 of them, over 18%, have an Individualized Education Program (IEP) plan required by the Individuals with Disabilities Education Act of the federal government. At the same time, the state average is 12%. In 2012 about 17% had IEPs.

As of 2014 DPS had 6,092 students classified as bilingual, speaking over 30 languages. They included 4,972 Spanish speakers, 522 Bengali speakers, 258 Arabic speakers, 34 Romanian speakers, 29 Hmong speakers, and 277 students speaking other languages.

In the 2019–20 school year the racial makeup was 82% black, 14% Hispanic, 3% white and 1% Asian.

== Dress code ==
Detroit Public Schools created a district-wide uniform dress code for students effective on May 11, 2006, for all students in grades Kindergarten through 12. This includes mandatory identification badges. Parents may opt their children out of the dress code for medical, religious, or financial reasons. Several schools, including Bates Academy and Malcolm X Academy, had uniform dress codes before the start of the district-wide policy.

== 2012 changes ==
=== Schools closing ===
See: List of closed public schools in Detroit

On February 9, 2012, Emergency Financial Manager Roy Roberts announced the following school closings:

1. Burton Elementary School: Students will be reassigned to the new $21.8-million Mackenzie PK-8 School building on the old Mackenzie High School site.

2. Detroit City High School: Students will be reassigned to schools with existing Second Chance programs.

3. Detroit Day School for the Deaf: Students will be reassigned to schools with hearing-impaired programs.

4. O.W. Holmes Elementary-Middle School: Students will be reassigned to the new $22.3-million Munger PK-8 School. The new facility includes a two-story student arcade that will function as a dining court, student center and school square.

5. Kettering High School & Kettering West Wing: Students at Kettering High School will be reassigned to Denby, Pershing, Southeastern or King high schools. Students enrolled at Kettering West Wing will be reassigned to schools with existing special education programs.

6. Mae C. Jemison Academy: Students will be reassigned to Gardner Elementary School or Henderson Academy.

7. Maybury Elementary School: Students will be reassigned to either Earhart Elementary-Middle School or Neinas Elementary School.

8. Parker Elementary-Middle School: Students will be reassigned to the new $21.8-million Mackenzie PreK-8 School, which will include a large open media center. The building design will focus on student safety and will be environmentally responsible.

9. Robeson Early Learning Center: Kindergarten classrooms at Robeson will be reassigned to the main Paul Robeson, Malcolm X Academy building. All pre-K programs will relocate to Palmer Park Preparatory Academy, which has a surplus Pre-K capacity.

10. Southwestern High School: Students will be reassigned to either Western International or Northwestern high schools.

=== Schools being replaced with new buildings ===
- Mumford High School: The new $50.3-million Mumford High School is the largest school construction project in the district's bond program. The 239,900-square-foot high school will accommodate about 1,500 students and also will have a community health clinic.
- Burton International: Is replaced by the Burton Theater which reopened as Cass City Cinema the end of 2011. The building also includes a montessori nursery, artist studios and law offices.

=== Schools consolidating ===
- Crockett High School and Finney High School were consolidated into a $46.5-million, 221,000-square-foot high school being constructed at the site of Finney High School. It was named East English Village Preparatory Academy and accommodates up to 1,200 students. Students in grades 10–12 from Finney and Crockett high schools attend the new school, while 9th grade are required an entrance-admissions exam. If accepted, students must maintain a GPA of 2.5.
- Farwell Elementary-Middle School and Mason Elementary School will consolidated and renamed Mason Elementary-Middle School. The current Mason Elementary School building has closed, and all students currently enrolled at Mason will be offered enrollment at the new site. New students residing in the Mason Elementary School boundary will be assigned to either the new Mason Elementary-Middle School or Nolan Elementary-Middle School.
- Langston Hughes Academy and Ludington Magnet Middle School will consolidate and be named Ludington Middle School but will use the Langston Hughes Academy building.

Ethelene Crockett Academy was named after Dr. Crockett, the wife of the late Congressman George Crockett. Beloved historic leaders in Detroit, the name was changed by the first emergency manager ( actually by Governor Snyder) to Benjamin Carson Academy.

Finney High School, named after abolitionist Jared Finney, was renamed East English Village Academy by the emergency manager.

Barbara Jordan Elementary School, named after the Black congresswoman, was renamed Palmer Park Academy.

Davis Aerospace, named after Tuskegee Airman Benjamin Davis, moved in 2013.

== See also ==
- Government of Detroit
- The Rise and Fall of an Urban School System
- "A National Disgrace"
