= Osborne High School =

Osborne High School may refer to one of several high schools in the United States:

- Osborne High School (Kansas) — Osborne, Kansas
- Osborne High School (Georgia) — Cobb County, Georgia
- Cci/Somers - Osborne School — Somers, Connecticut
- Osborn High School — Detroit, Michigan
