= Osborn High School =

Public high school in Detroit, US

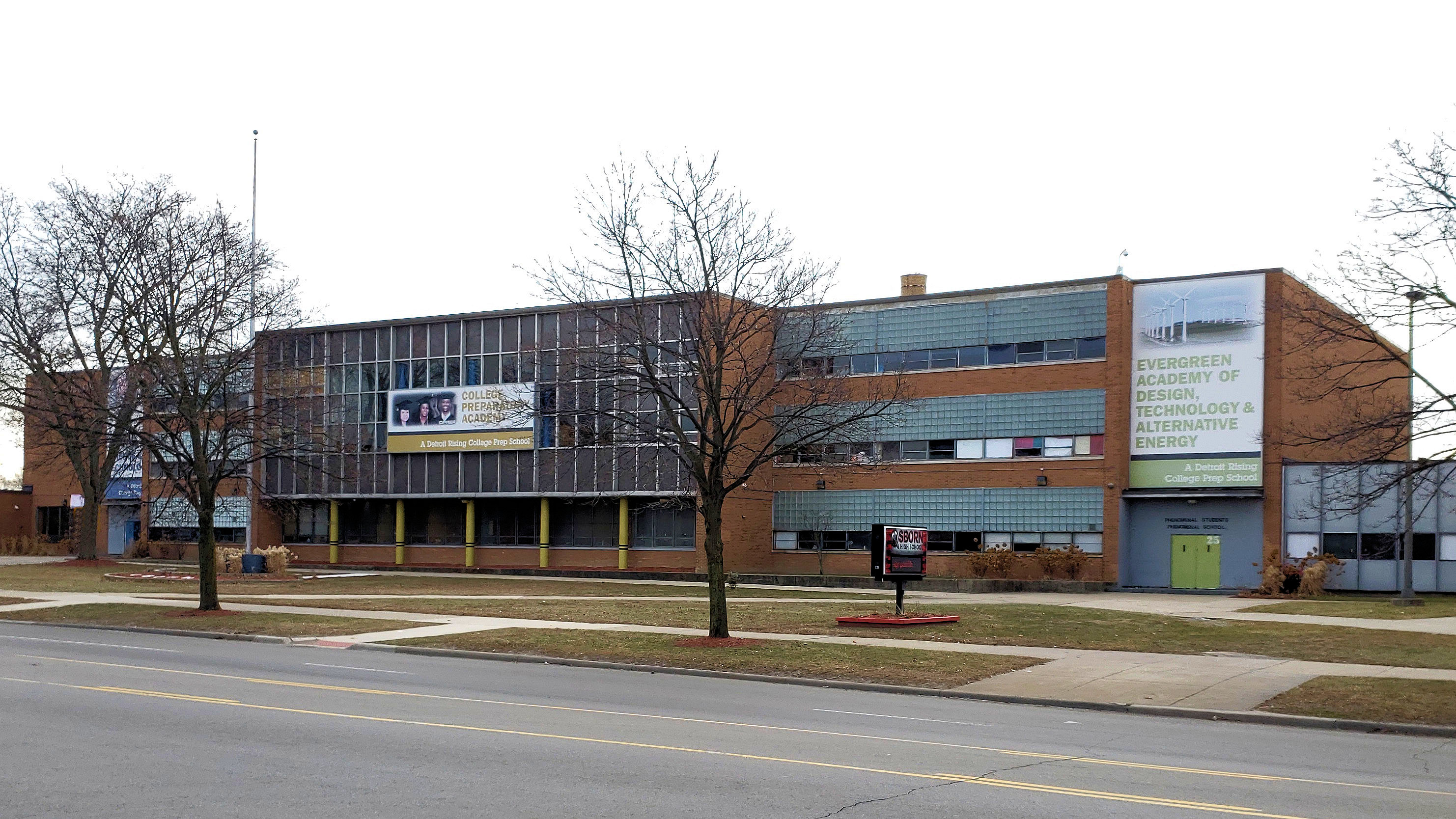

Location
- 11600 Seven Mile Rd East; Detroit, Michigan; United States
- Coordinates: 42°26.0217′N 83°0.21438′W

Information
- Type: Public high school
- Established: 1957
- School district: Detroit Public Schools Community District
- Principal: Jamita Lewis
- Staff: 26.00 (FTE)
- Grades: 9–12
- Enrollment: 439 (2023–2024)
- Student to teacher ratio: 16.88
- Colors: Red and white
- Mascot: Knights
- Website: https://osborn.detroitk12.org/

Student assessments
- 2021–22 school year Change vs. prior year

M-STEP 11th grade proficiency rates (Science / Social Studies)
- Advanced %: ≤5 / ≤5
- Proficient %: ≤5 / ≤5
- PR. Proficient %: <3 / –
- Not Proficient %: – / –

Average test scores
- SAT Total: 740.0 (▼ −29.1)

Laura F. Osborn High School, also known as Osborn Academy of Mathematics is a public high school in the Detroit Public Schools Community District (DPSCD), located in Northeast Detroit.

Currently, the school has over 20 course offerings.

In 2010 Mildred Gaddis of WCHB stated that Osborn "is considered the glue to the community."

== History ==
Laura F. Osborn High School was opened in February 1957. It was named after Laura Freele Osborn, the first female president of the Detroit Board of Education. When opened it had no auditorium, gym or pool, no facilities for vocational courses such as automotive. It took the Board of Education over four years to develop these, although the funds had been appropriated before January 1957. On the northwest side, Osborn's 'sister' school, Henry Ford had these facilities built by the end of 1959. Parents of Osborn students inquired and made visits to the Board offices and never received positive answers regarding the delay. The first student newspaper was called The Lance, the masthead designed by Gregg T. Trendowski (Class of June 1960). The teams were named the Knights, a name suggested by Gregg Trendowski (a member of the first student council and member of a special committee for name selections). Mr. Trendowski also designed the team logos and the yearbook (The Acolyte) logo in February 1957.

In 2006 Kimberly Chou of The Michigan Daily said that the school was "often criticized for its lack of resources and tension among students."

The school complex was divided into three separate schools occupying the same campus in 2009.

In 2010 Robert Bobb, the emergency financial manager of the school district, announced that Osborn was closing. In July 2010 Osborn High School was closed; it reopened in August of that year. DPS officials planned to keep the facility open for two years.

An April 2011 report from the office of Mayor of Detroit Dave Bing stated that gangs have caused problems at Osborn High.

Jeff Siedel of Detroit Free Press said that in the northern hemisphere summer of 2011 "as a wave of violence swirled around" Osborn as several students died in violent incidents. On August 24, 2011, Osborn High star football player, Allantae Powell, was murdered in western Detroit.

2012 Osborn High School was divided into four separate entities. Osborn College Preparatory Academy, Osborn Collegiate Academy of Mathematics, Science and Technology (Osborn MST), and Osborn Evergreen Academy of Design and Alternative Energy, previously occupied the campus. In 2017 all 3 small schools at Osborn were closed and merged. As of 2017 Osborn is just one high school again.

In 2016 Tanya Bowman, a former Osborn principal who engaged in a kickback scheme and took $12,500 by using false invoices, received a nine-month federal prison sentence and two years of supervised release.

== Demographics ==
As of 2006, students frequently dropped out of the school. In August 2003, the 9th grade class had 700 students. By December 2006 that class had 200 students. According to former DPS superintendent Dr. Connie Calloway, who was interviewed in the 2011 Dan Rather report "A National Disgrace," a typical class's student body declined from about 800-900 9th graders to 545 in the 10th grade, 345 in the 11th grade, and 245 in the 12th grade, with only 11 students passing the Michigan Educational Assessment Program (MEAP). As of Fall 2017 694 students are enrolled at Osborn.

A former teacher at Osborn High stated that the student body was about one third Hmong after the first wave of Hmong people moved into northeast Detroit following the Vietnam War. During 1999, 250 of the students were Hmong, and the boys' volleyball team was 95% Hmong. Stan Allen, who served as principal, said that in 1987, when he first began working at the school, the Hmong students performed academically well and often received grade point averages of 3.5 to 4.0. In the ten years until December 1999 Allen said that the academic performance of Osborn's Hmong students declined. As of 2013, about 20 to 30 Hmong students attended the Osborn High School complex. The Hmong population in the Osborn neighborhood had declined due to Hmong people moving to Warren and Sterling Heights.

Beginning in 1999 the Hmong students at Osborn began educating people about their ethnic group through a multi-cultural performance show they created, titled Asian American Awareness. A Korean American University of Michigan social work graduate student interning at the high school created a support organization to help the Hmong students.

== Location and facility ==
Osborn is located along a street that features beauty supply stores, cell phone stores, churches, and fast food restaurants.

In 2012 the school had a makeover intended to beautify the building and increase morale at the school. New carpets and new paint were installed. The remodeling used bright colors as a way of increasing morale. During the remodeling, the elevator was not functional, so football players volunteered to carry new cabinets and desks to the school's third floor. Bowman said "In years past, this building looked literally like a prison."

=== Public Safety ===
The school has had five different shooting incidents take place on its campus from 1994 to 2013.

- On February 8, 1994, 19-year-old special ed student Steven Watkins was inside of his parked car in the student parking lot when he was shot to death by an unknown assailant
- On February 2, 2001, a gunshot was fired from across the street into a window at the high school. Two students and a teacher were slightly injured by shattered glass.
- On December 2, 2002, a 15-year-old student brought a handgun to the high school and then took the gun out during class and accidentally shot himself in the leg.
- On January 13, 2006, gunshots were fired just outside the school. No one was injured.
- On January 11, 2013, a student was wounded by a shooting at the high school during a basketball game.

== Athletics ==
The school's Hall of Fame includes students who had athletic success in regional and state competitions, including Kelsey Johnson, who won the long jump event at the 1973 Michigan High School Athletic Association (MHSAA) track and field finals, and Jimalatrice Thomas who won the 400-meter dash title at the 1988 MHSAA championships. Carl Lee, 1997 Indoor MITCA 600M Runner Up, 1996 & 1997 MHSAA All State 400m Runner, 1996 & 1997 Operation Friendship Winner (400M), 1997 Detroit Public School League 400M Runner Up, 800M All Detroit Public School League

== Partners ==
Skillman, United Way of Southeastern Michigan, City-Year Corp., Wayne Mediation, Children’s Aid Society, Made Men, Neighborhood, ISA (Institute for Student Achievement), Black Family Development, Think Detroit P.A.L., Osborn College Preparatory Academy L.S.C.O., Osborn Neighborhood Alliance, and Detroit Parent Network.

== Notable alumni ==
- Gary Plummer, retired professional basketball player
- Esham, rapper
- Proof, rapper.
- Monoxide Child, rapper
