= University Prep Schools =

Detroit-area charter school system

Ronald school
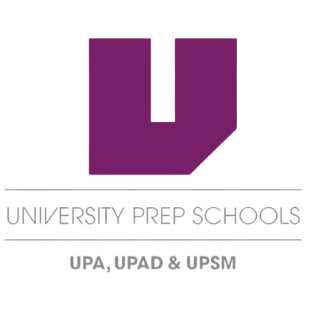

Location
- 450 Lauren street Detroit, Michigan 48207; United States; 42°22′4.4″N 83°4′31.4″W

Information
- Type: Charter school network
- Established: 2000
- Grades: K–12
- Gender: Co-Educational
- Enrollment: ~ 4,500 scholars
- Colors: Black/Red/White (U Prep Academy) Royal Blue/Black/White (U Prep Science & Math) Teal/Black/White (U Prep Art & Design)
- Athletics conference: Charter School Conference - Gold
- Sports: baseball, basketball, cheerleading, football, soccer, softball, track, volleyball, wrestling
- Nickname: Panthers (UPA) / Cobras (UPSM) / Mustangs (UPAD)
- Website: Official site

University Prep Schools (U Prep Schools) is a K-12 charter school network headquartered in the New Center area of Detroit. It has three districts within its network: University Preparatory Academy (UPA), University Prep Science & Math, (UPSM), and University Prep Art & Design (UPAD).

== History ==
The first University Preparatory Academy middle school opened its doors in Detroit in the fall of 2000 with 112 6th graders. Founded by former U.S. Assistant Secretary of Labor and Michigan State Senator Doug Ross, the school was established as a public charter school with a mission of graduating its open-admission Detroit students from high school and enrolling them in college at rates comparable to affluent suburban schools. The school modeled itself after the Big Picture schools in Rhode Island, which developed a program of individualized learning producing impressive results with urban children.

In the spring of 2002, University Prep Middle School was visited by philanthropists Robert Thompson and Ellen Thompson at the suggestion of then Michigan Governor John Engler. The Thompsons offered to help after Detroit Public Schools rejected their $200 million donation offer to create 15 new public schools. The Thompsons agreed to fund a new high school for University Prep, with a performance agreement to graduate at least 90% of the senior class in 2007 and beyond, and enroll 90% of those graduates in post-secondary studies. This "90-90" model exceeded expectations, becoming the hallmark of the University Prep system model.

As Stephen Henderson of the Detroit Free Press points out, "U Prep graduates 90 percent of its students and sends 90 percent to college. Other charters operating in the city have not had as much luck, and Ross will be tasked with making sure all DPS-chartered schools perform well."

University Prep expanded into two systems—University Preparatory Academy and University Prep Science and Math—by 2012, with two high schools, two middle schools, and three elementary schools. Ross then left to become the Chief Innovation Officer at Detroit Public Schools. A third district, developed in partnership with the College for Creative Studies, was later added to the U Prep network. The Thompson Foundation continues to support the schools.

== Academic performance ==
As part of the establishment of U Prep, The Thompsons asked the school to retain 90% of its high school students and have 90% of them attend post-secondary institutions. In 2010, the graduation rate was 95% with almost all students moving on to tertiary education. 57% of students from the class of 2007 who enrolled in two-year schools returned as sophomores, while 83% of those enrolled in four-year universities remained as sophomores.

Dan Rather stated in the 2011 program "A National Disgrace" that the test scores in the U Prep school system "are much closer to the Michigan state average" and "many points higher" compared to test scores from Detroit Public Schools (DPS) campuses.

== University Prep Academy District ==
Founded in 2000.

=== University Prep Academy Middle School ===
University Prep Academy Middle School serves approximately 405 students, the majority of whom are from Detroit.

=== University Prep Academy High School ===
University Prep Academy High School, also founded in 2000.

==== University Prep Academy Elementary (Mark Murray Campus) ====
University Prep Academy Elementary (Mark Murray) educates approximately 480 students.

== University Prep Science & Math District ==
Founded in 2008, University Prep Science & Math (UPSM) focuses on STEM education.

=== University Prep Science & Math Elementary School – Sidney D. Miller Campus ===
University Prep Science & Math Elementary School – Sidney D. Miller Campus serves as a cornerstone of the UPSM district. Founded in 2008, this K-5 school educates approximately 480 students, the majority of whom are from Detroit. The school's curriculum emphasizes STEM education.

=== University Prep Science & Math Middle School ===
University Prep Science & Math Middle School educates approximately 540 students.

The middle school, constructed with significant support from the Thompson Educational Foundation, featured two floors of classrooms and a basement with a cafeteria and gymnasium. The school included an 80,000-square-foot addition and enhancements such as a new entrance to the Detroit Science Center, a Science Center Café, and a Gift Shop.

=== University Prep Science & Math High School ===
Founded in 2010, University Prep Science & Math High School served around 1 student, the majority of whom were from Detroit.

The Thompson Foundation donated $1 million to University Prep Science & Math High School to support its mission and enhance its educational programs.

The new University Prep Science & Math High School opened on East Riverfront in 2010. Work began earlier on the renovation of the Albert Kahn-designed Franklin furniture building in the East Riverfront district to become University Prep Science & Math High School. The 94,000-square-foot facility featured state-of-the-art classrooms, a gym, a cafe with a view of the Detroit River and a wrap-around terrace, a conference room, and a spacious auditorium. The Community Foundation for Southeast Michigan awarded a grant of $1.5 million, with the Thompson Educational Foundation contributing the remaining $13.5 million needed.

== University Prep Art & Design District ==
The University Prep Art & Design (UPAD) district was founded to provide a specialized, art-infused education.

=== University Prep Art & Design Elementary School ===
UPAD Elementary is a K-5 school located in Detroit.

== See also ==
- List of public school academy districts in Michigan
