= New Center, Detroit =

Cultural enclave and neighborhoods in Wayne County, Michigan, United States

New Center, Detroit, Michigan
- Cultural enclave and neighborhoods
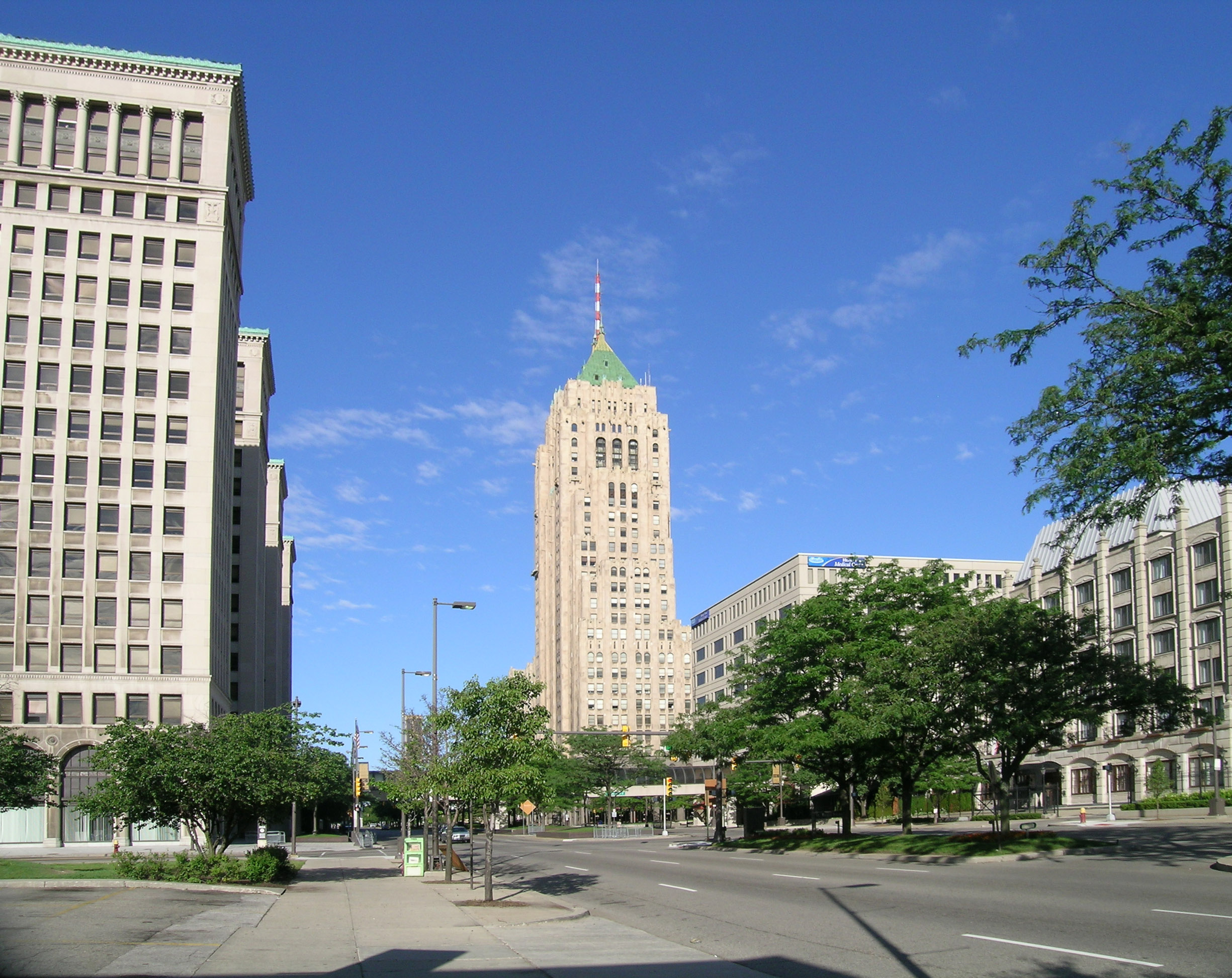
- Grand Boulevard looking west through New Center. The National Historic Landmarks Cadillac Place (left) and the Fisher Building in the background, with the Hotel St. Regis on the right
- Interactive map of New Center, Detroit, Michigan
- Country: United States
- State: Michigan
- County: Wayne
- City: Detroit
- Time zone: UTC-5 (Eastern Standard Time (North America))
  - Summer (DST): UTC-4 (Eastern Daylight Time (North America))

New Center is a commercial and residential district located in Detroit, Michigan, adjacent to Midtown, one mile (1.6 km) north of the Cultural Center, and approximately three miles (5 km) north of Downtown. The area is centered just west of the intersection of Woodward Avenue and Grand Boulevard, and is bounded by the Virginia Park Historic District on the north and the Edsel Ford Freeway (I-94) on the south, John R Street on the east and the Lodge Freeway on the west. New Center, and the surrounding areas north of I-94, are sometimes seen as coterminous with the North End, but, in fact, are separate districts.

The heart of New Center was developed in the 1920s as a business hub that would offer convenient access to both downtown resources and outlying factories. Some historians believe that New Center may be the original edge city—a sub-center remote from, but related to, a main urban core. The descriptor "New Center" derived its name from the New Center News, an automotive-focused free newspaper begun in 1933 that continues to operate under the name Detroit Auto Scene. From 1923 to 1996, General Motors maintained its world headquarters in New Center (in what is now Cadillac Place) before relocating downtown to the Renaissance Center; before becoming a division of GM, Fisher Body was headquartered in the Fisher Building. Both Cadillac Place and the Fisher Building are National Historic Landmarks. In addition to the government and commercial offices along Woodward and Grand Boulevard, New Center contains the Fisher Theatre, the Hotel St. Regis, the Henry Ford Hospital, restaurants, and residential areas.

== History ==
In 1891, Detroit mayor Hazen S. Pingree broke ground on the construction of Grand Boulevard, a ring road that wrapped around the city of Detroit. The Boulevard ran for 12 miles (19 km), curving from the Detroit River on the west to the river on the east and crossing Woodward Avenue at a point approximately 3 miles (4.8 km) from downtown. The Boulevard was originally thought to represent the absolute limit of the city's expansion, although tremendous growth at the beginning of the 20th century quickly pushed the city limits far beyond Grand Boulevard.

In the 1890s, major railroad infrastructure known as the Milwaukee Junction was built just south of Grand Boulevard to facilitate industrial expansion in the city of Detroit. To take advantage of the rail line, industrial plants were built in this area on both sides of Woodward Avenue, with the automotive industry prominently involved. Part of this area east of Woodward is now the Piquette Avenue Industrial Historic District, while the area west of Woodward and south of the railroad tracks is the New Amsterdam Historic District. Most notably, in 1904, Burroughs Adding Machine Company built a large factory on Third, and the following year Cadillac built an assembly plant just to the east of Burroughs.

In 1915, Henry Ford bought the financially struggling Detroit General Hospital and its lands on Grand Boulevard and Hamilton (just west of Woodward) and reopened it as Henry Ford Hospital with 48 beds. Soon after, Ford broke ground on a 50,000-square-foot (4,600 m^{2}) facility at the same location; the larger hospital opened in 1921.

== Architecture ==
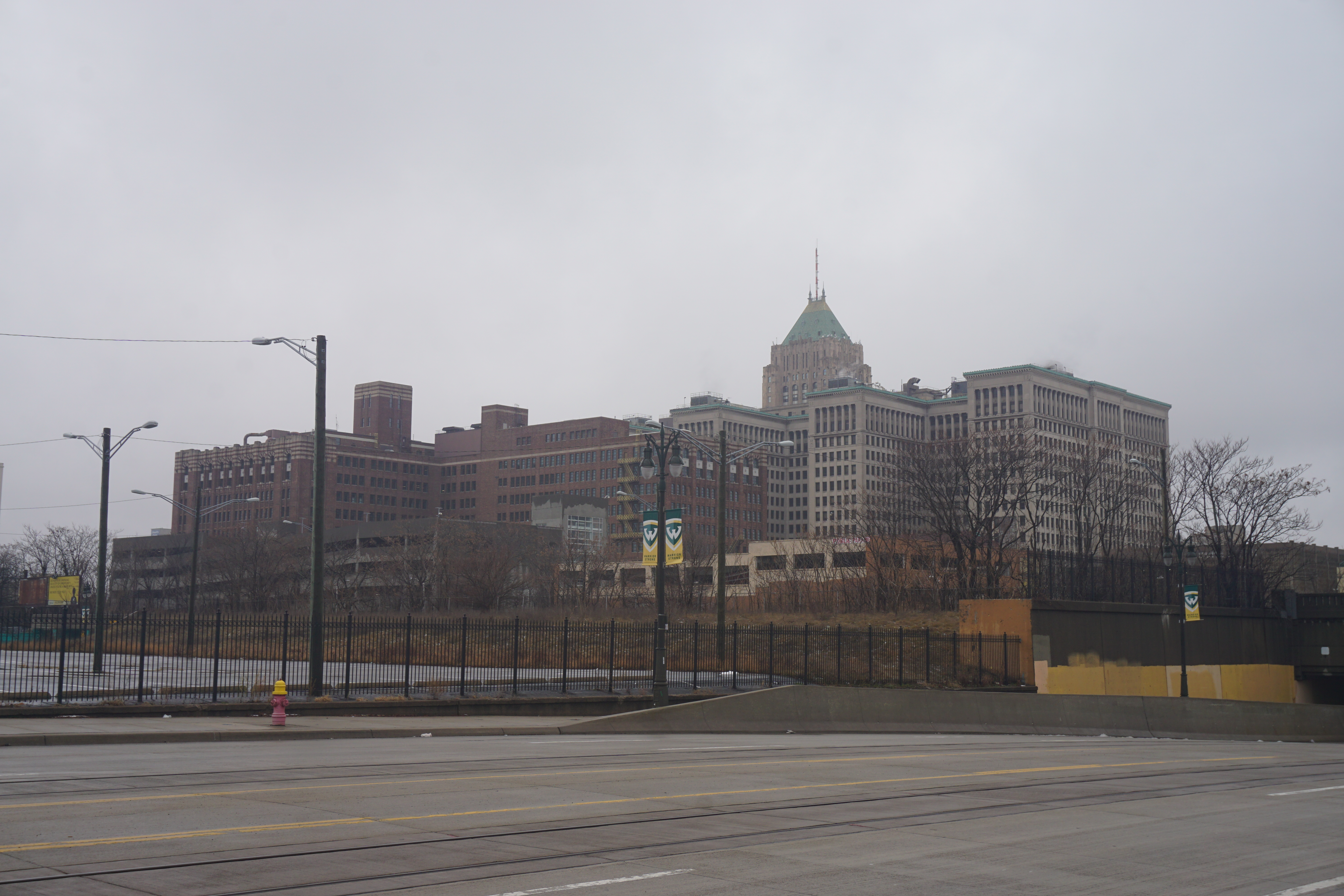
Skyline of New Center

In the late 1910s and early 1920s, the automobile industry in Detroit grew rapidly. The economic surge made land in downtown Detroit difficult to obtain. The lack of suitable parcels frustrated William C. Durant in his search for the optimum location for his planned General Motors headquarters. Durant looked to the north, and settled on a location just west of Woodward Avenue on Grand Boulevard. At the time, the area was a residential district of private homes and small apartment buildings.

Durant hired Albert Kahn to design his building, and ground was broken in 1919. The building was originally to be called the "Durant Building", but Durant left the company before the building was completed, so when it opened in 1922, the building was called the "General Motors Building" (now the Cadillac Place). As General Motors continued to grow, the company required more space. In the later 1920s, they built a second building, the General Motors Research Laboratory (also known as the Argonaut Building), also designed by Kahn, directly south of their headquarters. The building was built in two phases, and was completed in 1930.

Around the same time, the Fisher Brothers of Fisher Body followed General Motors to the area. They broke ground on their eponymous Fisher Building in 1927, located across Grand Boulevard from the General Motors Building. The Fisher Brothers also hired Kahn, and spared no expense to construct their headquarters building. They followed this up with the construction of New Center Building (now the Albert Kahn Building), completed in 1932. The Great Depression, however, forced the Fishers to break off their plans to construct a complex of buildings in New Center, including a grandiose three-towered version of the Fisher building. In 1940 Saks Fifth Avenue opened their fourth full-line department store in this building. The store closed in 1978 and relocated to Fairlane Town Center in Dearborn.

Henry Ford Hospital has continued to expand. The hospital has built numerous additions to their campus since its inception by Henry Ford, from the Clara Ford Nursing Home in 1925 to their high-rise clinic in 1955 to hospital apartments in 1976. In 1992, Henry Ford purchased the old Burroughs headquarters to the south and renamed it One Ford Place. The building is now the Henry Ford Hospital corporate headquarters.

In 1966, the Hotel St. Regis was built on the north side of Grand Boulevard near General Motors' headquarters. In 1988, the hotel was doubled in size. In 1980, General Motors built another addition to the heart of New Center, New Center One, located across Grand Boulevard from their headquarters. The new eight-story building housed retail stores, offices, and some divisions of General Motors.

In 1977, General Motors began refurbishing some of the residential neighborhoods north of Grand Boulevard. The result was the "New Center Commons", a collection of refurbished single-family homes on the north side of New Center. With the revitalization of Virginia Park, New Center has two distinct historic residential neighborhoods within its boundaries. General Motors also facilitated the rehabilitation of some multi-family dwellings. In the late 1990s and early 2000s, new townhomes and condominiums were constructed in what had been empty areas of New Center, including a section along Woodward just north of Grand Boulevard. Additional loft renovation (as well as TechTown, the WSU research and business incubator hub) took place at the same time within the New Amsterdam Historic District.

== Economy ==
New Center served as a kind of corporate campus for GM for 70 years. However, the company left the area in the 1990s, moving their headquarters to the Renaissance Center downtown. The old General Motors Building—now called Cadillac Place—is owned and occupied by the State of Michigan.

The economy of the New Center area is largely dominated by Henry Ford Health, the Detroit Public Schools system with their headquarters in the Fisher Building, and more than 2,000 State of Michigan employees in the high-rise office complex Cadillac Place.

Shinola has its headquarters, and 30,000-square-feet in the College for Creative Studies, – CCS – (originally the Argonaut building, or General Motors Research Laboratory). In 2012, Shinola renovated the fifth floor and turned it into their corporate office as well as a watch factory and bicycle workshop. In 2014, Shinola gifted the city of Detroit with four new 13-foot tall street clocks, installed at Cobo Center, Eastern Market, in front of the College for Creative Studies at the corner of Cass and Milwaukee, and near Shinola's own first retail location, at the corner of Cass and Canfield.

Midtown Detroit, Inc., has become a driving force behind the planning, investment, and future development north of Detroit's downtown area, and has expanded those area boundaries, and of the New Center area by going north to Philadelphia Street, east to the Chrysler Freeway (I-75), south to the Edsel Ford Freeway (I-94), and west to Rosa Parks Boulevard.

== Districts ==
Name	Image	Location	Summary
Arden Park-East Boston Historic District		Arden Park and East Boston Avenues between Woodward and Oakland Avenues; 42°23′19″N 83°4′49″W	The Arden Park-East Boston Historic District was platted in the 1890s east of Woodward in what was then the far northern reaches of Detroit. The neighborhood was platted with large lots which feature richly planted trees and flowers, and attracts wealthier residents; some of the neighborhood's first residents included Frederick Fisher, John Dodge, and J.L. Hudson. The neighborhood, along with nearby Boston-Edison (also on the register), remained a premier address for residential living in Detroit with about 92 large homes and mansions.
Atkinson Avenue Historic District		Atkinson Avenue between the John C. Lodge Freeway (M-10) and Linwood Avenue	South of Boston-Edison, it contains approximately 225 homes built from 1915 to 1925.
Boston-Edison Historic District		Roughly bounded by Edison Street, Woodward and Linwood Avenues and Glynn Court; 42°22′54″N 83°5′50″W	The Boston-Edison Historic District is a historic neighborhood consisting of over 900 homes, primarily built from 1905 to 1925 which makes it the largest residential historic district in the nation. Historically significant residents include Henry Ford, James J. Couzens, Horace Rackham, Charles T. Fisher, Peter E. Martin, C. Harold Wills, Clarence W. Avery, Sebastian S. Kresge, and Clarence Burton. It is one of the largest residential historic district in the nation.
New Amsterdam Historic District		435, 450 Amsterdam;440, 41-47 Burroughs; 5911–5919, 6050-6160 Cass; 6100-6200 Second; 425 York; 42°21′56″N 83°4′21″W	The New Amsterdam Historic District contains a mix of industrial, commercial, and government/utility buildings constructed primarily near the turn of the century. Industry in the district was enabled by the construction of major railroad infrastructure, known as the Milwaukee Junction, in the 1890s. The district includes the original Cadillac assembly plant.
New Center		7430 Second Avenue and 3011 West Grand Boulevard; 42°22′11″N 83°4′39″W	Cadillac Place and the Fisher Building are National Historic Landmarks in the New Center area. The significant complex demonstrates some of the finest craftsmanship and artistry in Art Deco style buildings. Both were funded by the Fisher brothers (of Fisher Body) and designed by Albert Kahn. New Center is a vibrant residential community. The Hotel St. Regis in 2016 will be another Historic Landmark in the New Center Area.
Piquette Avenue Industrial Historic District	Piquette Avenue looking east from Woodward. Fisher Body Plant 23 and the Ford Piquette Avenue plant are on the left; Fisher Body Plant 21 is on the right.	Roughly bounded by Woodward, Harper, Hastings and the Grand Trunk Western Railroad Line; 42°22′5″N 83°3′57″W	The area along Piquette was an important center for automobile production in the early 20th century. Ford Motor Company, Studebaker, Cadillac, Dodge, and Regal Motor Car had plants in the area, as well as suppliers such as Fisher Body. In 1910, the two largest automobile producers in the world, Studebaker and Ford, were located next door to each other on Piquette. The district includes the National Historic Landmark Ford Piquette Avenue Plant.
Virginia Park Historic District		Both sides of Virginia Park From Woodward Avenue to service drive for John Lodge Freeway (M-10); 42°22′29″N 83°4′54″W	In 1893, Virginia Park was platted with 92 relatively small lots. Requirements ensured that only well-to-do businessmen and professionals could afford to erect a home in the neighborhood. Most of the homes were built between 1893 and 1915, in Tudor, Neo-Georgian, Bungalow and Arts and Crafts architectural styles.

=== Structures ===
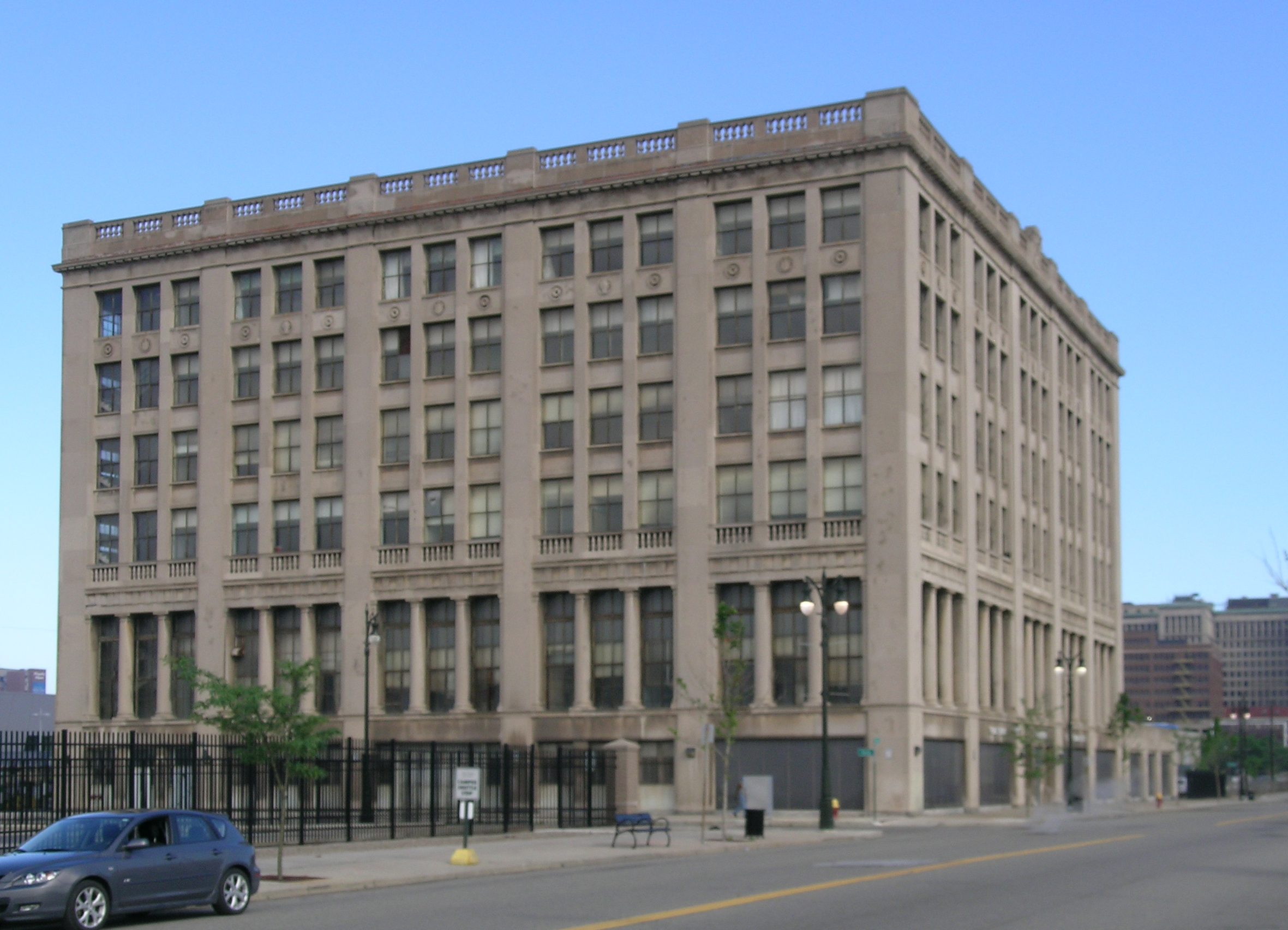
Historic 6001 Cass Avenue building, houses new offices, and a 6,000-square-foot gallery for WSU’s art collection, after $40M renovation.

- Albert Kahn Building (200 unit residential building)
- Argonaut Building (College for Creative Studies)
- Cadillac Place (GM Building / state office complex)
- Detroit Amtrak station (Adjacent to QLine Baltimore Street station)
- Fisher Building
- Henry Ford Health System
- Henry Ford Hospital
- Hitsville U.S.A.
- Hotel St. Regis, Detroit
- Metropolitan United Methodist Church
- New Center One (Henry Ford Medical Center)
- New Center Park

== Gallery ==
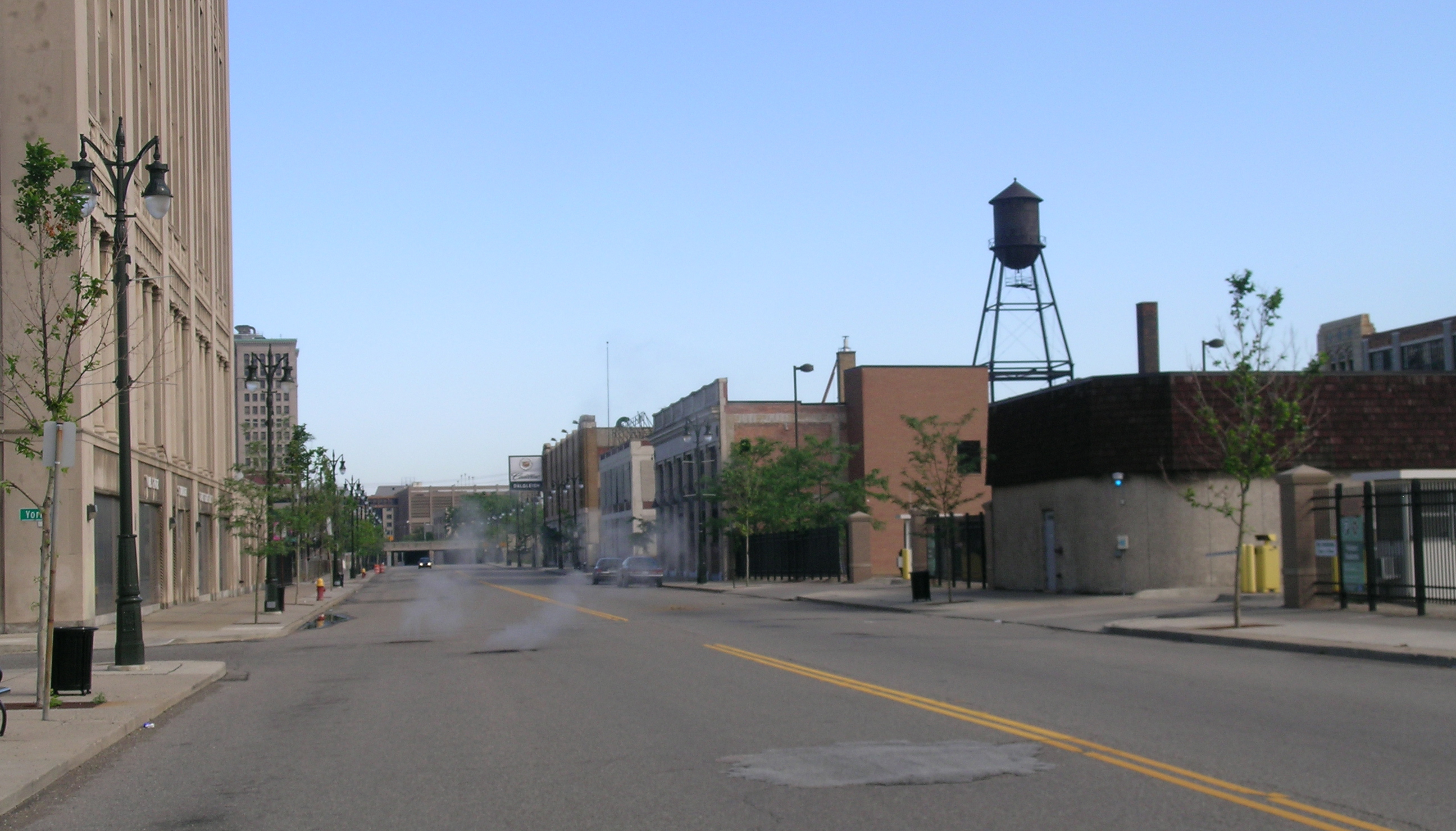
Streetscape on Cass, looking north, in the New Amsterdam Historic District

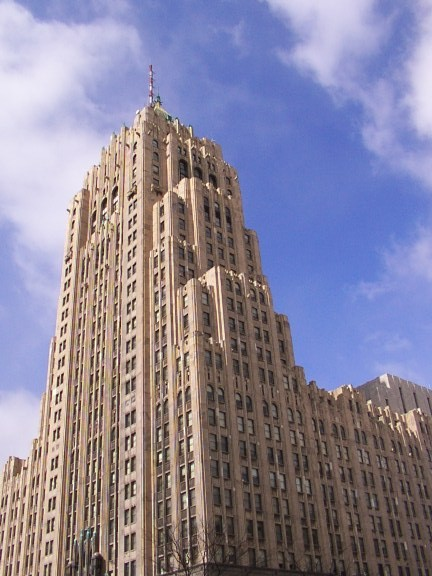
The Fisher Building, which has the headquarters of Detroit Public Schools

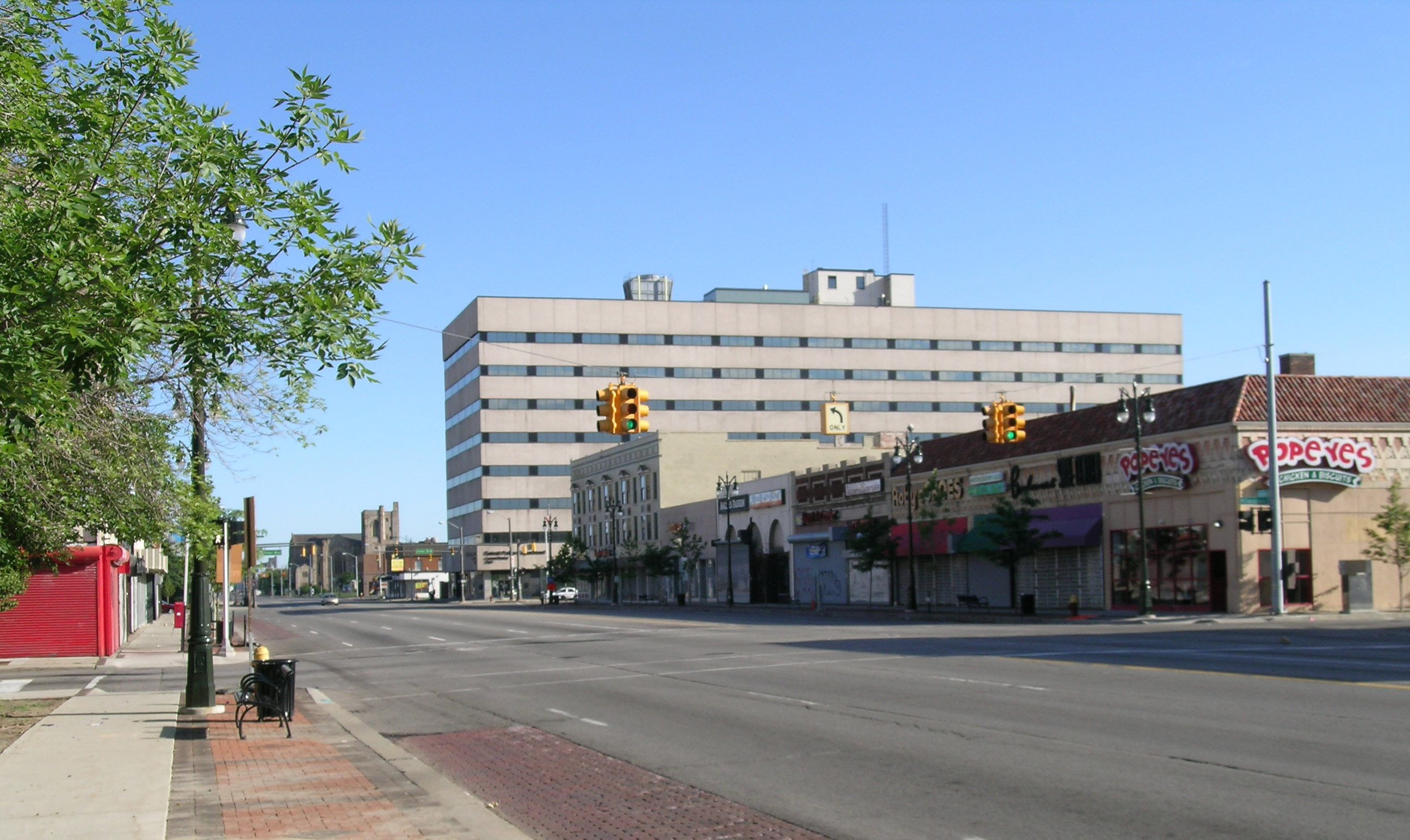
Woodward Avenue looking north just past Grand Boulevard at the
Lakeshore Global Building

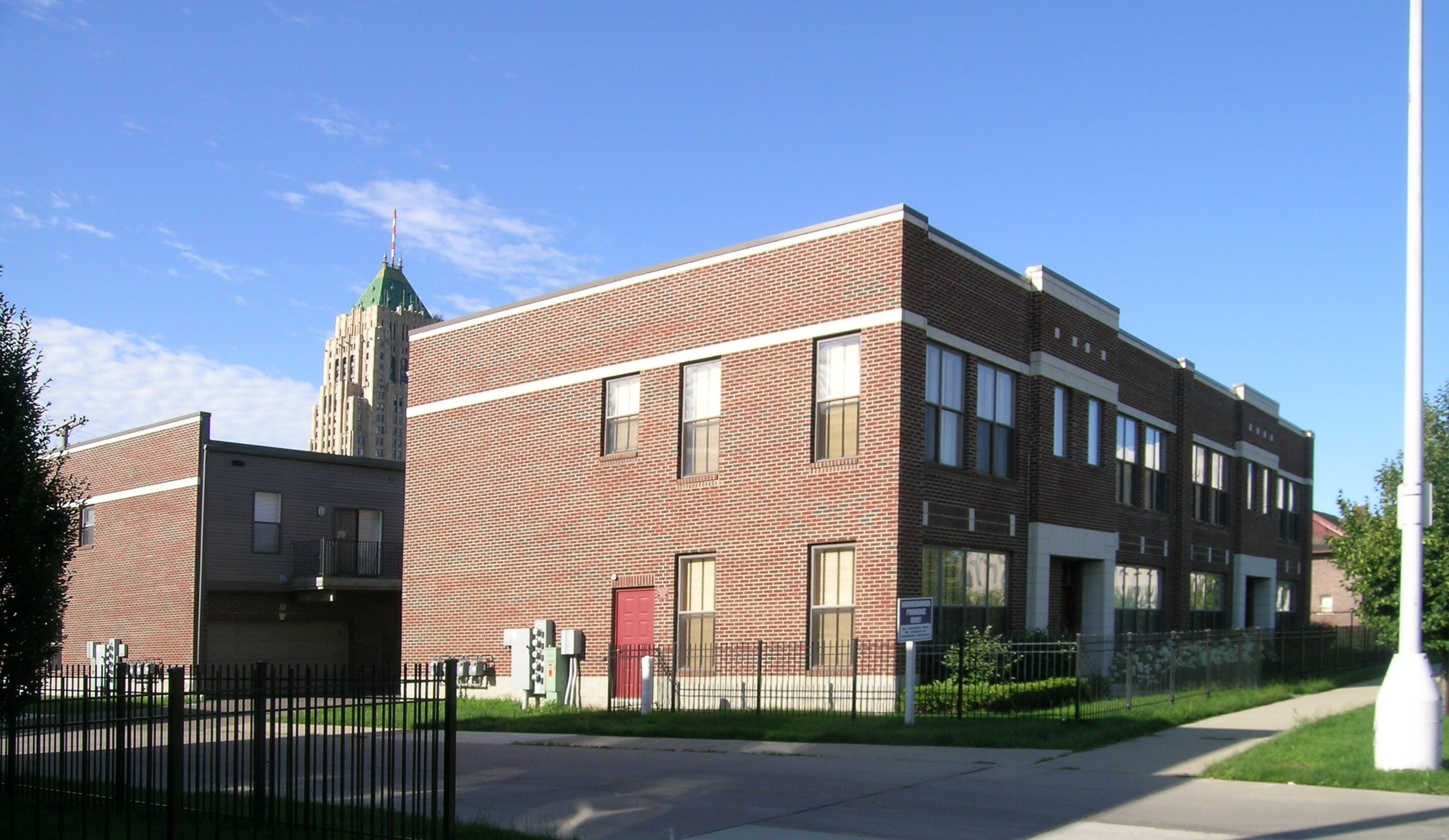
New Center townhomes on Pallister

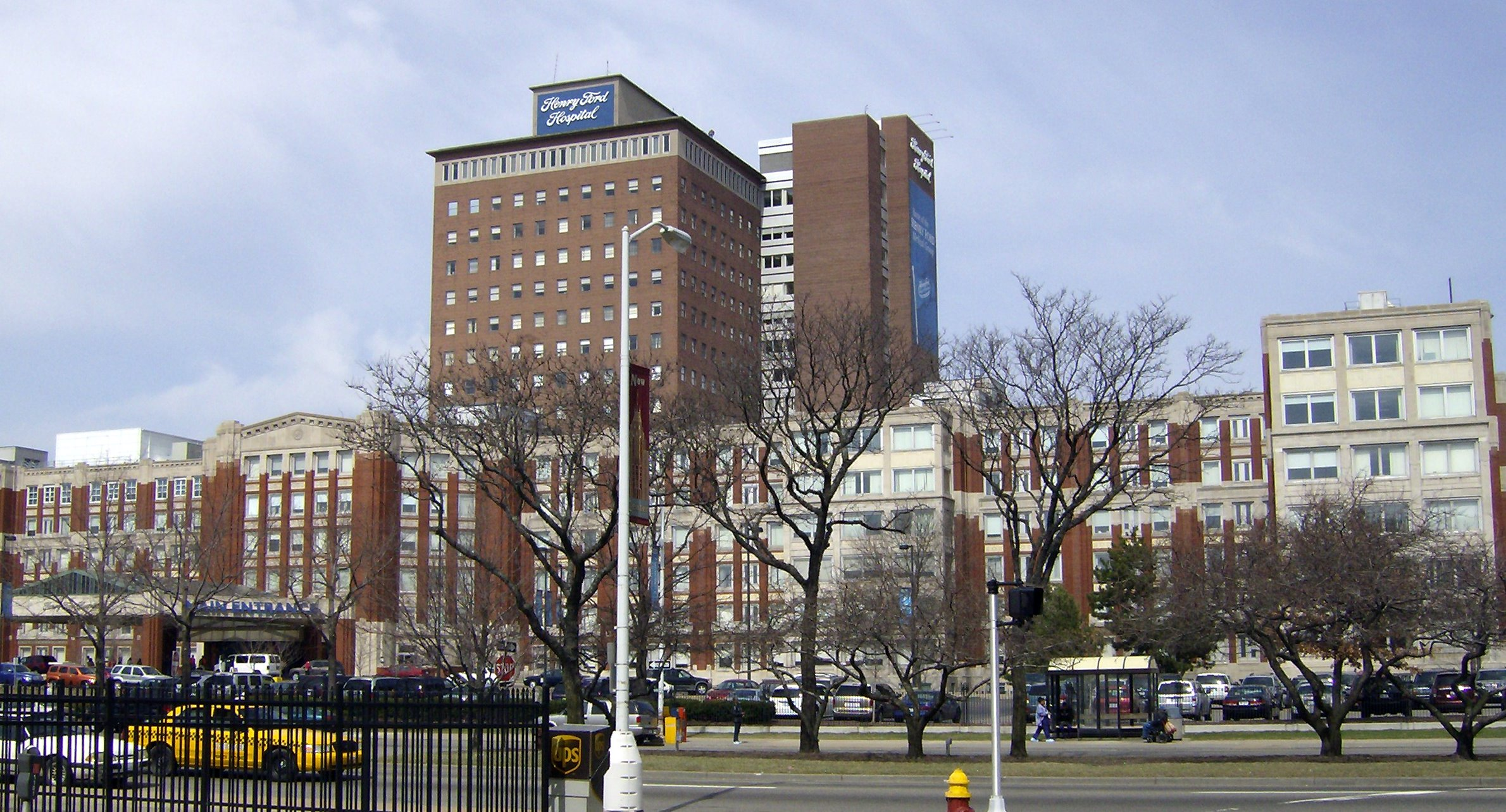
Henry Ford Hospital

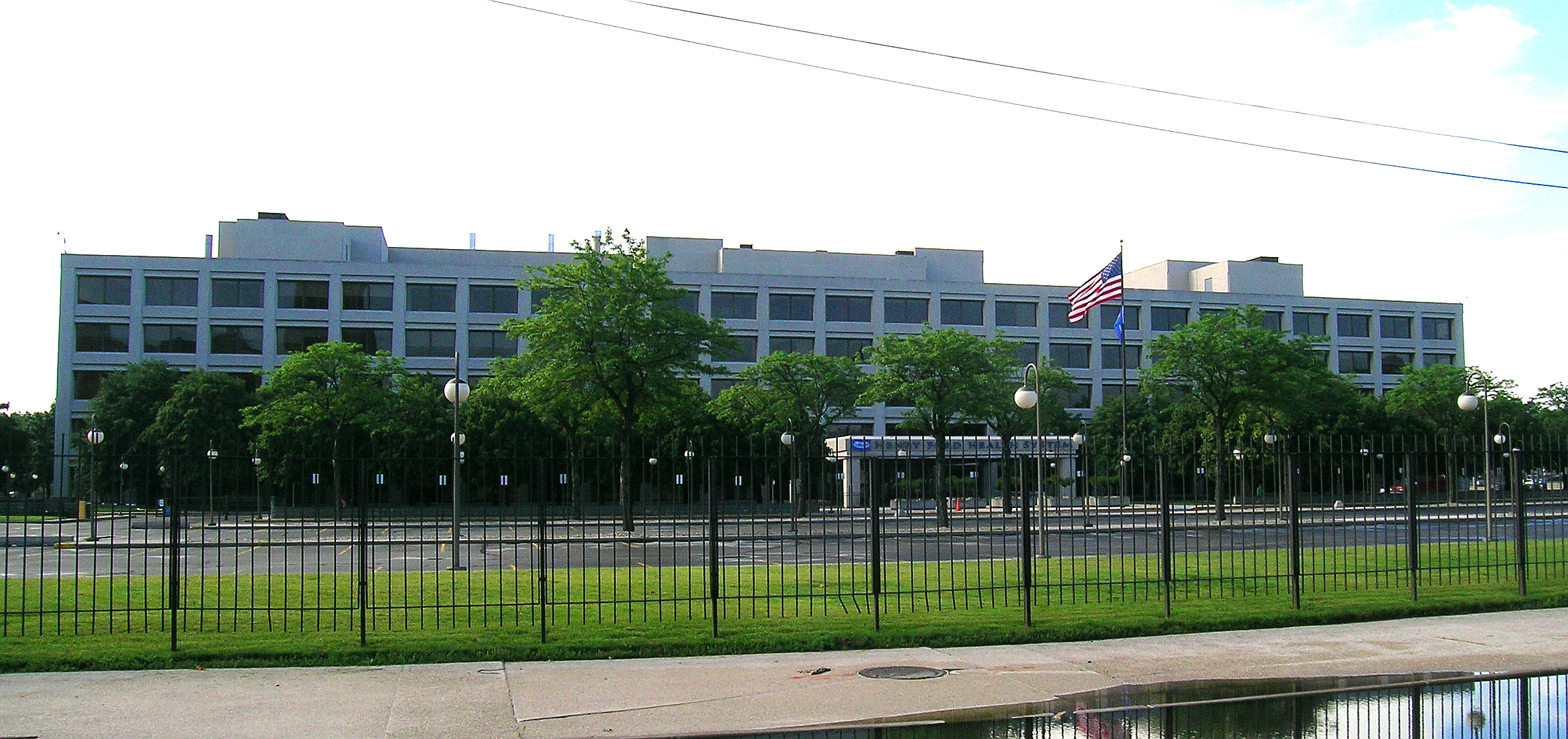
The Henry Ford Health System
Headquarters Complex in New Center

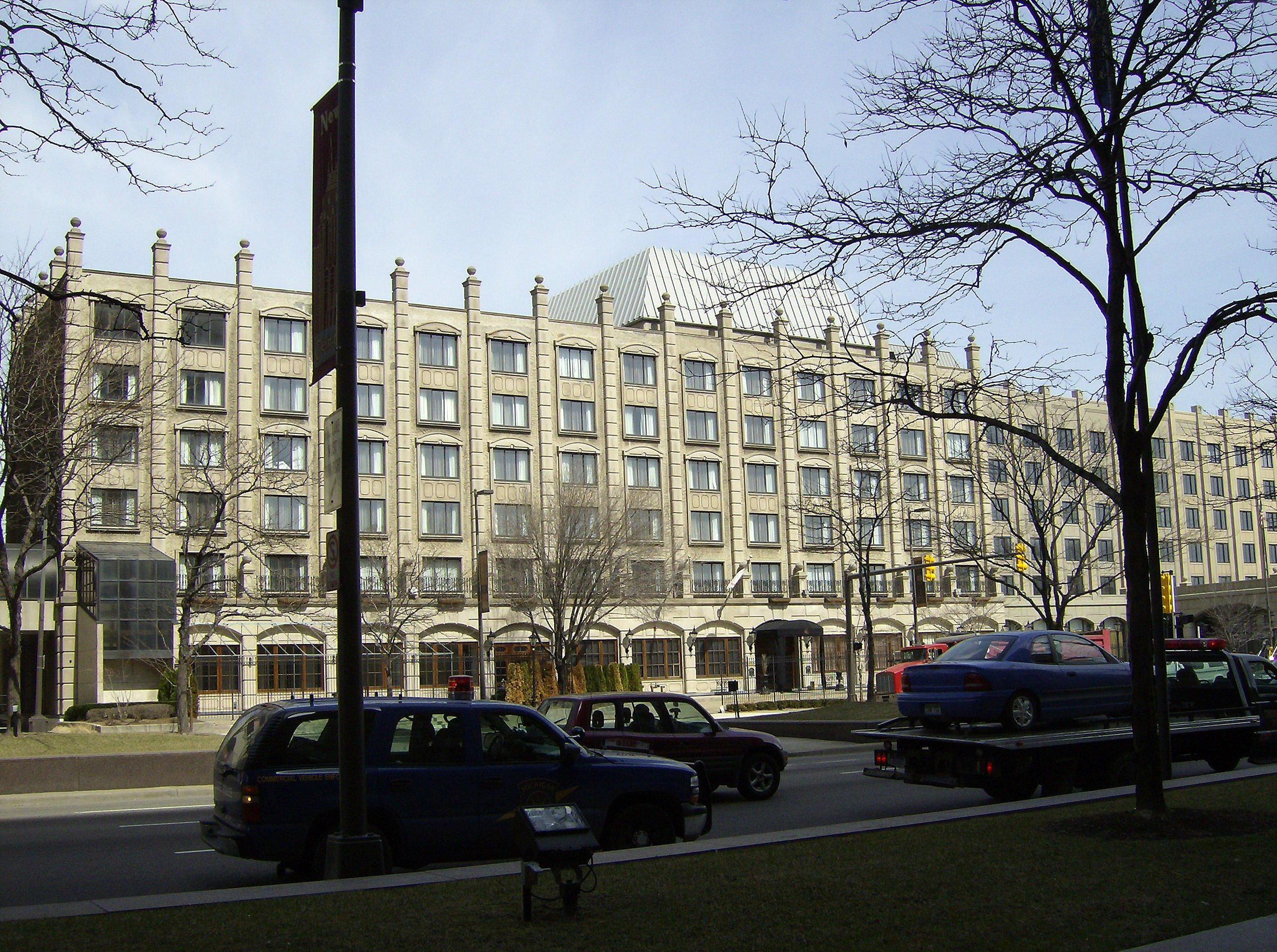
Hotel St. Regis, Detroit

General Motors Building
(now Cadillac Place)

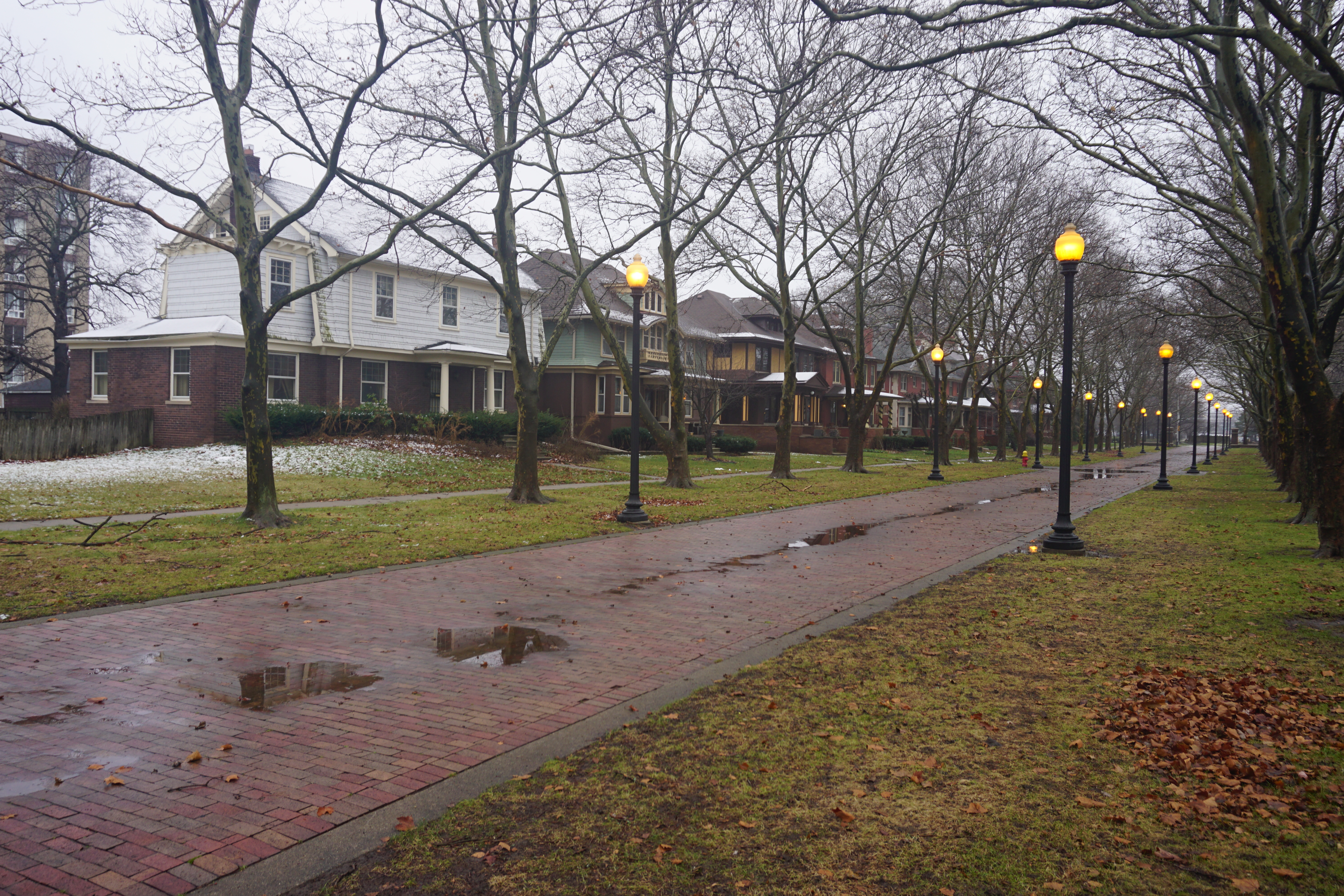
Homes on Pallister, a pedestrian only street in this block.

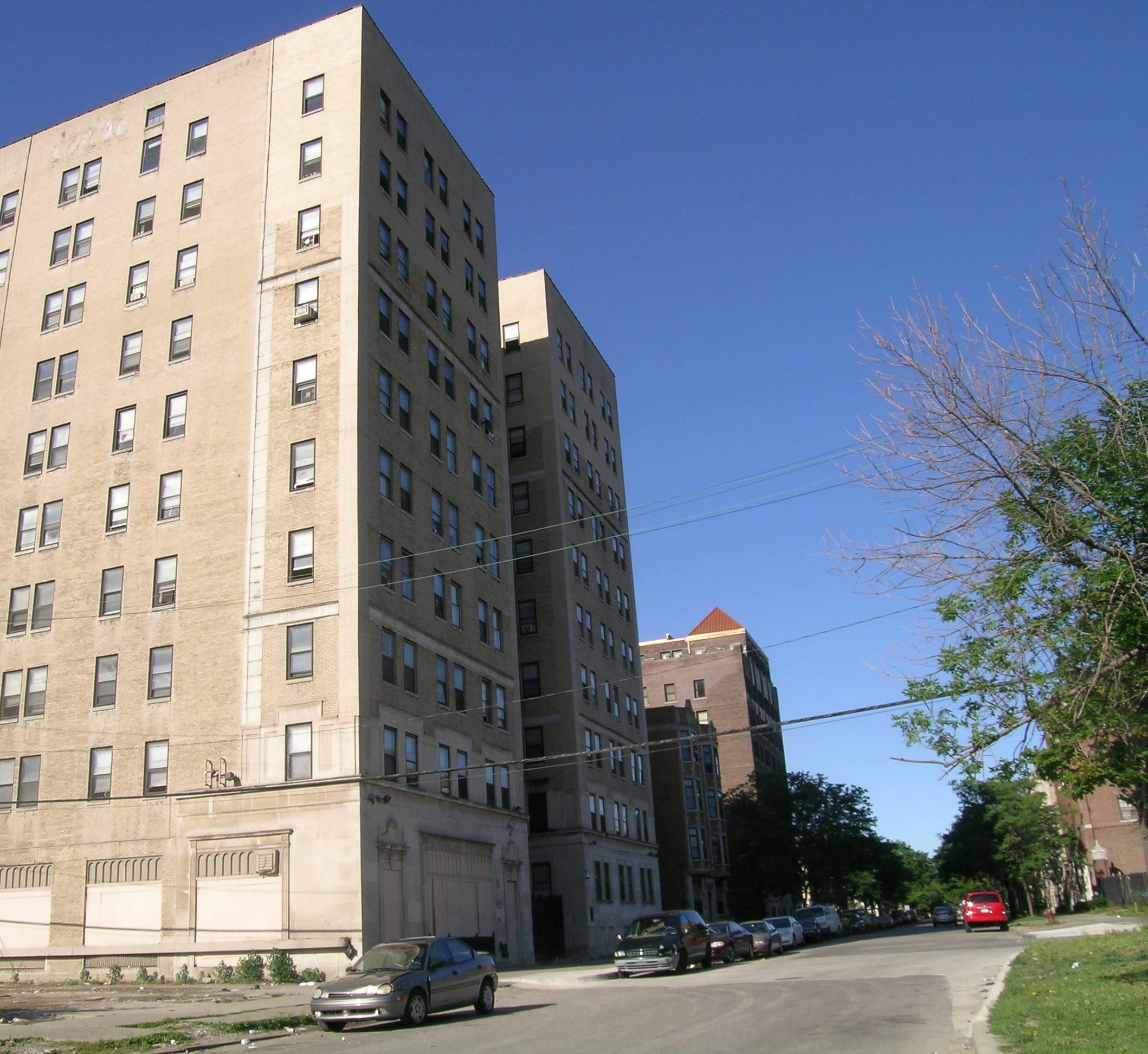
Apartment building (Wellington Place) at 59 Seward Avenue on the north side of New Center under renovation in 2017 for 91 senior apartments.

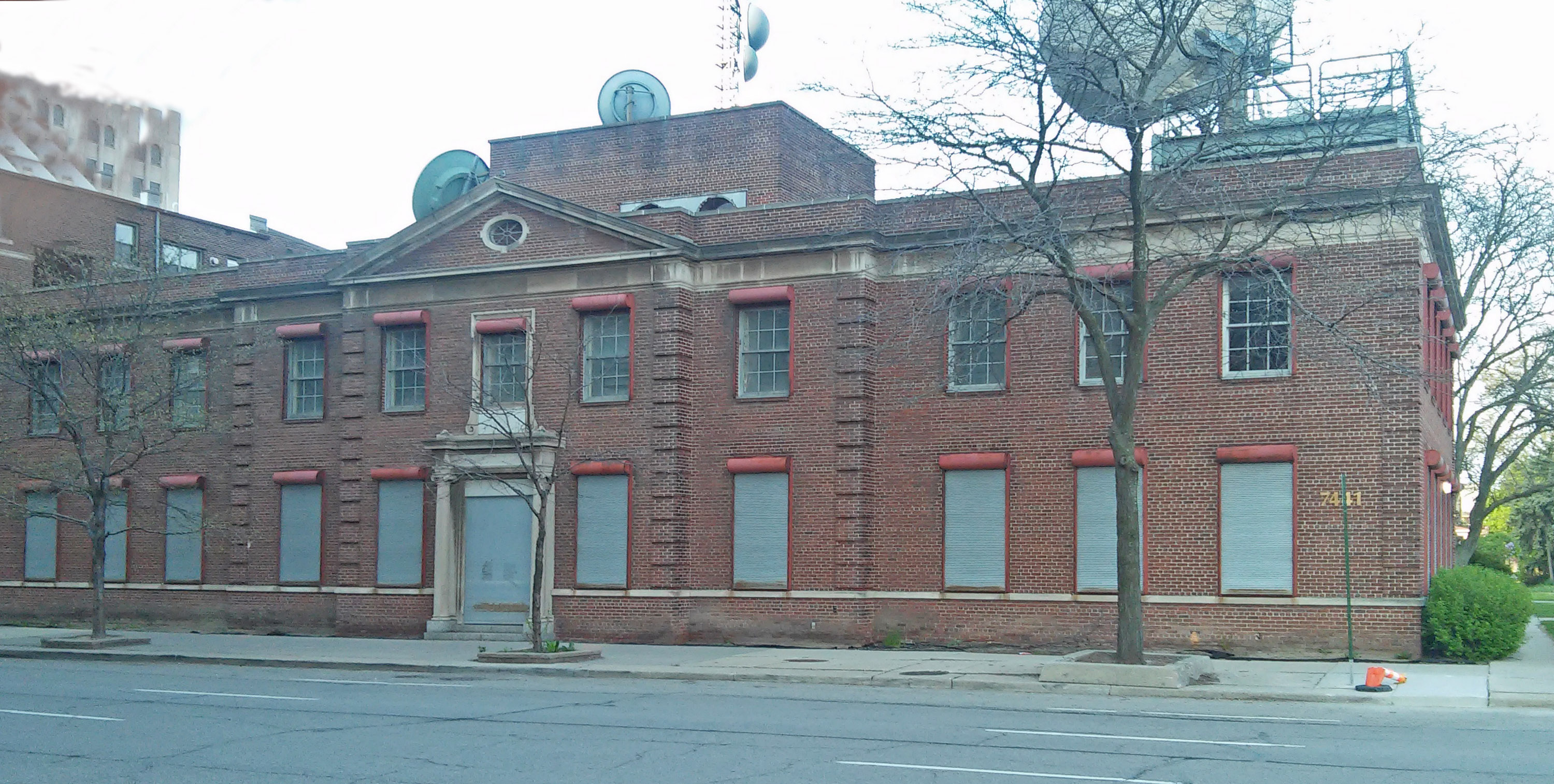
The former WJBK-TV Studios Building (on the National Register of Historic Places) sold to developers in late 2019.

== Culture and contemporary life ==
New Center has a retail section, primarily along the Woodward and Grand Boulevard corridors. The Cadillac Place state office complex and the Fisher Building are National Historic Landmarks in the area. An area south of Grand Boulevard along Woodward contains some retail stores in the district which have existed at their present location since the 1920s. The boutique Hotel St. Regis, Detroit is adjacent to the Fisher Theatre.

The Consulate-General of Lebanon in Detroit is located in Suite 560 in the New Center One Building.

New Center hosts the annual summer-long series of events in New Center Park and includes a 1,000 person outdoor concert venue with a center stage capable of hosting national acts.

Grand Boulevard, along its entire extent, became an attractive residential address at the beginning of the 20th century. This was also true in the area that was to become New Center. At the turn of the century, a number of private homes were built along Grand Boulevard and in the neighborhoods to the north, notably including what is now the Virginia Park Historic District on the northern edge of New Center. Interspersed in the area were small apartment buildings. Larger apartment buildings were constructed in the area in the 1920s to serve the population of workers and visitors to the area after larger office buildings had been built on Grand Boulevard.

=== Revitalization ===
The 2010s have seen a growth of new development in the New Center area. One of the first major projects, begun in 2010, was by the Henry Ford Health System of a $500 million revitalization effort of 300 mostly blighted acres for hospital expansion and neighborhood redevelopment just south of the main hospital campus on the western edge of New Center. The first development on the new South Campus site was the construction of a $30 million, 275,000-square-foot, Medical Distribution Center on 18-acres, built for Cardinal Health, Inc. Further plans were announced in 2017, with the construction of a new $155 million, 187,000-square-foot, six-story, Brigitte Harris Cancer Pavilion, along with a skywalk across West Grand Boulevard to connect it to the Henry Ford Hospital, opened in January 2021.
In February 2023, Henry Ford Health announced plans for a major $2.5 billion development, and will partner with the Detroit Pistons and Michigan State University.

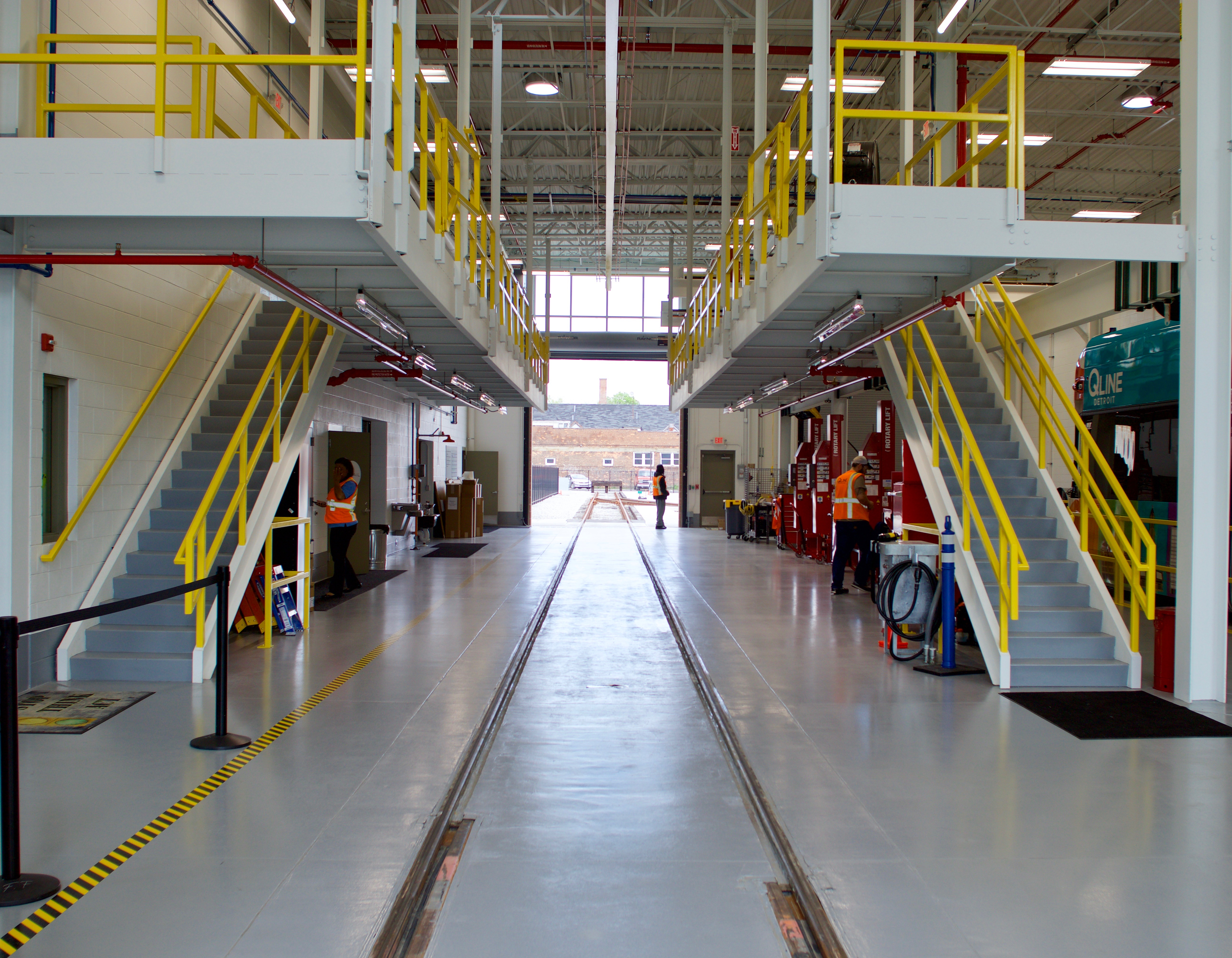
Streetcar maintenance bay, inside Penske Tech Center

Additional new construction in New Center includes Wayne State University's, $92 million Integrative Biosciences Center (IBio), the 2015 M-1 Rail Penske Tech Center, the $60 million, 231 apartment & retail space complex, The Boulevard, the $137 million Detroit Pistons practice, training, and team headquarters building, known as the, Henry Ford-Detroit Pistons Performance Center, and the WSU Computing & Information Technology (C&IT) new Data center attached to the current Computing Services Center, along with a new Pocket park along Cass Avenue.

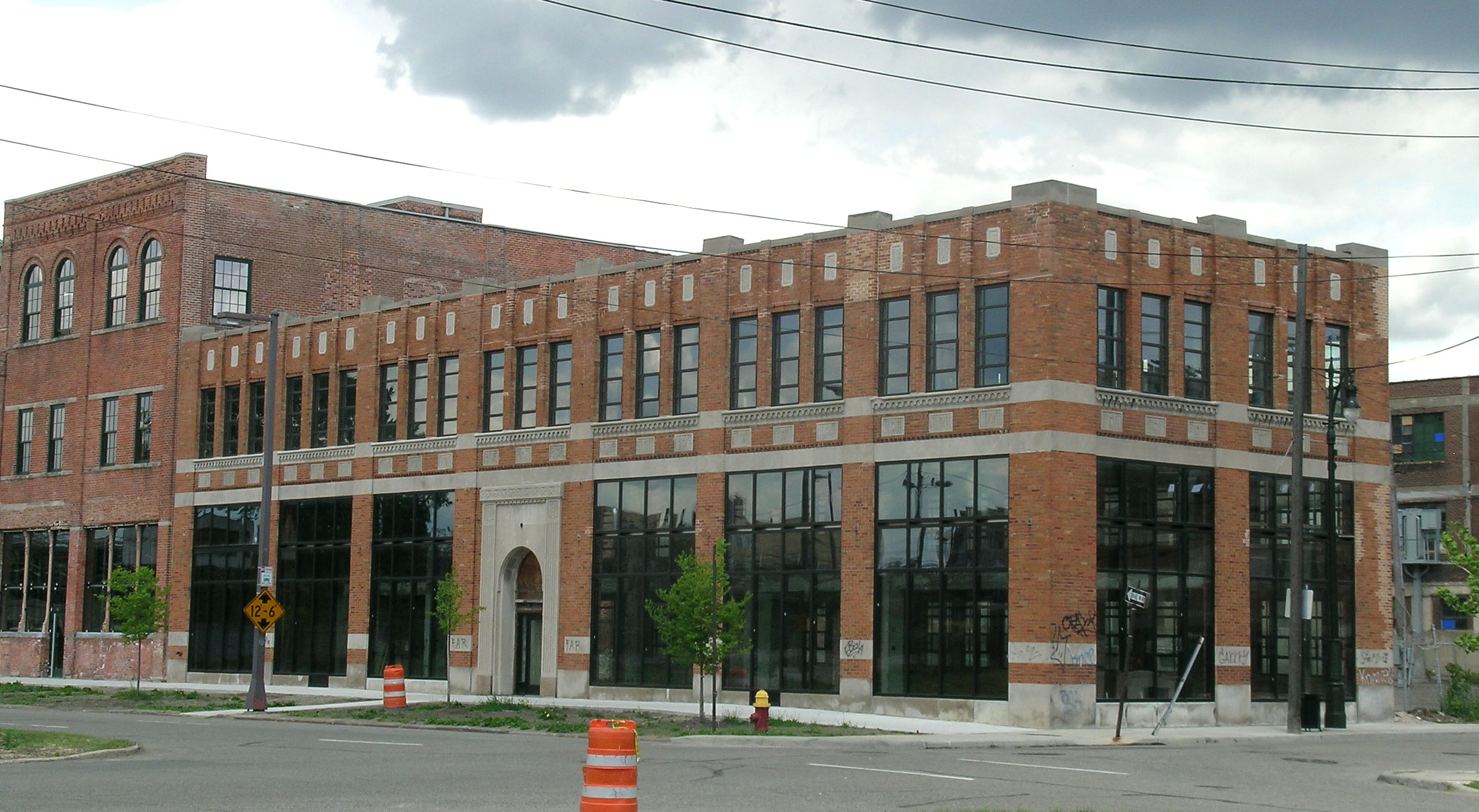
6200 Second Avenue, now the Lofts at New Amsterdam, with 62 loft units, located across from the new Pistons Performance Center

New Center has also seen redevelopment of existing structures. This includes U-Haul's 2013 restoration of the 250,000-square-foot, seven-story historic NBC-Nabisco Building, built in 1920 at 899 W. Baltimore St. and, in 2014, the conversion of the Hotel St. Regis annex into a 58-apartment residential building, now known as Regis Houze. In 2015, Central Detroit Christian Community Development Corporation announced a $10.2 million plan to renovate the four-story, 44-unit, 42,200-square-foot Casamira Apartments at 680 Delaware St., built in 1925. In 2018, a local investment group purchased the 125-room Hotel St. Regis, and plans a $6 million modernization, and that was followed by the purchase of the Albert Kahn Building by a joint venture with a $58 million plan to convert it into 211 apartments, and more than 75,000 square feet of retail and office space, and renamed, The Kahn. In 2022, the former WJBK-TV studios building was purchased, and donated to the nonprofit Midnight Golf Program to become their new headquarters. A $10-12 million reconstruction is planned.

In the Greater New Center area, the 1913, nine-story, so-called Rainbow Building, now known as, Chroma, completed a $16 million redevelopment with large floor-to-ceiling windows all around the building. Further redevelopment was underway at 3040 E. Grand Blvd and John R St, on the Albert Kahn historic 1901 designed sandstone constructed residence for Robert Robertson.

== Education ==
New Center is within the Detroit Public Schools district. DPS has its headquarters in the Fisher Building. The district paid the owner of the Fisher Building $24.1 million in 2002 so the district could occupy five floors in the building. Officials claimed leasing the Fisher Building as its headquarters was more economical than a remodel of the Maccabees Building in Midtown where the district previously had its headquarters.

Three schools, Golightly K-8, Loving Elementary, and Thirkell Elementary, serve sections of New Center for elementary school. Golightly K-8 and Durfee K-8 serve sections of New Center for middle school. All residents are zoned to Northwestern High School.

In addition, the New Center area houses the administrative offices of the University Prep Schools system, along with the following schools:

- Ellen Thompson Elementary School
- Mark Murray Elementary School
- University Prep Academy High School (New Center)

The College for Creative Studies (CCS) is a private, fully accredited college with campuses in Midtown and New Center, that offers Bachelor and Master of Fine Arts degrees . The New Center campus contains the Henry Ford Academy: School for Creative Studies, an art and design charter school for middle and high school students.

Beginning in the 1970s Wayne State University held its criminal justice program classes in the 147,500-square-foot (13,700 m^{2}) Criminal Justice Building, designed by Albert Kahn and built in 1920. By 2016 the university stopped use of the building, then used by the Detroit Police Department for training purposes. WSU sold it to real estate firm The Platform for $2 million and it will become a mixed-use development.

=== History of schools ===
Previously Sherhard K-8 served sections of New Center for elementary and middle school. Previously Hutchins Middle School served sections of New Center for middle school. Previously Murray-Wright High School and Northern High School served sections of New Center, while at the time Northwestern High School did not serve New Center.

== Media ==
During the 1950s and 1960s, the studios of WJBK (then a Storer Broadcasting-owned CBS affiliate) were on Second Avenue in New Center. After WJBK moved to Southfield in 1970, WTVS (Detroit Public Television), the city's PBS station, took over the New Center site and operated there until 2008.

== See also ==
- Woodward Corridor
- Woodbridge
- North End
- Lee Plaza
- Motown Museum
- Milwaukee Junction
- Neighborhoods in Detroit
