= Lee Plaza (Detroit) =

- Lee Plaza Hotel
- U.S. National Register of Historic Places
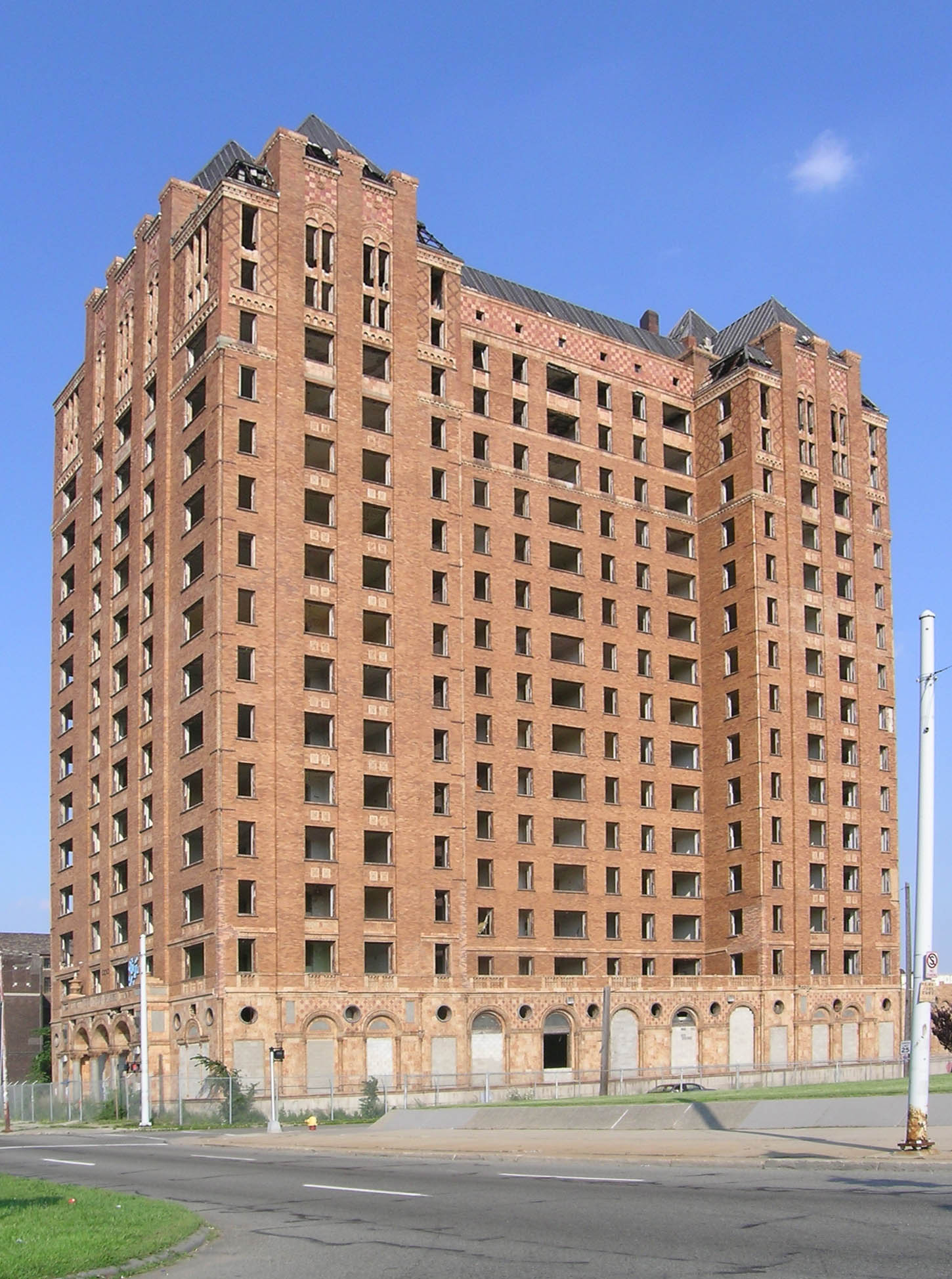

- Location within Michigan Location within the United States
- Interactive map
- Location: 2240 W. Grand Blvd. Detroit, Michigan
- Coordinates: 42°21′34″N 83°6′6″W
- Area: less than one acre
- Built: 1928; 98 years ago
- Architect: Charles Noble
- Architectural style: Art Deco
- NRHP reference No.: 81000319
- Added to NRHP: November 5, 1981

The Lee Plaza (also known as the Lee Plaza Hotel or Lee Plaza Apartments) is a vacant 16-story high-rise apartment building undergoing restoration located at 2240 West Grand Boulevard, about one mile west of New Center along West Grand Boulevard, an area in Detroit, Michigan. It is a registered historic site by the state of Michigan and was added to the United States National Register of Historic Places on November 5, 1981. Designed by Charles Noble and constructed in 1929, it rises to 16 floors and is an excellent example of Art Deco architecture of the 1920s.

== History ==
The Lee Plaza Hotel was built in 1928 for Ralph T. Lee, a Detroit developer. Noted residential architect Charles Noble designed the building. It was constructed to be an upscale apartment with hotel services. Decorated with sculpture and tile outside, the structure rivaled the Book-Cadillac and Statler Hotels for architectural notice in Detroit during the 1920s. The building opened in 1929, but Lee quickly sold it to the Detroit Investment Co. Like many companies, the Detroit Investment Co. had financial issues at the beginning of the Great Depression, and the Lee Plaza went through a series of owners, some of which Ralph T. Lee held an interest. By 1935 both Ralph Lee and the Lee Plaza were bankrupt.

The ownership of the building was tied-up in court until 1943. However, in that time luxury apartment living had fallen out of favor, residents left, and the hotel started renting rooms to transient guests. In 1968, the city of Detroit turned the building into a senior citizens' complex. However, in the 1980s, the Lee began losing residents, and the building finally closed in 1997.

Since that time, the Lee Plaza has been stripped of many of its architectural elements. The city has looked for a redeveloper, and in 2015, developer Craig Sasser, announced a $200 million redevelopment of Lee Plaza and the surrounding area. However, in October 2016, Harold Ince, interim executive director of the Detroit Housing Commission announced that the planned redevelopment appears dead after Sasser failed to purchase the property. In December 2017, the city issued an RFP (requests for proposal) for the 17-story Lee Plaza Tower on West Grand Boulevard at Lawton Street. The city received three proposals to redevelop the historic tower in March 2018 but ultimately decided in July that none were viable reuses of the 1929 building. New proposals for the building, which has undergone a $400,000, two-phase stabilization project, are now being accepted on a rolling basis.

== Restoration ==
In February 2019, the city of Detroit announced plans to sell Lee Plaza to a joint venture of the Roxbury Group and Ethos Development Partners for $350,000, that will redevelop the building into 180 residential units and retail. Construction on the first phase of the $60 million project is expected to start in 2022. This first phase would rehab nine floors into 117 apartments for income-eligible seniors.

On January 20, 2022, a more formal detailed explanation of the restoration of the building was announced. It will be a multi-year, multi-phase development. Phase 1, at $59 million, will restore the first floor main lobby, and create 117 affordable senior apartments on floors 2 through 10, with completion scheduled for 2024. Phase 2, at $20 million, would create 60 to 70 market-rate apartments on floors 11 through 16 with an anticipated 2025 completion date.

As of September 28, 2023, preliminary work had started including a new fence, sealed up entrances and replacement windows.

The formal groundbreaking for the restoration took place on May 13, 2025.

== Description ==
The Lee Plaza Hotel is a 15-story, "I" plan, steel and reinforced concrete structure, faced with orange glazed brick, with a steeply pitched roof originally covered in red tile (later replaced with copper, which has been since stripped). The first story of the building forms a terra cotta clad base with molded Palladian windows, from which prominent brick piers rise to the roof, forming strong vertical lines. Decorative details are inset in the form of terra cotta belt courses, spandrel plaques, corbelled friezes and window surrounds.

The interior contains 220 one to four room apartments. The first floor has a main lobby with a coffered ceiling, east and west lounges, two wood-paneled dining rooms, and a ballroom. The main hallway was dubbed "Peacock Alley," a barrel-vaulted space with coffered ceiling covered in a rich color scheme of blues, golds and greens. The basement originally contained a beauty parlor, a game room, a children's playroom, and a meat market and grocer.

== Gallery ==
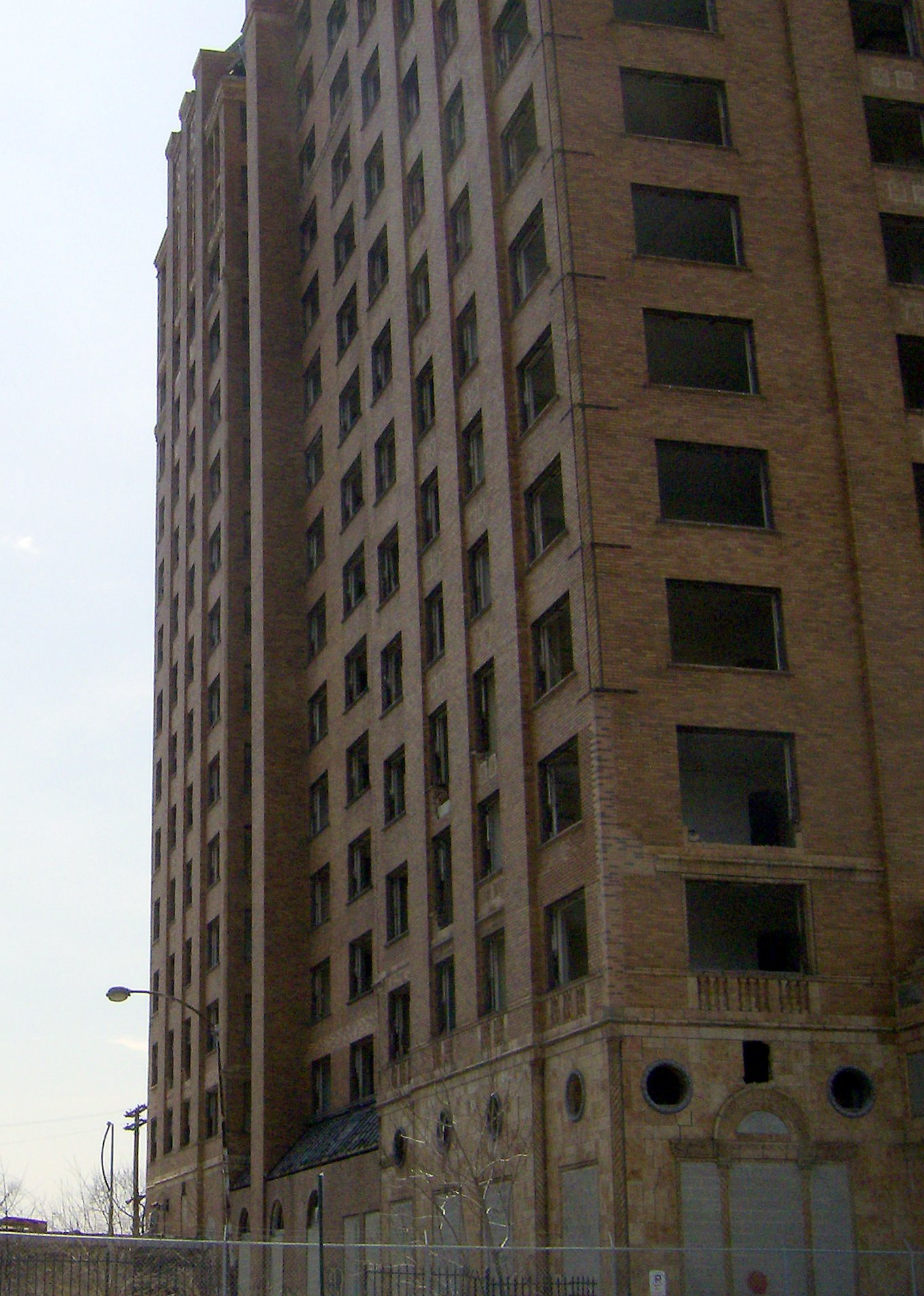
The vacant structure has no windows (new windows as of October 2023)

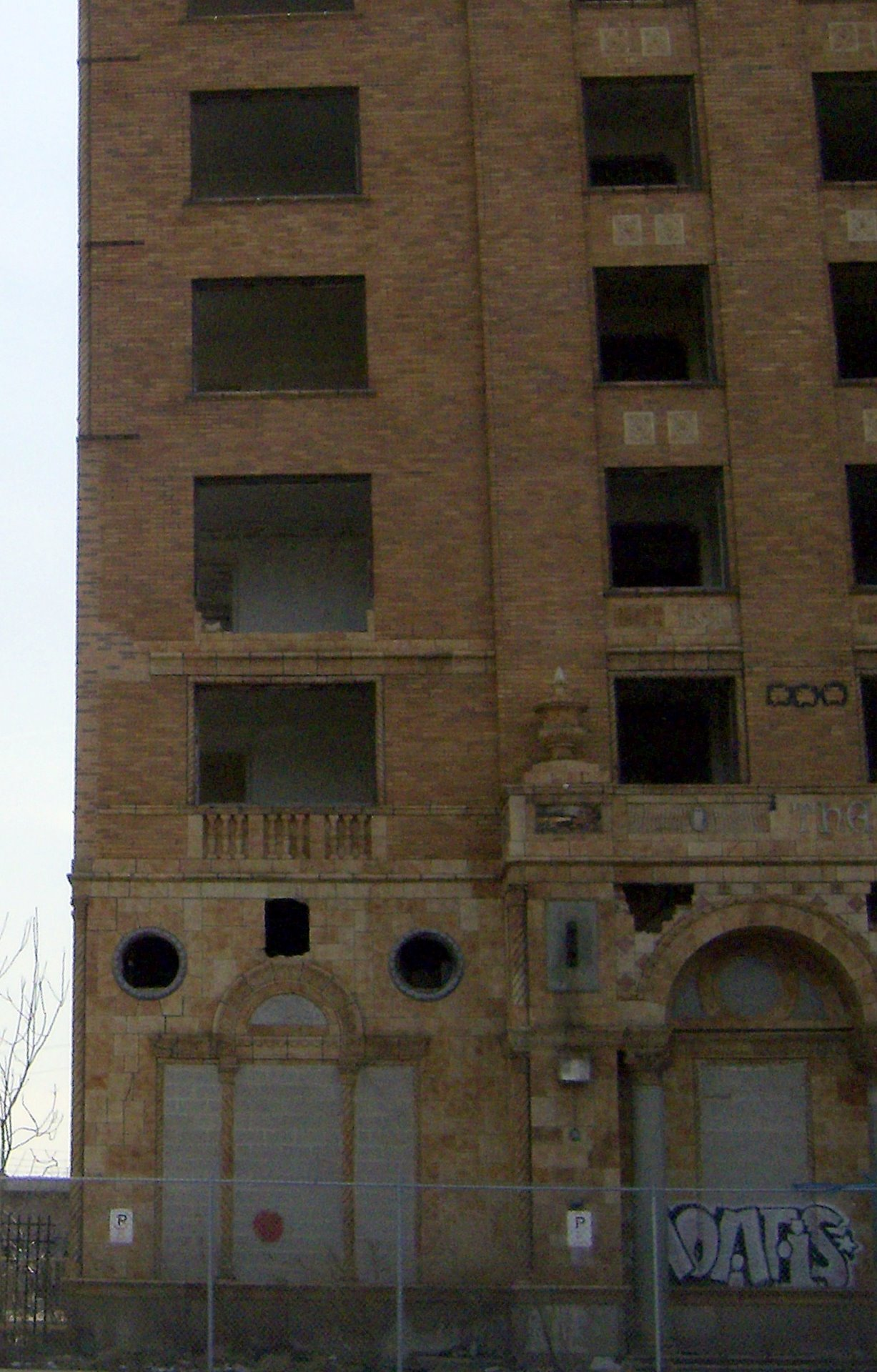
The street level with bricked and fenced window openings

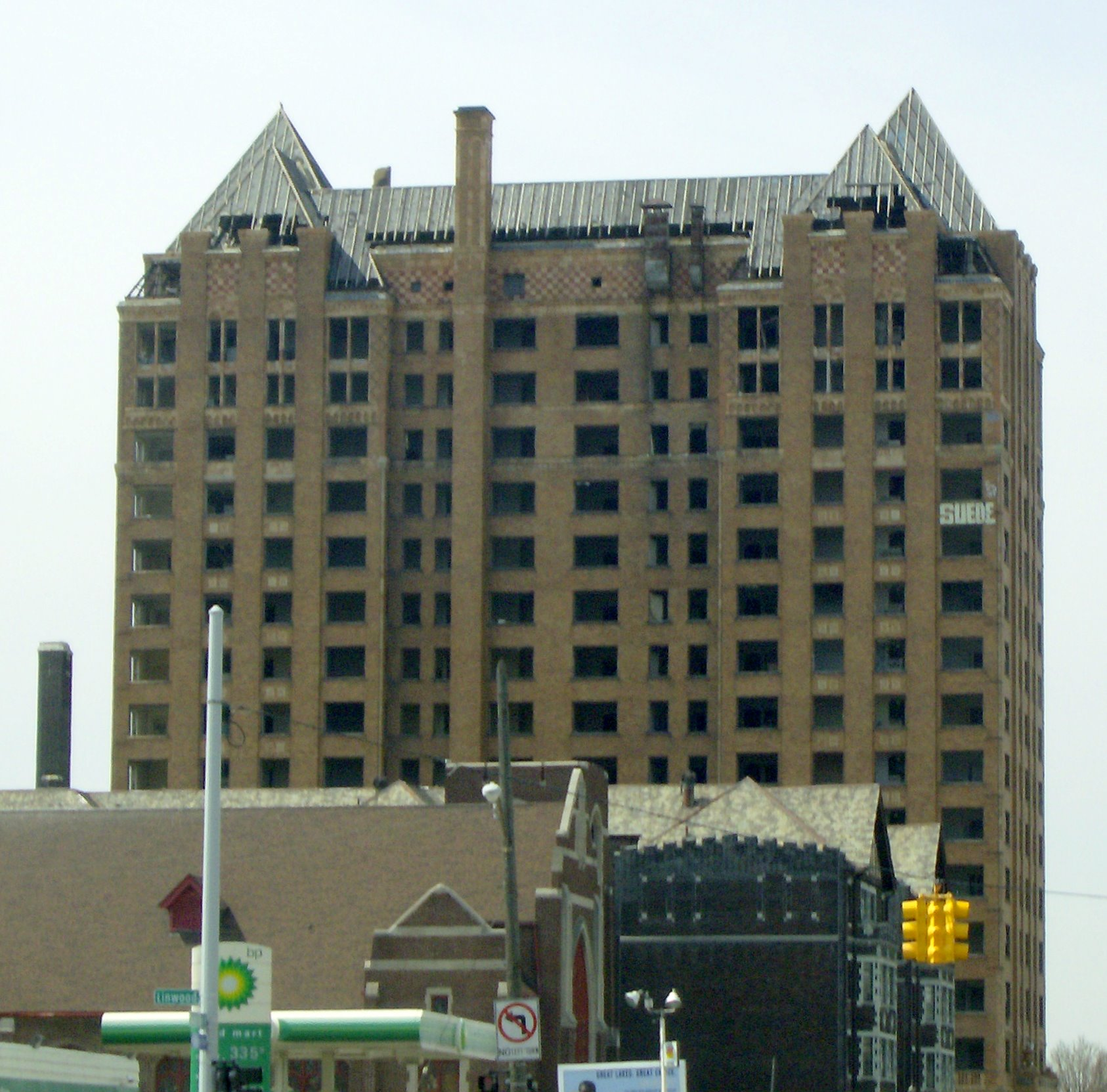
The roof is heavily damaged

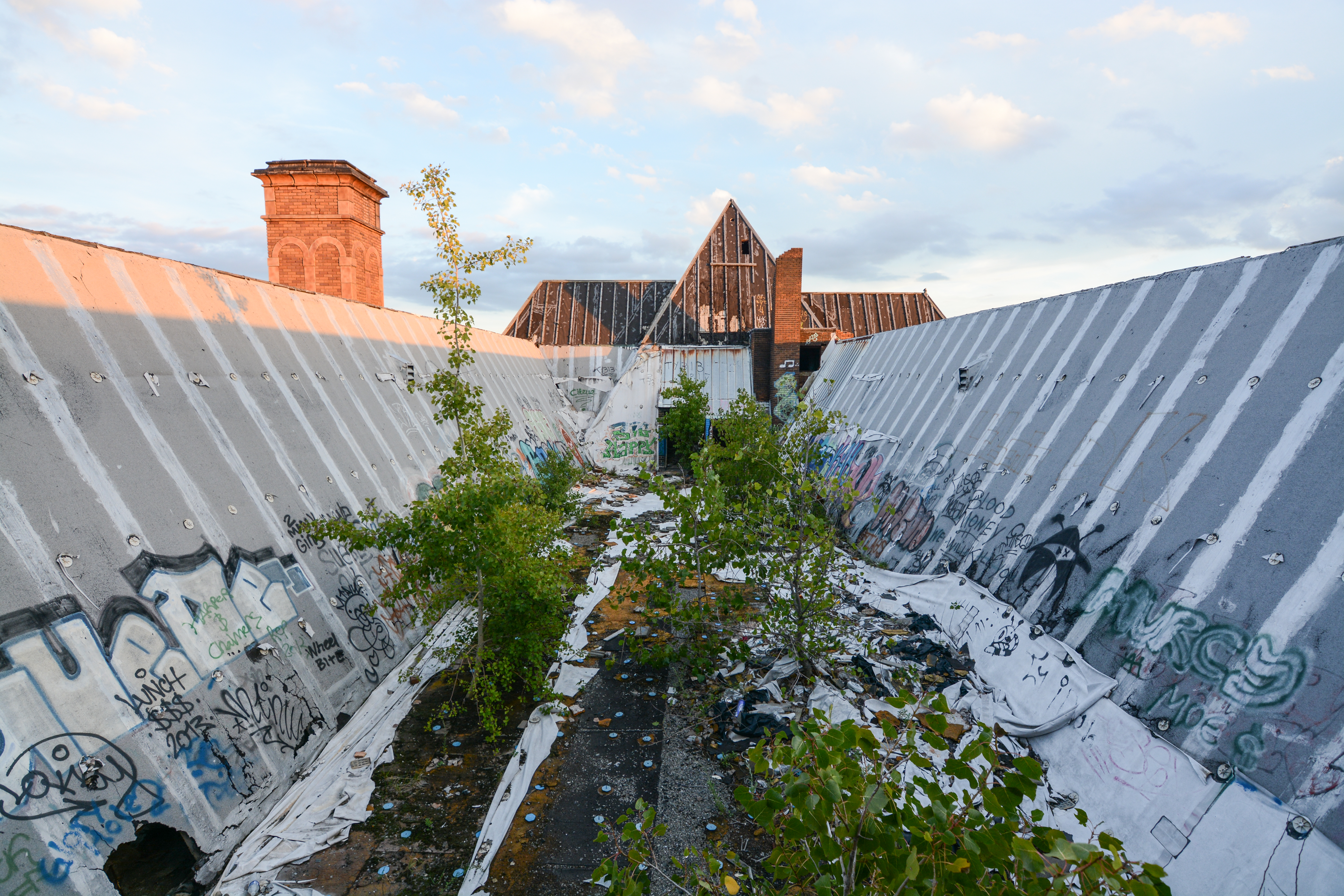
Rooftop of the Lee Plaza in 2016

== See also ==
- National Register of Historic Places in Detroit, Michigan
