= New Center Park =

Park in Detroit, Michigan, United States

Coordinates: 42°22′06.6″N 83°04′36.3″W

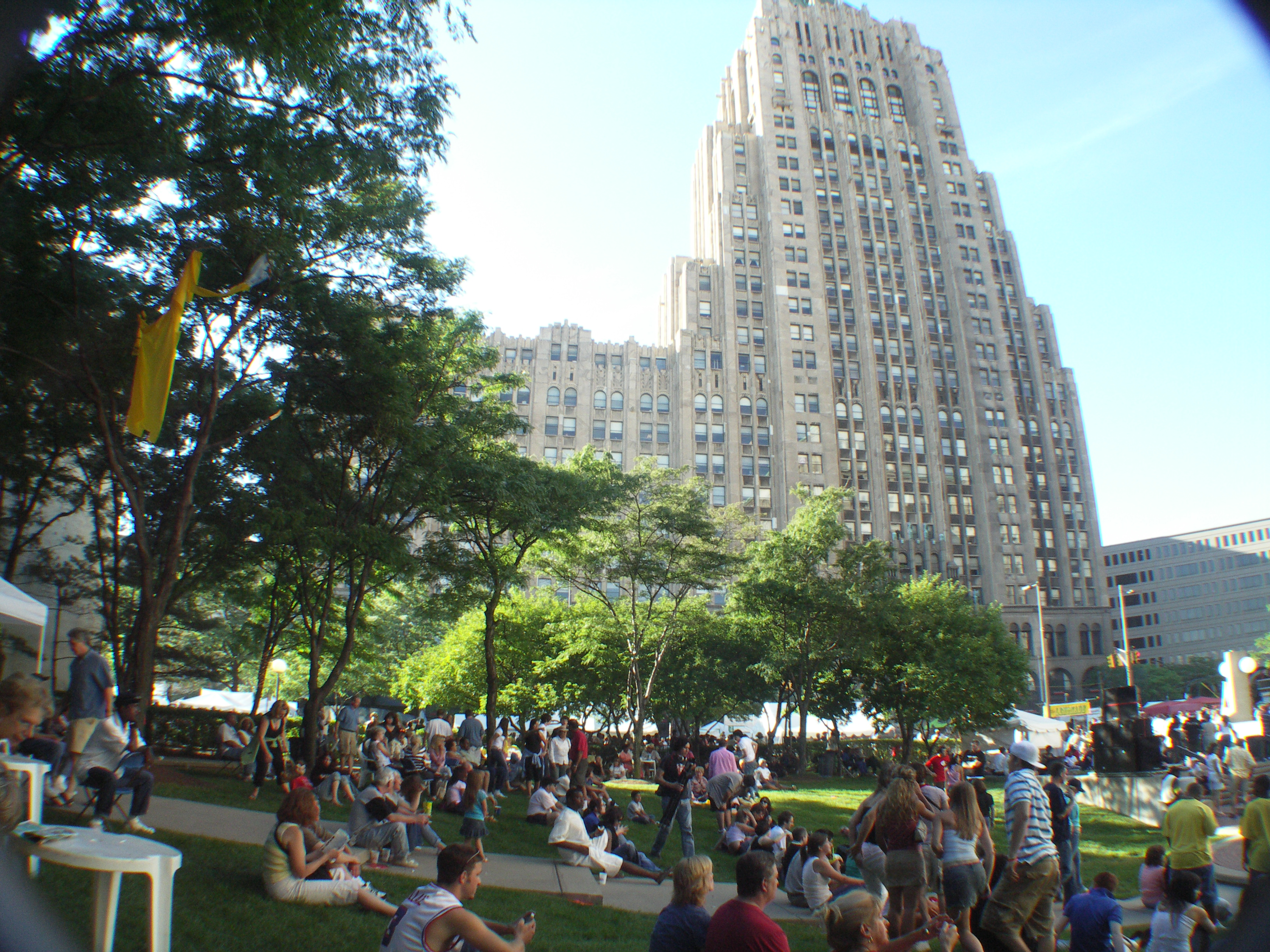
New Center Park, July 2005

New Center Park is located at the southwest corner of Second Avenue and West Grand Boulevard across from the Fisher Building and west of Cadillac Place in Detroit's New Center. General Motors built it and another pocket park at Second Avenue and West Milwaukee Street in 1977, during a period of investment in extensive renovation of the surrounding fifty-block area, an area the company renamed "New Center Commons." It is now owned and operated by Midtown Detroit, Inc, a 501(c)(3) community and economic development organization.

For many years, the park has hosted a summer long series of weekly events held in the New Center area. These include outdoor movies and concerts, happy hour, summer jazz, and regular events for families and children. It began as TasteFest, then became the annual five-day CityFest food festival that occurs near Independence Day weekend in the New Center district of Detroit, Michigan. It has since become a summer long affair with the advent called "New Center Park" after the park's name. The New Center Council has constructed a center stage with a 1,000-person outdoor concert venue capable of hosting national acts in the Park at W. Grand Boulevard and Second Ave along with a 5,000 sq ft (460 m^{2}). outdoor patio.

The events have traditionally been sponsored by Comerica. The main attractions of the event are vendors representing local restaurants and caterers that provide condensed versions of their menus for sale. The festival is supplemented by live music and other performances, as well as merchandise vendors. Locally referred to as simply "New Center Park."

In 2010, the "New Center Park" summer-long series of events replaced CityFest.

== See also ==
- New Center, Detroit
