= Bruce Holmes =

American gridiron football player (born 1965)

No. 57, 58, 53, 51, 54, 52
- Position: Linebacker

Personal information
- Born: October 24, 1965 (age 61); El Paso, Texas, U.S.
- Listed height: 6 ft 2 in (1.88 m)
- Listed weight: 235 lb (107 kg)

Career information
- High school: Henry Ford (Detroit, Michigan)
- College: Minnesota
- NFL draft: 1987: 12th round, 325th overall pick

Career history
- Kansas City Chiefs (1987); Cleveland Browns (1988)*; Toronto Argonauts (1988–1989); Ottawa Rough Riders (1989–1990); BC Lions (1991); New York Jets (1991)*; Toronto Argonauts (1992); Minnesota Vikings (1993)
- * Offseason or practice squad member only

Awards and highlights
- CFL East All-Star (1990); First-team All-Big Ten (1986)
- Stats at Pro Football Reference

Bruce Barton Holmes (born October 24, 1965) is an American former professional football linebacker who played two seasons in the National Football League (NFL) with the Kansas City Chiefs and Minnesota Vikings. He was selected by the Chiefs in the twelfth round of the 1987 NFL draft. He played college football at the University of Minnesota. Holmes was also a member of the Toronto Argonauts, Ottawa Rough Riders and BC Lions of the Canadian Football League (CFL).

== Early life ==
Holmes attended Henry Ford High School in Detroit, Michigan.

== College career ==
Holmes played for the Minnesota Golden Gophers from 1983 to 1986. He was named First-team All-Big Ten in 1986 by the coaches. He was the defensive MVP of the 1985 Independence Bowl.

== Professional career ==
Pre-draft measurables
Height	Weight	Arm length	Hand span	40-yard dash	10-yard split	20-yard split	20-yard shuttle	Vertical jump	Broad jump	Bench press
6 ft 1 7/8 in (1.88 m)	229 lb (104 kg)	31 1/2 in (0.80 m)	10 1/2 in (0.27 m)	4.92 s	1.70 s	2.80 s	4.50 s	28.0 in (0.71 m)	8 ft 9 in (2.67 m)	15 reps
All values from NFL Combine

Holmes was selected by the Kansas City Chiefs of the NFL in the 12th round with the 325th overall pick in the 1987 NFL draft. He played in three games, all starts, for the Chiefs during the 1987 season. He played in seventeen games for the CFL's Toronto Argonauts from 1988 to 1989. Holmes played in 22 games for the Ottawa Rough Riders of the CFL from 1989 to 1990. He earned CFL East All-Star honors in 1990. He played in eleven games for the BC Lions of the CFL during the 1991 season. Holmes played in two games for the Toronto Argonauts in 1992. He played in one game for the NFL's Minnesota Vikings in 1993.
