= Virginia Park Historic District =

Historic district in Michigan, United States

- U.S. National Register of Historic Places
- U.S. Historic district
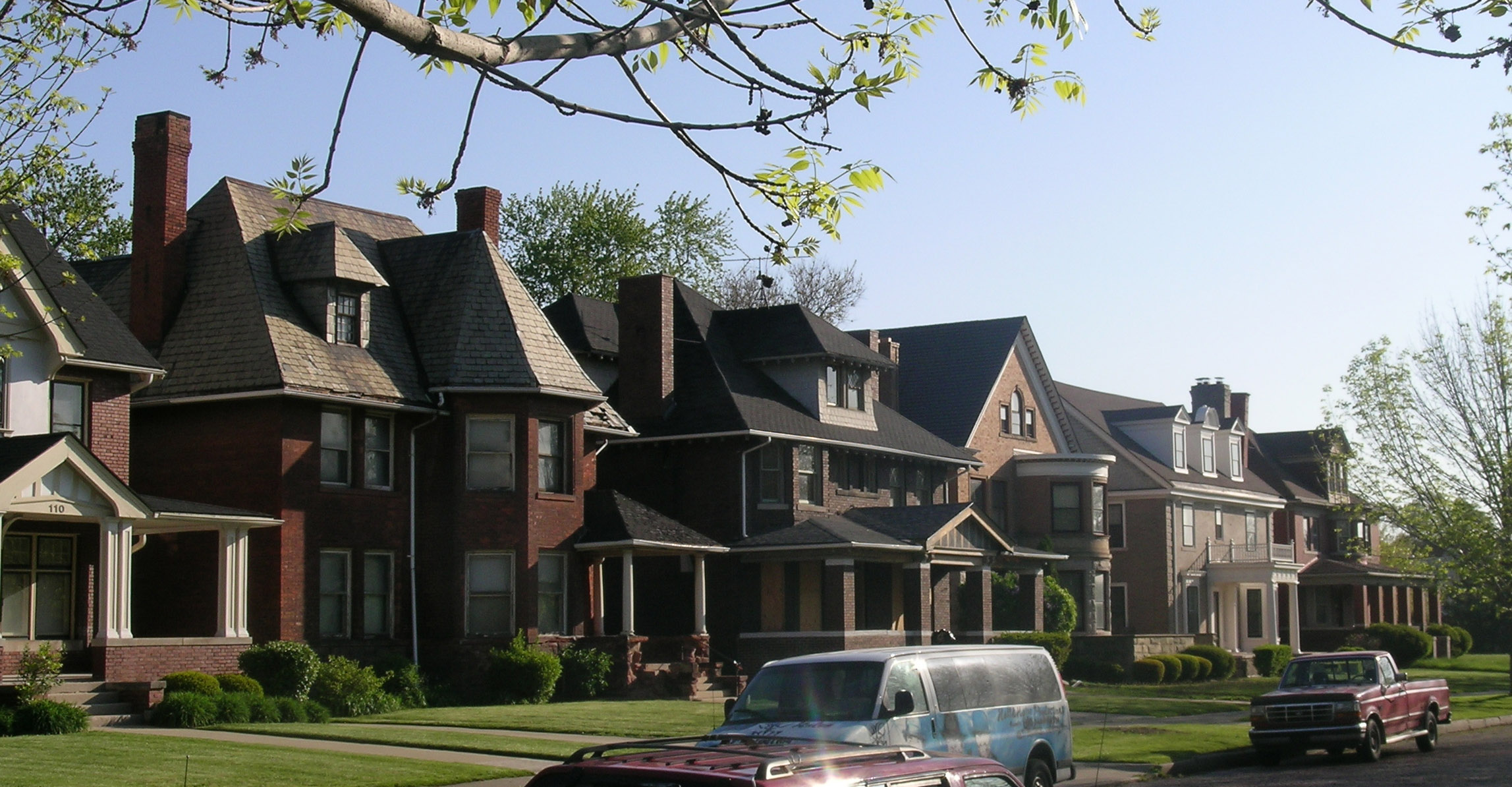
- Virginia Park Streetscape between Woodward Ave. and Second
- Interactive map
- Location: Both sides of Virginia Park from Woodward Ave. to John Lodge Service Dr., Detroit, Michigan
- Coordinates: 42°22′28″N 83°4′53″W
- Area: 22 acres (8.9 ha)
- Built: 1895
- Architect: Richard Marr; Joseph Mills; George V. Pottle; Smith, Hinchman and Grylls; Chittenden and Kotting; Malcomson and Higginbotham
- Architectural style: Mixed (more than two styles from different periods)
- NRHP reference No.: 82000557
- Added to NRHP: December 2, 1982

The Virginia Park Historic District is located on the north side of New Center, an area in Detroit, Michigan, along both sides of Virginia Park Street from Woodward Avenue to the John C. Lodge Freeway access road. The district was listed on the National Register of Historic Places in 1982.

The Virginia Park Historic District is an example of a well–preserved late nineteenth to early twentieth century residential community. The residences are testimonials to the wealth of early Virginia Park residents, as the area was conceived as an upper-middle class enclave. Many homes were completed by prominent Detroit architects, and display a diversity of architectural styles.

== History ==
The district was laid out in 1893 by developers John W. Leggett, Frank E. Snow, and Joseph C. Hough. Ninety-two lots were platted and each given a name (such as Tanglewood, Thisteldown, and Sorrento) in the original plat. The developers placed a number of restrictions on the area to ensure an attractive community. This quiet boulevard attracted a mix of businessmen and professionals. The first houses were constructed in 1895. By 1908 more than two dozen houses had been constructed in the district.

By 1910, homeowners became concerned about the effect of the increasing commercialization of Woodward Avenue on property values, and they formed the Virginia Avenue Improvement Association. The association proposed to re-landscape the subdivision, and it developed an attractive entrance to the community. The neighborhood continued to thrive during the 1920s. It suffered in the 1930s from the Great Depression, the effects of which continued through the 1940s.

By the 1950s and 1960s, many of the houses had absentee landlords, or were divided into rooming houses. The Algiers Motel, at one time located at the corner of Virginia Park and Woodward, was the scene of an incident of police brutality during the 1967 Detroit riot where three men were killed and others were beaten.

In 1979, General Motors announced its plan to renovate the area north of its World Headquarters. This fostered rehabilitation in the Virginia Park district. The Algiers Motel was demolished in 1979, and replaced with a park space. The Virginia Park Historic District is considered to mark the northern boundary of the New Center area of Detroit.

In 2022, one of Detroit's last remaining brick streets, built in 1907 in Virginia Park, began a $2 million rehabilitation. Stretching three blocks along Virginia Park Street between Woodward Ave, and the Lodge Freeway. As many as 20,000 age-appropriate Nelsonville block pavers have been assembled for the repair work.

== Description ==
The Virginia Park District was platted as a series of lots 50 feet wide and 163 feet deep. The original restrictions in the neighborhood ensured a uniformity in the streetscape. All buildings are constructed of brick or stone, and have the same setback from the street. All are single family houses, with no more than one house on each fifty foot lot.

At the time of its historic designation, the district included 57 structures, all but three of which contribute to the historic character of neighborhood. Non-contributing structures included an apartment building at 650 Virginia Park, an office building at 613 Virginia Park, and a hospital (demolished in 2014) at 801-831 Virginia Park. Fifty-one of the contributing structures were used as homes, two as offices and one as a rest home. The residences were constructed between 1895 and 1915, with the older structures placed closer to Woodward, and newer ones, in general, farther westward.

== Education ==
The area is zoned to Detroit Public Schools.

All residents are zoned to Thirkell Elementary School, Hutchins Middle School, and Northwestern High School.

== Images ==
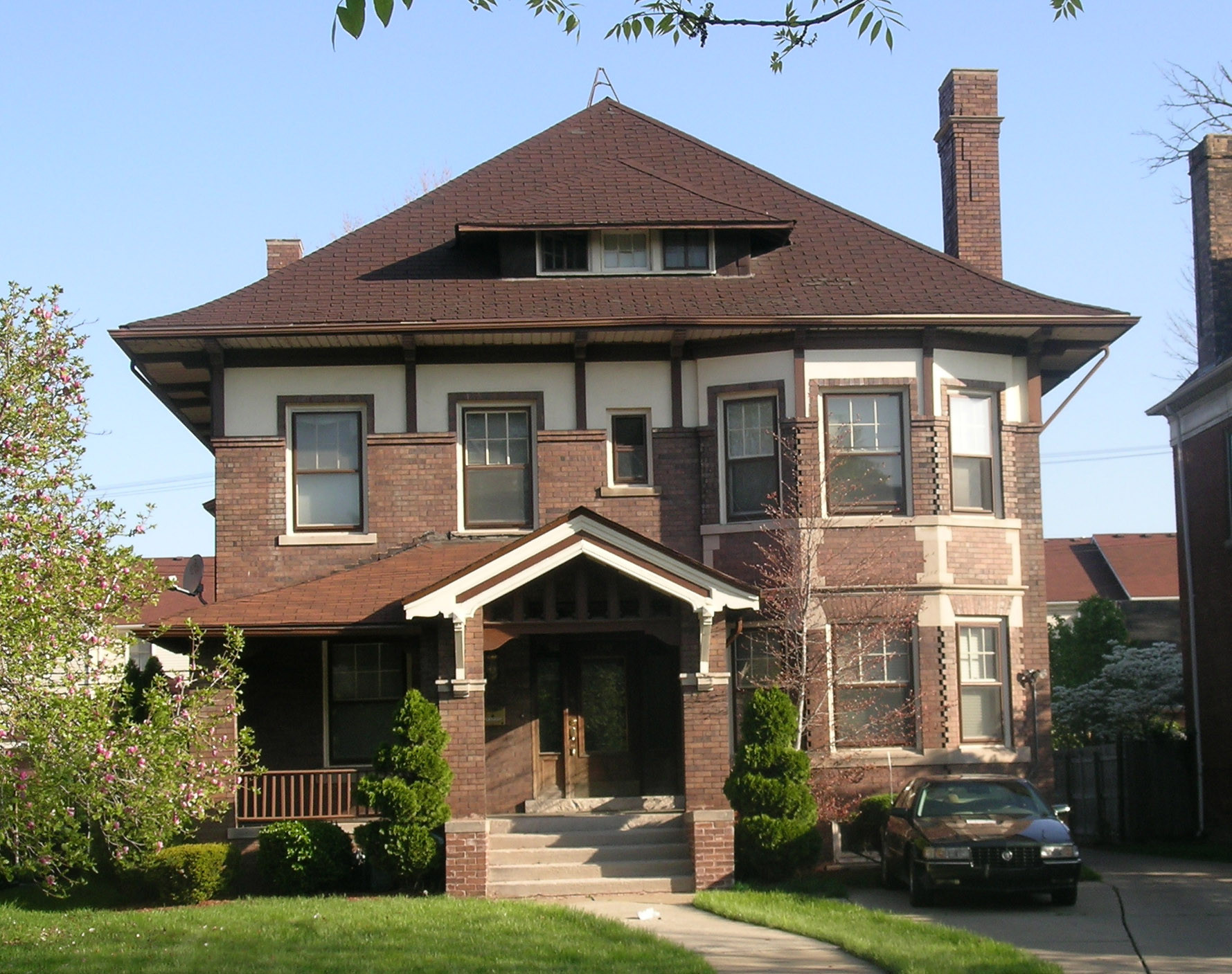
House in Virginia Park.

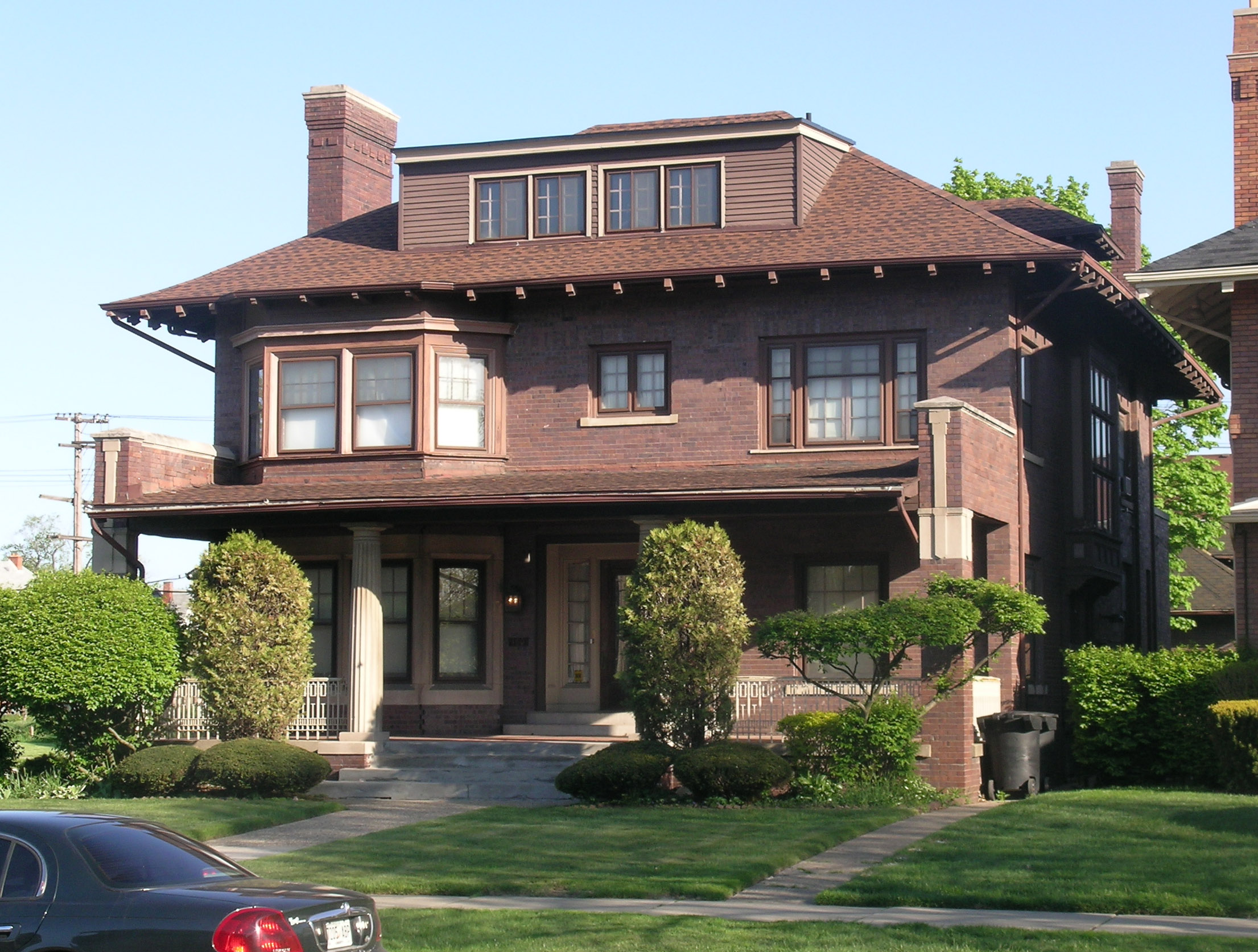
House in Virginia Park.

== See also ==
- Midtown
- New Center
- Corktown
- North Corktown
- National Register of Historic Places listings in Detroit, Michigan

== References and further reading ==
- Hill, Eric J. and John Gallagher (2002). AIA Detroit: The American Institute of Architects Guide to Detroit Architecture. Wayne State University Press. ISBN 0-8143-3120-3.
- Meyer, Katherine Mattingly and Martin C.P. McElroy with Introduction by W. Hawkins Ferry, Hon A.I.A. (1980). Detroit Architecture A.I.A. Guide Revised Edition. Wayne State University Press. ISBN 0-8143-1651-4.
