= Gary Plummer (basketball) =

American basketball player

Personal information
- Born: February 21, 1962 (age 64) Highland Park, Michigan, U.S.
- Listed height: 6 ft 9 in (2.06 m)
- Listed weight: 215 lb (98 kg)

Career information
- High school: Osborn (Detroit, Michigan)
- College: Boston University (1980–1984)
- NBA draft: 1984: 2nd round, 45th overall pick
- Drafted by: Golden State Warriors
- Playing career: 1984–2000
- Position: Power forward
- Number: 44, 45

Career history
- 1984–1985: Golden State Warriors
- 1986–1987: Charleston Gunners
- 1987: Rapid City Thrillers
- 1987–1988: Caja de Ronda
- 1990–1992: Basket Brescia
- 1992–1993: Denver Nuggets
- 1993–1994: Dafni
- 1994–1995: Hapoel Gvat
- 1995: Gigantes de Carolina
- 1995: Levallois
- 1995: Virtus Roma
- 1995–1996: Club de Regatas Lima
- 1996: Quilmes
- 1996: Gigantes de Carolina
- 1996–1997: Club de Regatas Lima
- 1999–2000: Maccabi Hadera

Career highlights
- Greek League All-Star (1994 I); First-team All-ECAC North (1984)
- Stats at NBA.com
- Stats at Basketball Reference

Gary Dean Plummer (born February 21, 1962) is an American former professional basketball player, who played in the National Basketball Association (NBA).

== College career ==
Plummer, a 6'9" tall power forward-center, played high school basketball at Osborn High School in Detroit, Michigan. After high school, Plummer played college basketball for the Boston University Terriers from 1980 to 1984.

== Professional career ==
Plummer was selected by the Golden State Warriors of the NBA, in the second round, with the 45th overall pick of the 1984 NBA draft. Plummer played in two NBA seasons. He played with both the Warriors and the Denver Nuggets. In his NBA career, Plummer played in a total of 126 games, in which he scored a total of 531 points.

Plummer also played pro club basketball in Israel, Italy, Spain, and Greece.

== Post-playing career ==
Plummer now runs the N Your Court (NYC) basketball camps and AAU programs.

== Career statistics ==
Legend
GP	Games played	GS	Games started	MPG	Minutes per game
FG%	Field goal percentage	3P%	3-point field goal percentage	FT%	Free throw percentage
RPG	Rebounds per game	APG	Assists per game	SPG	Steals per game
BPG	Blocks per game	PPG	Points per game	**Bold**	Career high

=== NBA ===
==== Regular season ====
Year	Team	GP	GS	MPG	FG%	3P%	FT%	RPG	APG	SPG	BPG	PPG
1984–85	Golden State	**66**	0	10.6	.397	**.250**	.707	2.0	.4	**.2**	**.2**	3.8
1992–93	Denver	60	0	**12.3**	**.465**	.000	**.726**	**2.9**	**.7**	**.2**	**.2**	**4.7**
Career		126	0	11.4	.430	.143	.717	2.4	.5	.2	.2	4.2
