= Dan Rather Reports =

American weekly news television show

- Presented by: Dan Rather
- Starring: Dan Rather
- Narrated by: Dan Rather

Original release
- Network: AXS TV
- Release: November 14, 2006 – October 21, 2013

Dan Rather Reports is a weekly news television show hosted by former CBS news anchor Dan Rather and airing on AXS TV from 2006 until 2013.

The show premiered on November 14, 2006, when Rather was 75 years old. As host, correspondent, and narrator, Rather had been given full creative and editorial control over the new program. Rather planned to focus the show on field correspondence news, investigative journalism, and politics. The hour-long show is broadcast on Tuesdays at 8:00 p.m. ET (rebroadcast at 11:00). Its longer format allows for more in-depth presentation of issues.

Initially The New York Times commented that it "seems to favor Democrats who love America".

In 2008, Dan Rather Reports was awarded a News and Documentary Emmy. The show was also nominated for Emmy awards in 2007 and 2009.

== Episodes ==
- A National Disgrace, low literacy in Detroit Public Schools
- A Few Good Men, A Lot of Bad Water, toxic water contamination at Camp Lejeune, North Carolina
- Iran's Manhattan Project, September 22, 2009, money laundering for Iran's nuclear program
