= Mark Brisker =

American-Israeli basketball player

Mark Brisker מארק בריסקר
Personal information
- Born: September 22, 1969 (age 57) Detroit, Michigan, U.S.
- Listed height: 6 ft 5 in (1.96 m)
- Listed weight: 180 lb (82 kg)

Career information
- High school: Henry Ford (Detroit, Michigan)
- College: Central Michigan (1987–1988); Polk State (1989–1990); Stetson (1990–1992)
- NBA draft: 1992: undrafted
- Playing career: 1992–2006
- Position: Shooting guard
- Number: 5

Career history
- 1992–1993: Quad City Thunder
- 1993–1994: Ironi Ramat Gan
- 1994–1995: Hartford Hellcats
- 1996–1999: Maccabi Ra'anana
- 1999–2002: Maccabi Tel Aviv
- 2002–2003: Hapoel Galil Elyon
- 2003: Ionikos
- 2003: Hapoel Jerusalem
- 2003–2004: Hapoel Galil Elyon
- 2004–2005: Maccabi Petach Tikva

Career highlights
- CBA All-Rookie Second Team (1993); 2× First-team All-TAAC (1991, 1992); TAAC Newcomer of the Year (1991)

Mark Brisker (Hebrew: מארק בריסקר; born September 22, 1969) is an American-Israeli 1.96 m (6 ft 5 in) tall former basketball guard.

He was born in Detroit, Michigan. At Henry Ford High School, in 1987 he was a second-team Class A All-State pick by the Free Press. He played college basketball for Polk Community College and Stetson University.

Brisker played in the Continental Basketball Association (CBA) for the Quad City Thunder during the 1992–93 season and Hartford Hellcats during the 1994–95 season. He was selected to the CBA All-Rookie Second Team in 1993.

He played for a number of professional teams, including Maccabi Tel Aviv of the Israeli Super League.

His son, born in 1998, is Israeli basketball player Michael Brisker.
