= Hotel St. Regis, Detroit =

Hotel in Detroit, Michigan, US

Hotel St. Regis
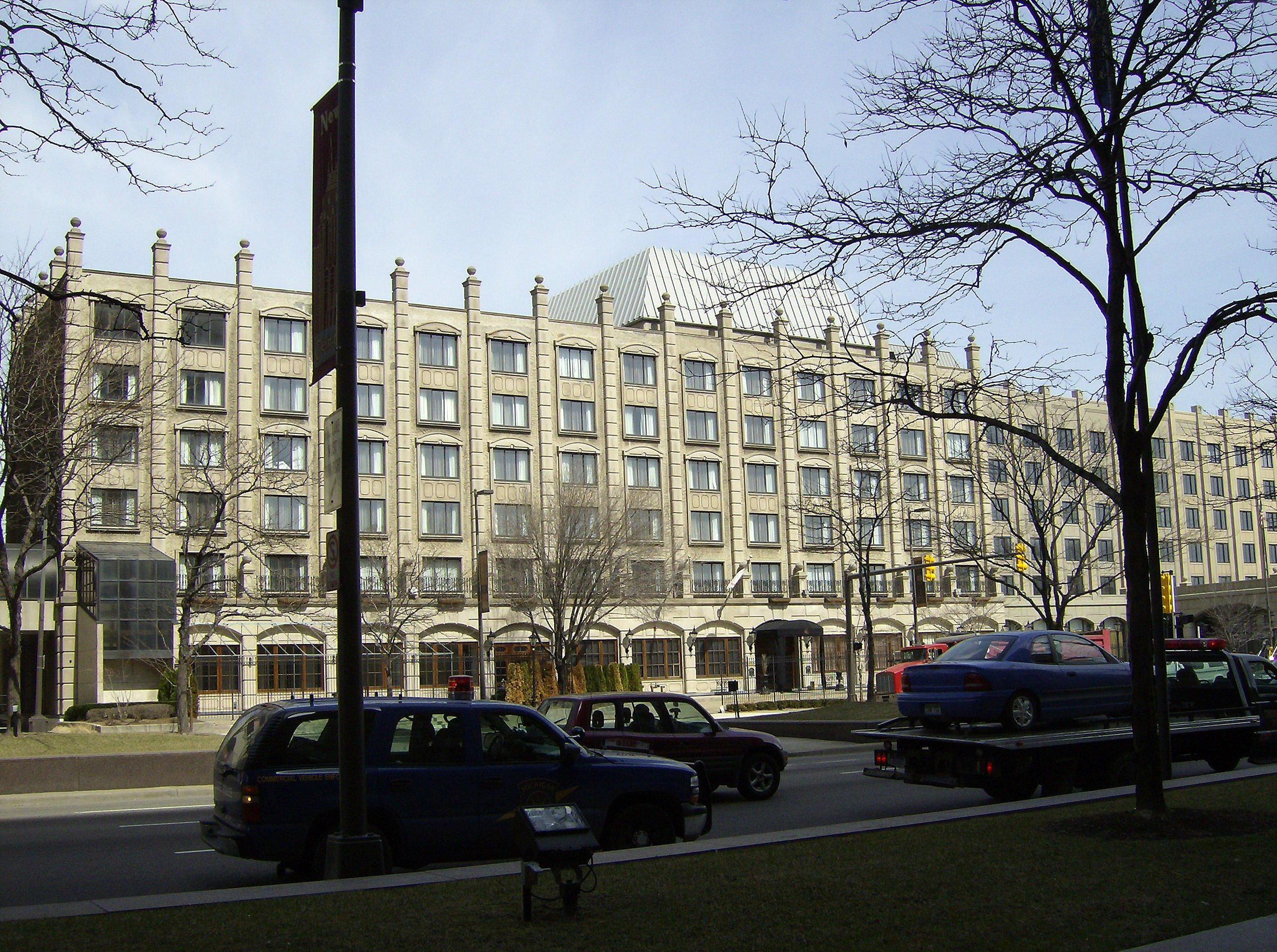
- Hotel St Regis Detroit Exterior

General information
- Location: 3071 West Grand Boulevard; Detroit, Michigan
- Coordinates: 42.37008°N 83.07502°W
- Opening: August 1966

Design and construction
- Architect: Weils-Cohan Associates

Other information
- Number of rooms: 125
- Number of suites: 7
- Number of restaurants: 1
- Parking: Valet
- Public transit: QLine Grand Boulevard; DDOT 4 SMART FAST Woodward 461, 462

Website
- www.hotelstregisdetroit.com

The Hotel St. Regis is a luxury boutique hotel in New Center, Detroit, Michigan. The hotel connects to Cadillac Place and the Fisher Building, both on the list of National Historic Landmarks in Michigan. The hotel has 5,000 square feet (460 m^{2}) of meeting space. The hotel was built in the Neoclassical architecture style.

== History ==
The hotel opened in August 1966. The hotel was designed to be an elegant, old world hotel that would serve General Motors executives traveling to the Cadillac building and the most sophisticated travelers. Weils-Cohan Associates created the plaster décor and the French Regency architecture. The hotel featured red fleur-de-lis tiles similar to those used in ancient European sidewalks, 23k gold trimmed walnut paneling, crystal chandeliers and antiques from all around the world. At the time, owners Albert J. Goodman and Floyd Rice believed in reviving the elements of the past and combining those with the comforts of the present.

Notable guests to the hotel have included Martin Luther King Jr., Mick Jagger, Aretha Franklin, Andrew Young, Anita Baker, Stevie Wonder, The Four Tops, George Clinton, DMX, Billy Dee Williams, Pharrell, Jay Leno, Pat Morita, and many more Motown stars.

The hotel was reopened to much fanfare in 2007 after it was redeveloped by a group of local investors led by real estate de Herb Strather.

In February 2009, the hotel went into default with its original lender, Chicago-based ShoreBank Corp.

In 2011, the hotel was sold for $850,000 to an entity controlled by Shirley Wilson, part of the group of owners who renovated and reopened the hotel in 2007.
