= Henry Ford High School =

High school in Detroit, Wayne County, Michigan

Location
- 20000 Evergreen Road; Detroit, Michigan; United States; 42.439°N 83.238°W

Information
- Established: 1957
- Principal: Michael Mokdad
- Teaching staff: 34.60 (FTE)
- Enrollment: 605 (2023–2024)
- Student to teacher ratio: 17.49
- Colors: Brown and Gold
- Athletics conference: Detroit Public School League
- Nickname: Trojans
- Website: www.detroitk12.org/ford

Student assessments
- 2021–22 school year Change vs. prior year

M-STEP 11th grade proficiency rates (Science / Social Studies)
- Advanced %: ≤5 / ≤5
- Proficient %: ≤5 / ≤5
- PR. Proficient %: <3 / –
- Not Proficient %: – / –

Average test scores
- SAT Total: 753.3 (▲ +47.8)

Henry Ford High School is located at 20000 Evergreen Road, on the northwest side of Detroit, Michigan. The facility is staffed and operated by Detroit Public Schools. Ford High opened its doors on September 5, 1957; it was constructed to accommodate an overflow of students from nearby Cooley, Mumford, and Redford high schools. In 2007, DPS closed Redford High School. As a result, Henry Ford High School now serves the Detroit sub-community of Old Redford. DPS will re-assume control of Henry Ford High School in fall 2017.

== School history ==
Built on Detroit's West side in the late 1950s, the school was completed in Fall 1962. Ford was built to accommodate the student overflow from Mumford, Redford, and Cooley high schools as population increased in this area. When it first opened, Ford's north-side was a bare cinder-block wall. When it was removed a few years later, the school's classroom sections were connected to the auditorium and gym.

Less than three years after the January 1955 ground breaking ceremony, Detroit's Henry Ford High School (located on Evergreen Rd, between Trojan and Fargo) opened its doors to 9th and 10th grade students on September 5, 1957. The school was built on a 23.5-acre (95,000 m^{2}) site (costing $120,000), which was part of a parcel of land known as Southfield Woods. The building cost was $2.275M. At that time Ford consisted mainly of classrooms and a cafeteria – there was no 11th or 12th grade until the fall of 1959. Ford had no gym, auditorium, or laboratory facilities. Its initial capacity was designed for 1,225 people. The initial enrollment was 1,541 students and 64 faculty. Construction of additional facilities were completed by the end of 1962.

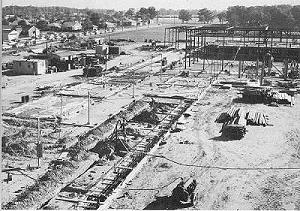
Henry Ford High School under construction

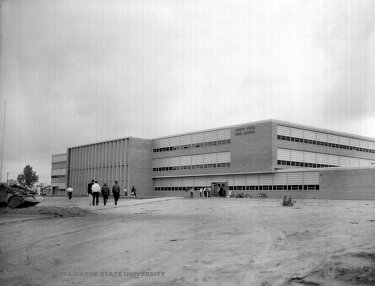
Henry Ford High School shortly after construction in 1957

== Athletics ==
The Trojans won the school's first state title in 2016 when they captured the boys basketball state championship.

== In popular culture ==
- The school was featured in the 2011 Dan Rather report, "A National Disgrace." In the fall of 2010 there were 826 students appearing for the first day of school at Ford, while the previous year it had 1,300 students.

== Notable alumni ==
- Bishop William Murphy, gospel recording artist and founder/lead pastor of The dReam Center Church of Atlanta.
- Bobby Abrams, former NFL player for the New York Giants.
- Ijnanya Alhamisi (1991), champion track woman in high school at Ford; she was first to the finish line in the 400-meter dash at the 1990 MHSAA finals. Ijnanya was also the MHSAA 400-meter silver medalist in 1991.
- Mark Brisker, American-Israeli professional basketball player.
- Reggie Brown, former NFL player for the Seattle Seahawks.
- Monica Conyers, former president of the Detroit City Council
- Bruce Holmes, former NFL player for the Kansas City Chiefs.
- Michael Holt (1969), won the 440-yard dash at the 1968 and 1969 MHSAA track and field championships.
- Rod Jones, former NFL player for the Cincinnati Bengals.
- Greg Kelser (1975), teamed with Lansing Everett's Earvin "Magic" Johnson to lead Michigan State University over Indiana State University in the 1979 National Collegiate Athletic Association championship basketball game. Kelser also enjoyed a successful career in the National Basketball Association; he is currently employed as a network television sports announcer.
- Fred Kotenko, Ralph & Russ Terrana (1960), musicians who were founding members of The Sunliners; the group eventually became known as Rare Earth, of Motown Records fame.
- Susan Lutzo (1975), athlete, swam to an eighth-place finish in the 50-yard butterfly at the inaugural MHSAA Girls' Swimming and Diving Championships (1972); her result was the best by a DPSSAL swimmer at the groundbreaking event. Lutzo was also a two-time MHSAA championship qualifier in the 100-yard butterfly and 200-yard individual medley (1973, 1974).
- Kevin Machemer (1976), three-time MHSAA finalist in springboard diving; he won a silver medal while representing HFHS at the 1976 championships. Machemer would later earn NCAA All-American recognition at Michigan State University and the University of Michigan. Kevin was also a member of the 1980 US Olympic Team; but the US boycotted the Games at Moscow.
- Lenda Murray (1980), champion female bodybuilder. As an eight-time winner of the Ms. Olympia title, Murray once reigned as the preeminent performer in her sport.
- Ron Nightingale (1969) the only male swimmer from Ford High to make finals at the Michigan High School Athletic Association championships; Nightingale finished sixth in the 50-yard freestyle at the 1969 state meet.
- Cheryl Pruitt (1987), won two state titles in the 400 meter dash; taking first place in her event at the 1985 and 1987 MHSAA track and field championships.
- Rodney Saulsberry, professional announcer and voice-over performer.
- Larry VerBerg (1977) and Athleen Bowles (1977), won individual state titles at the 1977 MHSAA track and field finals; VerBerg took first place in the 880-yard run, and Bowles sprinted her way to a gold medal in the 100-yard dash.
- Charlie Williams, former NFL player for the Dallas Cowboys.
