= A National Disgrace =

- Dan Rather Reports episode
- Episode no.: Season 6 Episode 17
- Directed by: Steven Tyler
- Presented by: Dan Rather
- Cinematography by: Lucian Read
- Editing by: Carla Ruff
- Production code: 617
- Original air date: May 10, 2011
- Running time: 105 minutes

Episode chronology
← Previous "6.16: The Best of the Best"	Next → "6.18: The App Bubble"

"A National Disgrace", episode #617 of Dan Rather Reports, is a two-hour television report about the Detroit Public Schools (DPS), in Detroit, Michigan, that aired on HDNet (today AXS TV) on May 10, 2011. Presented by journalist Dan Rather, this episode was part of his investigative documentary series. It explores a political struggle between the Detroit Board of Education, the governing body of DPS, and Robert Bobb, the emergency manager appointed by the State of Michigan after the city declared bankruptcy.

The filming took about 18 months and included interviews with DPS school board members, teachers and administrators, and students and parents. The production filmed a Detroit Board of Education meeting in which the board announced that superintendent Connie Calloway, who held the position for 18 months, was fired.

According to Rather, the failure of DPS is a failure of a top-down educational system. He argued that the problems are related to public schools in the entire United States and are not limited to Detroit.

== Background ==
At the time of the program, residents of the city of Detroit had a functional illiteracy rate of 50%. The title originates from a statement made about Detroit public schools by Arne Duncan, the U.S. Secretary of Education.

== Content ==
The report explores the problems associated with the city's struggles with declining economy, poverty of many residents, and how the schools are performing. It states that in 2009 the DPS district scored the lowest ever National Assessment of Educational Progress (NAEP) test results. Henry Ford High School is featured in the program.

== Release and reception ==
Jonathan Oosting of MLive said that "Rather's report is sure to upset some residents—and of course local leaders—tired of seeing Detroit in the national media for all the wrong reasons." After the documentary was aired, Bobb accused Rather of ignoring efforts by the Bobb-led administration to reform the district. Bobb argued that it "grossly and completely neglects an entire year or more of transformative efforts to change the system." DPS board president Anthony Adams also criticized the documentary, saying that it "really bashes the city, bashes the district, doesn't really talk about the accomplishments and the great strides that we've made."
