= 177 Franklin Street =

Commercial building in Manhattan, New York

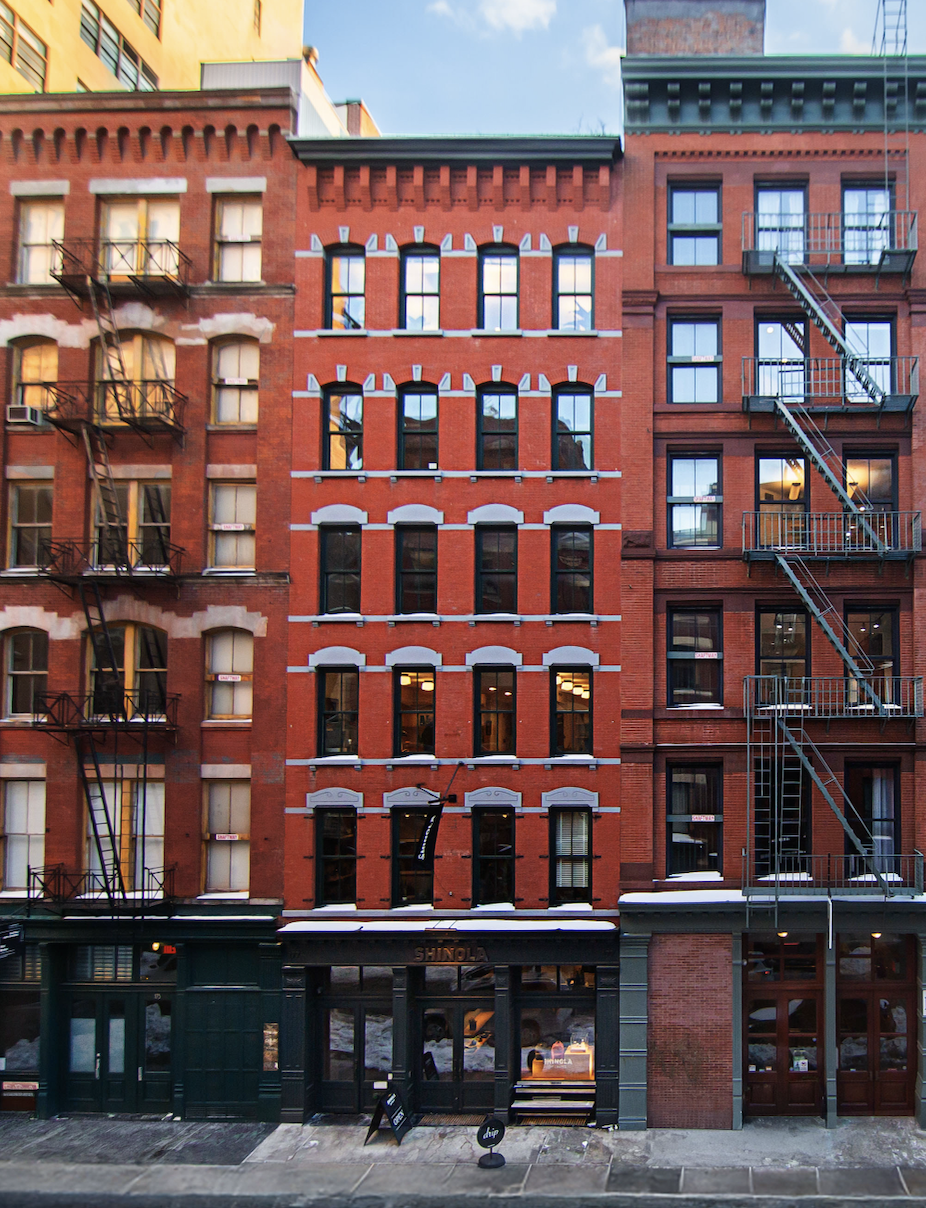
- 177 Franklin Street in 2025
- Interactive map of the 177 Franklin Street area

General information
- Type: Commercial
- Location: Manhattan, New York, United States
- Coordinates: 40°43′8.976″N 74°00′34.056″W
- Construction started: 1887
- Completed: 1888; 138 years ago
- Renovated: 2018; 8 years ago

Technical details
- Floor count: 6

Design and construction
- Architect: Frederick Jenth
- Developer: William Grupe

177 Franklin Street is a historic six-story commercial building located on Franklin Street between Hudson and Greenwich streets in the TriBeCa neighborhood of Manhattan in New York City. Frederick Jenth designed the building for William Grupe; construction started in 1887 and was finished the next year. The structure was originally designed as a five-story building; a sixth story was added in 1890.

The building has a neo-Grec façade composed of a one-story base and a five-story upper section. Some surviving historic features include a pressed metal cornice, prominent brick-and-stone lintels, a brick corbel table, wood sash windows, and cast-iron piers from the Lindsay, Graff & Megquier foundry, as indicated on two clear foundry marks.

== History ==
After the building's construction was finalized in 1887, William Grupe retained ownership of the building from its completion in 1889 until 1910, when he sold it to famed politician Peter G. Gerry, which Gerry later sold to a building tenant in 1919 as he decided to further pursue his political career.

Throughout the beginning of the twentieth century, the building was occupied by Newark Cheese Company and Sante Foods. The China Brilliance Corporation began occupying the space in the late 20th century.

Glad Tidings Tabernacle bought the building in 2008, with the hope of moving its headquarters to the address. After spending millions to renovate, the Tribeca Community Board refused to allow the church to install a 6-foot-tall, 30-inch-wide copper cross, prompting the church to sell the building in 2011 to Steven Alan’s Bedrock Brands in an effort to re-launch Tom Kartsotis’s lifestyle brand, Shinola. Two years later, Shinola opened its New York flagship office in the building, where it remains today.

In April 2020, during the height of the COVID-19 lockdowns, 177 Franklin Street was sold once again, historically making it the only recorded mid-market investment sale in New York City that month.
