= Filson (company) =

American privately owned company

C.C. Filson Co.
- Type: Private
- Industry: Luggage manufacturing; Clothing manufacturing; Retail; Wholesale
- Predecessor: C.C. Filson's Pioneer Alaska Clothing and Blanket Manufacturers
- Founded: 1897; 129 years ago
- Founder: Clinton C. Filson
- Headquarters: Seattle, Washington, United States
- Number of locations: 15 company-operated stores and 2 manufacturing locations
- Area served: Worldwide
- Key people: Paolo Corinaldesi (CEO)
- Products: Luggage; Apparel
- Services: Clothing repair; Clothing rewaxing
- Parent: Bedrock Manufacturing Co.
- Website: filson.com

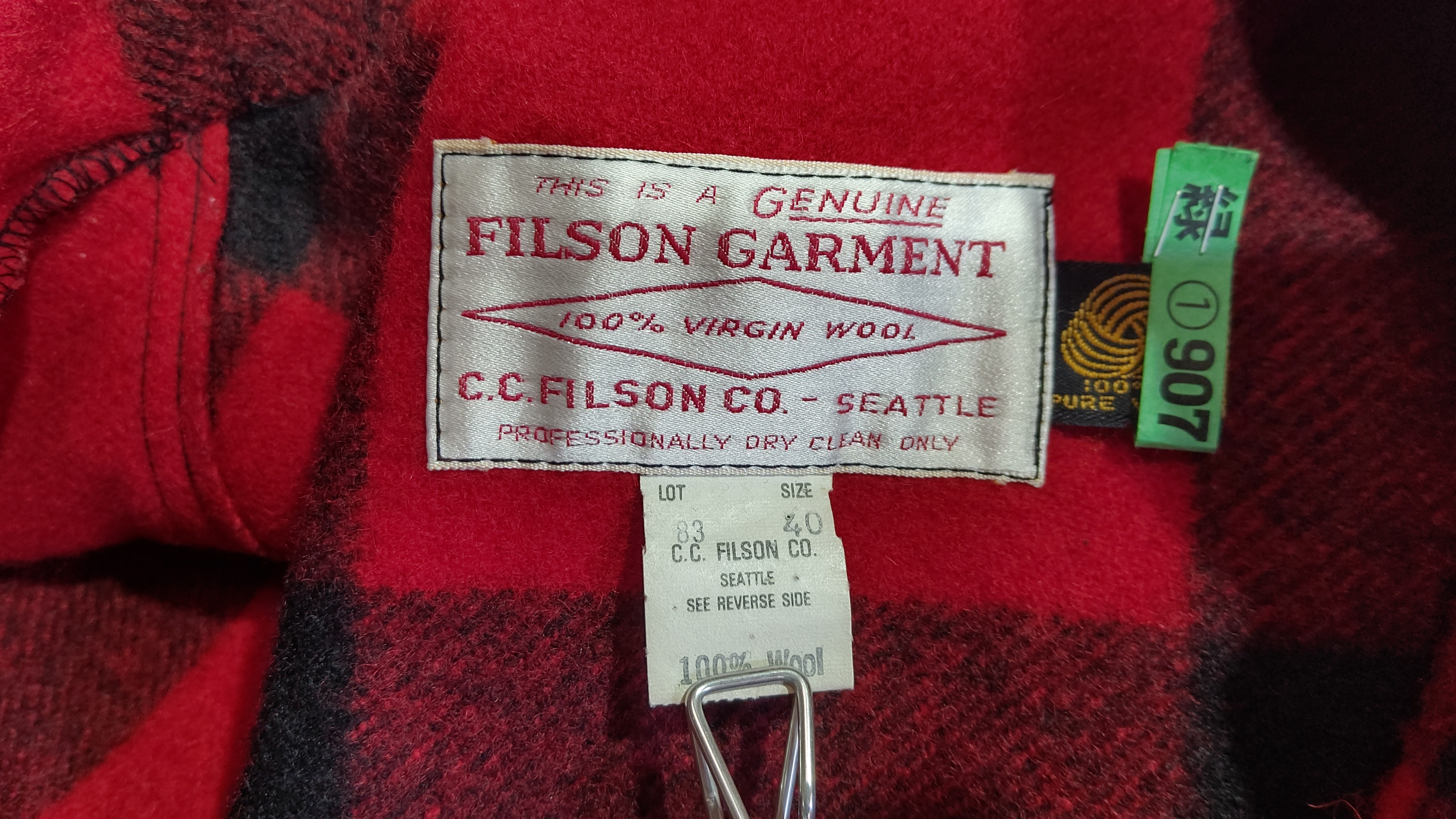
Filson Double Mackinaw Tag

C.C. Filson is an American privately owned outfitter and manufacturer of goods for outdoor enthusiasts. The company, based in Seattle, Washington, designs, manufactures, distributes and sells men's and women's outdoor clothing, accessories and luggage. Filson sells its products via company-owned retail stores, catalogs and the Filson website as well as through authorized dealers in the United States and international distributors. The company was originally established in Seattle in 1897 as C.C. Filson's Pioneer Alaska Clothing and Blanket Manufacturers to meet the needs of prospectors passing through Seattle on their way to the Klondike Gold Rush; as of 2012 the brand is owned by Fossil Group founder Tom Kartsotis, who also created Shinola Detroit.

== History ==
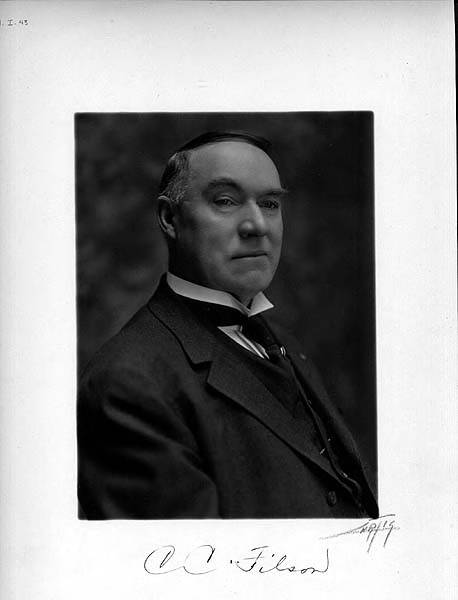
C.C. Filson, c.1917

Clinton C. Filson (born 1850), a former Nebraska homesteader and railroad conductor for the Chicago, Milwaukee, St. Paul and Pacific Railroad, arrived in the Northwest in the early 1890s, initially settling in Kirkland, Washington, where he invested in property near Peter Kirk's proposed iron works and opened a hardware store in a brick building he co-owned with Seattle customs inspector A.T. Timmerman. He would also serve as the town's postmaster in 1894. Two years later after Kirkland's plans fell through he relocated to Seattle where he operated a small loggers' outfitting store, the Seattle Woolen House, at 903 1st Avenue, where the Federal Office Building currently stands.

To meet the needs of prospectors passing through Seattle on their way to the Klondike Gold Rush, C.C. Filson founded C.C. Filson's Pioneer Alaska Clothing and Blanket Manufacturers in 1897. The company supplied prospectors with a variety of outdoor gear including clothing, blankets, boots and sleeping bags. After the gold rush ended around 1899, Filson shifted to providing gear for outdoor oriented activities and occupations including hunting, fishing and logging, among others. Never having retired, Filson died in December 1919 and ownership of the company was handed over to his widow Winifred and nephew George Stroble.

=== Ownership and leadership ===
Filson remained under the control of the Filson family until 1970, when they sold their interest to a former distributor of Filson products to independent dealers in Alaska. Stan Kohls, a skiwear entrepreneur, purchased the company in 1981. Kohls expanded the product line from 35 items to 250 items, drawing from the company's archive or designing each new item himself. Kohls attempted to preserve the authenticity of the products by not using modern materials like Velcro.

On January 1, 2005, Los Angeles, California-based private-equity group Brentwood Associates and former Polo Ralph Lauren Corporation executive Doug Williams acquired C.C. Filson, with Kohls maintaining a minority ownership interest and a seat on the board. Brentwood Associates and Williams renamed the company Filson Holdings and named Williams the Chief Executive Officer. Williams hoped to expand the brand's sales by introducing casual wear and selling to new customers based on Filson's reputation for ruggedness and quality. In 2006, Filson made Bill Kulczycki, a former Patagonia executive, CEO. In 2010, Mark A. Korros became CEO.

In 2012, Brentwood Associates sold Filson Holdings, Inc. to another Dallas-based private-equity firm, Bedrock Manufacturing Co., for an undisclosed amount. Alan Kirk was appointed CEO of Filson in 2013. In June 2013, the company opened an extensive new manufacturing facility on 1st Avenue South in Seattle's SODO manufacturing district, more than doubling capacity and by year end, more than 100 new jobs were created in production. The company manufactured luggage, apparel and accessories in three company-owned locations in the USA.

Former CEO Steve Bock left the company in early 2019, and was replaced by Rollen Jones. Following Jones' move in the following year to his current role as CFO and a brief interim return by Bock, former global strategist Paolo Corinaldesi of international retail group WP Lavori was appointed to the position, and was the standing CEO. In January 2025, Bedrock recruited Tim Bantle from Eddie Bauer as President at Filson.

==== Offshoring ====
Under Bedrock's leadership, Filson has reduced positions in its Seattle and Kent manufacturing facilities and shifted more production overseas. In 2023, plans were announced to outsource most remaining Seattle production to a garment contractor in Los Angeles. The percentage of products manufactured in the U.S. has been reduced from 90% in 2015 to 35% in 2025, according to Filson. Over the same period, the company's Seattle-area workforce has been reduced from 369 employees to under 100.

== Retail locations ==
In addition to the company's retail website, Filson features flagship locations in Seattle, Washington, and Union Square, New York City, as well as brick-and-mortar stores in Portland, Oregon; San Francisco, California; Plano, Texas; Edina, Minnesota; Boston, Massachusetts Washington, D.C.; Ballard, Seattle; and Naperville, Illinois. Outside the US, there are stores in Vancouver, British Columbia, Canada and Toronto, Ontario, Canada. in Europe there are two retail locations in Italy one in Milan and one in Cortina d'Ampezzo.

Filson maintains one outlet store, located in Eagan, Minnesota.

== Modern product line ==
In 1991, Filson revived its line of bridle leather-trimmed canvas luggage. In 1998, Filson opened a flagship retail store near Seattle's Safeco Field. In 2008, Filson introduced a line of women's clothing. In 2010, Filson partnered with Levi Strauss & Co. to produce a collection of jackets, shirts, caps and bags called "Levi's Workwear by Filson." Filson also produces a limited-run line under the "Filson Workshop" brand, often utilizing recycled materials to handcraft bespoke products in their Seattle workshop.

== See also ==
- Mackinaw jacket
