= Shinola (disambiguation) =

Shinola is a defunct American brand of shoe polish.

Shinola may also refer to:

== Brands ==
- Shinola (retail company), an American luxury goods retailer

== Music ==
- Shinola (Energy Orchard album), a 1993 album by Energy Orchard
- Shinola (John Scofield album), a 1981 live album by John Scofield
- Shinola, Vol. 1, a 2005 album by Ween
- "Shinola", a 2008 song by Dolly Parton from Backwoods Barbie

== See also ==
- Shynola, a group of visual artists from the UK
