= Gregory Herman =

American fashion designer

Greg Herman
- Born: Gregory Herman; June 19, 1972 (age 53); Los Angeles, California, U.S.
- Occupations: Fashion Designer, Brand, Producer

Gregory Herman is an American fashion designer, brand, and producer. He is best known for his luxury line of handbags and collections of interior products. In addition to his work in design, Herman, from 2011-2012 was signed to a first look deal to develop television and feature film concepts with Shaftesbury Films, and later from 2013-15 with Starz Media | Film Roman. In 2016, Herman signed another first look deal with Lakeshore Films, and partnered up with Drew Barrymore of Flower Films and Universal Cable Productions (UCP) to co-develop BLOOMS, a one-hour dramedy series for MTV Productions. Herman is currently represented by the talent agency William Morris Endeavor.

== Early life ==
Born June 19, 1972, Herman was raised by his mother Judy Herman in Los Angeles, California. He is of Hungarian descent and identifies himself both as American and Hungarian.

His mother, Judy, operated a small personal agency in Beverly Hills. Her clients included Frank Sinatra, Elizabeth Taylor, Ellen Degeneres, Dr. Dre, D.J. Steve Aoki, Steve Jobs, Jennifer Aniston, and many others. For over twenty years, Judy was entrusted in taking care of their personal lives and homes. Unfortunately, Greg's sister, Lori, was diagnosed with stage four Hodgkins lymphoma and thyroid cancer. Lori survived, and in a chance meeting with Erin Brockovich later came to spearhead a lawsuit against the city of Beverly Hills and Venoco. This case and Lori's struggles gained international media attention and was chronicled in Julia Stoops's book Parts per Million.

Herman, after graduating from Beverly Hills High School, went on to study theatre and modern drama at University of Cambridge and later earned a degree in Anthropology from The University of California, Los Angeles (UCLA).

== Career ==
Upon graduating college, Herman was crashing on friends' sofas, when he started Greg Herman Handbags in 1997. Having traded medical school for the fashion industry, Herman was determined to alter the way handbags were designed and sold. His first launch collection was a modernistic look incorporating suede and tapestry fabric. He left Los Angeles and headed to New York to pursue a career in fashion, specifically handbag design. The brand formally debuted that same year with the aid of then friend and muse Rachel Rosenzweig aka Rachel Zoe, the Steven Alan Showroom, and Jane Pratt, founder of Jane Magazine, all of who helped shepherd the collections throughout the New York fashion scene—introducing Herman to both buyers and editors at W Magazine, Cosmopolitan, and Vogue. Herman went on to become a global brand creating exclusive handbag collections for Barneys New York, House of Fraser, Scoop, Henri Bendel, Harvey Nichols, and Neiman Marcus. In 2000, Herman developed one of the first online handbag collections with Girlshop.com, the first dedicated online fashion portal.

In 1998, Herman befriended Brittany Murphy, Alyssa Milano, Christina Applegate, and Sharon Stone. In 2017, Greg met artist and photographer Orit Harpaz and together they created the Weirdoh Birds brand- a collection made up of chic and groovy wallcoverings, homegoods, and other wares. Today, the Greg Herman brand, House of Herman, and Bands of Misfits are operated by MGC collective, a collaborative design group focused on curating collections and setting up strategic creative partnerships in the fields of accessories, home design products, hospitality, jewelry, apparel, and fine art.

== Personal life ==
Herman resides and maintains his base of operations both in Los Angeles and New York.
