= Fisher and New Center Buildings =

- U.S. National Register of Historic Places
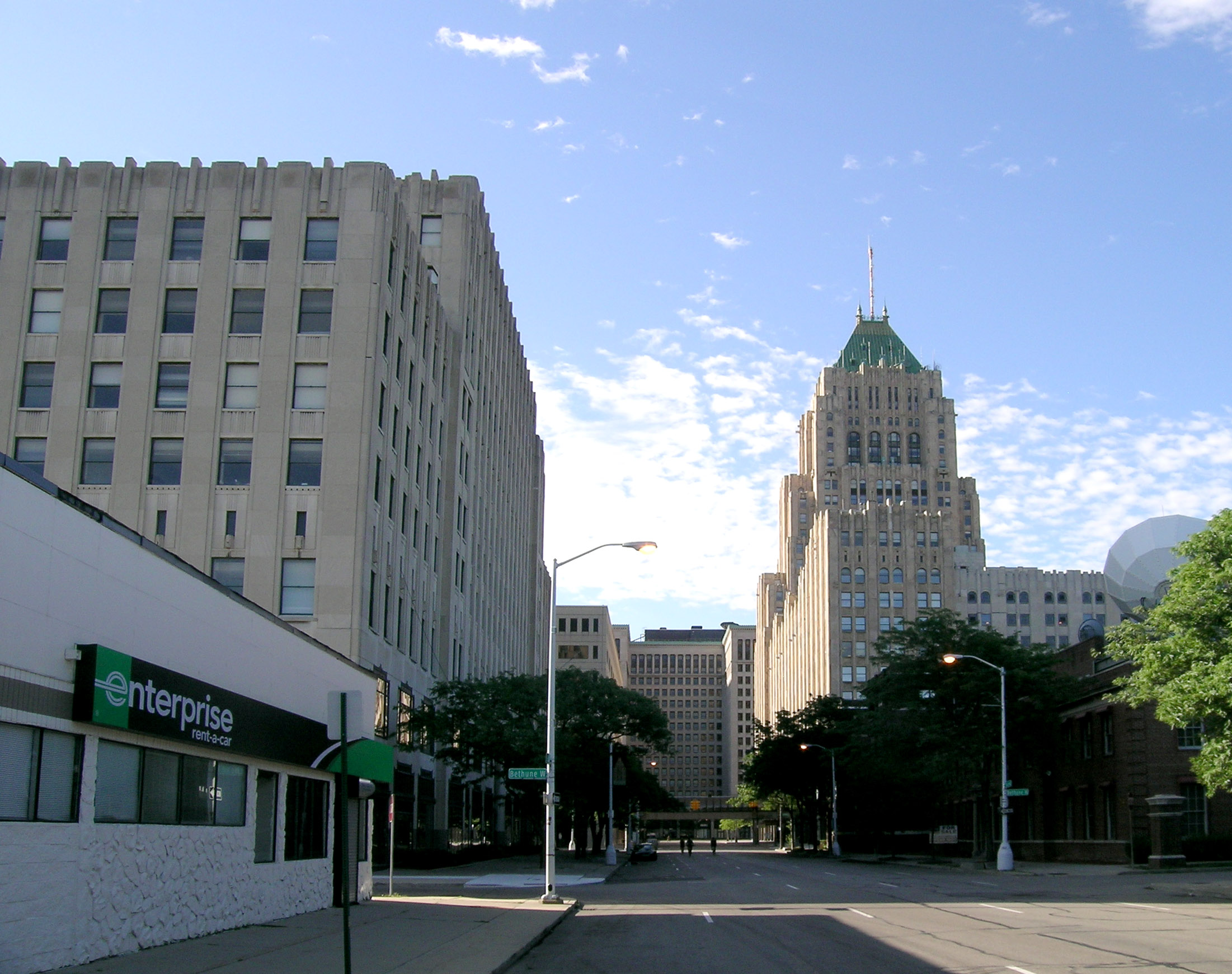
- Albert Kahn Building (left) and Fisher Building (right) in Detroit. Cadillac Place is in the background.
- Interactive map
- Location: Detroit, Michigan
- Coordinates: 42°22′11″N 83°4′39″W
- Built: 1927 and 1930
- Architect: Albert Kahn
- Architectural style: Art Deco
- NRHP reference No.: 80001922
- Added to NRHP: October 14, 1980

The Fisher Building and the New Center Building are two office buildings located adjacent to one another at 7430 2nd Avenue and 3011 West Grand Boulevard in the New Center area of Detroit, Michigan. They share a 1980 listing on the National Register of Historic Places.

== Fisher Building ==
The Fisher Building is a 30-story office building designed by Albert Kahn. It was built in 1928, constructed primarily of limestone, granite, and marble. It was designated a National Historic Landmark on June 29, 1989, has been nicknamed Detroit's largest art object. The building was to house the automotive company Fisher Body of the Fisher brothers (Frederick, Charles, William, Lawrence, Edward, Alfred and Howard), and is widely considered Kahn's greatest achievement. The year of its construction, the Fisher building was honored by the Architectural League of New York as the year's most beautiful commercial structure. The opulent three-story barrel vaulted lobby is constructed with 40 different kinds of marble, decorated by Hungarian artist Géza Maróti, and is highly regarded by architects.

== New Center Building ==
The New Center Building was also designed by Kahn and built by the Fisher brothers. The ten-story building is architecturally similar to the Fisher Building, and the two are connected by a tunnel. The building was originally designed to house office and retail space, but as of 2004 houses only offices, including those of Albert Kahn and Associates. The building was renamed the Albert Kahn Building in 1988.

== Significance ==
The Fisher Building was built in 1927–1928; the New Center Building followed in 1930–31. The two buildings are the only structures built by the Fishers in the New Center; although more buildings were planned, the Great Depression and World War II intervened. However, the Fisher and New Center Buildings as a pair are an architecturally significant complex demonstrating some of the finest craftsmanship and artistry in Art Deco style buildings. The two buildings were added to the National Register of Historic Places on October 14, 1980; the Fisher Building was designated a National Historic Landmark on June 29, 1989.
