= Shecky =

Shecky or variants can refer to:

- Shecky Greene (1926 – 2023), an American comedian
- Shecky's, an American media company
- Shecky Chucklestein, a fictional character played by Patton Oswalt in the sitcom Squidbillies (2006)
