= Steven Alan =

American fashion designer

Steven Alan (born Steven Alan Grossman) is an American fashion designer from New York City. His eponymous brand is sold online and in physical retail stores in New York, Japan and South Korea. As a multi-brand retailer, Steven Alan was the first U.S. retailer to carry Acne Studios, Maison Kitsuné, Engineered Garments and Mansur Gavriel.

== History ==
Opening his first New York City retail store and showroom in 1994, the company produced and sold men’s and women’s wear. The company also operated its own multi-brand retail stores, where it sold the works of other designers such as handbag designer Gregory Herman and others.

By 1999, Alan launched his own line of ready-to-wear standards, including his now-signature "Reverse Seam" button-down, chinos, and cotton dresses in colorful plaids, stripes, and chambray.

Having expanded to six eponymous New York locations, in 2008 the brand opened three shops in Southern California. On November 11, 2011, its first San Francisco, CA boutique opened in Hayes Valley. Alan has also designed collections for Urban Outfitters, Uniqlo, Keds, and a collection of khakis and sportswear for Dockers.

On April 29, 2011, Women's Wear Daily reported that Steven Alan had sold a minority share in his company to Fossil, Inc. and Shinola Detroit founder Tom Kartsotis. Kartsotis and a group of investors are acquiring American-made fashion brands under the name Bedrock Manufacturing Corp. In 2016, Steven Alan split from Bedrock.

In 2017, the brand had closed all but three New York City stores, and focused on its online presence. Following the COVID-19 pandemic, the brand did not have any physical stores.

In 2024, Steven Alan opened a new store on West 20th Street in Chelsea, Manhattan.

== Reception ==
Alan's designs and collections have gained critical attention from British Vogue, Teen Vogue, Nylon, New York magazine, the New York Times, Los Angeles Times, and others. The fashion-industry trade journal Women's Wear Daily reported "Steven Alan has become a household name for hip consumers, including actresses Mary-Kate Olsen and Natalie Portman."

== Awards and honors ==
In 2008 Alan was nominated for the GQ/CFDA menswear designer of the year award.

== See also ==
- Ralph Lauren
- Bill Blass
- Sid Mashburn
- Billy Reid
- Todd Snyder
