= Eric J. Hill =

American architect

Eric J. Hill is a Professor of Practice in Architecture at the University of Michigan. He earned his bachelor's degree in Architecture in 1970 from the University of Pennsylvania, a Masters in Architecture from Harvard in 1972, and a Ph.D in Architecture from the University of Pennsylvania in 1976. He was a Marshall Research Fellow at Denmark's Royal Academy of Fine Arts from 1972 to 1973. He is the co-author, along with John Gallagher, of AIA Detroit: The American Institute of Architects Guide to Detroit Architecture. He has served as a Director of Urban Planning and Design at the Detroit firm of Albert Kahn Associates. He has participated in projects such as the promenade on the Detroit International Riverfront, the Detroit Opera House restoration, and the Cadillac Place redevelopment. He has received numerous awards from the American Institute of Architects.
