= Girlshop =

Fashion e-commerce company

- Founded: June 1998; 28 years ago
- Defunct: 2007
- Owner: Laura Eisman

Girlshop Inc. was the pioneering fashion e-commerce company behind girlshop.com, the first website for indie-designer, trend making style. Girlshop.com was launched in 1998 by graphic designer turned entrepreneur Laura Eisman (previously Creative Director of iVillage).

== Background ==
Eisman opened Girlshop in June 1998 with $10,000 of her own money. A month later The New York Times issued the company's first write up. What followed was an influx of traffic to the site. To handle the sudden success, Eisman teamed up with her then boyfriend Todd Richter who designed a database system, solidifying Girlshop as an indie fashion retail staple in NYC.

At its peak, Girlshop Inc. was receiving more than half a million visitors per month and shipping ** orders per month, resulting in a 5 million dollar business. In 2005, Girlshop Inc. announced the opening of a physical store front in the Meatpacking District.

Girlshop was featured in the romance novel A Match Made on Madison by Dee Davis.

Girlshop published a book, The Girlshop Guide to NYC Shopping, in collaboration with their fashion rival Shecky's.

Girlshop's founder, Laura Eisman, has been featured and quoted in The Wall Street Journal, Forbes, Entrepreneur, Bloomberg, Fox News, NY Daily News, USA Today, Advertising Age, Adweek, National Real Estate Investor, Gift Shop, and Fashion Incubator, among others.

Due to increased competition and big-scale fashion retailers entering the e-commerce space, Girlshop's storefront closed its physical and virtual doors in 2007.
