= Argonaut Building =

Historic place in Detroit, Michigan

- General Motors Research Laboratory
- U.S. National Register of Historic Places
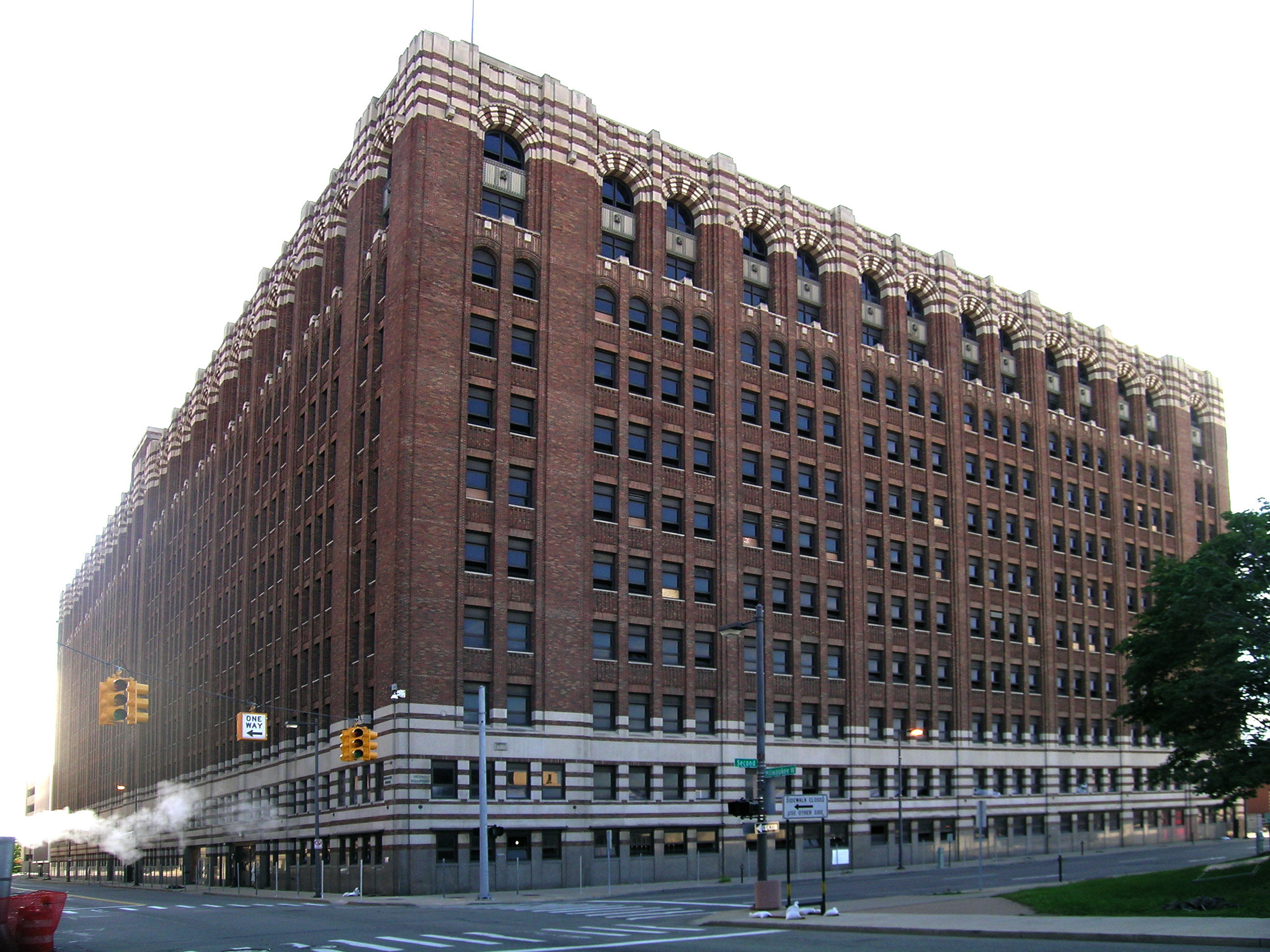
- The Argonaut Building, taken from the West
- Interactive map
- Location: 485 West Milwaukee Avenue; Detroit, Michigan
- Coordinates: 42°22′5″N 83°4′30″W
- Built: 1928
- Architect: Albert Kahn
- Architectural style: Early Commercial
- NRHP reference No.: 05000713
- Added to NRHP: July 22, 2005

The Argonaut Building, renamed in 2009 the A. Alfred Taubman Center for Design Education (originally the Argonaut, or General Motors Research Laboratory), is a large office building located at 485 West Milwaukee Avenue in the New Center area of Detroit, Michigan, across the street from Cadillac Place GM's former corporate headquarter office. It was listed on the National Register of Historic Places in 2005.

== Description ==
The building was constructed in two phases between 1928 and 1936, with the finished structure forming an L shape. The high-rise is eleven floors tall, with an additional basement level. The height to the main roof is 42.7 meters (140 feet), and 56.3 metres (180 feet) to the top of the elevator tower. The 275-unit structure is an Art Deco building, and uses primarily red-brown brick and limestone in its materials.

The building is fifteen bays wide along Milwaukee, and eight bays wide along Second. Building corners have wide brick piers, with narrower windows separating the bays along the facade. The windows in each bay are slightly recessed, containing double-hung windows, with ornamental cast iron spandrel panels on the top two floors. Window on the eleventh and ninth floors have rounded tops. Two entry doors are placed along the main (Milwaukee) facade, one in each of the building phases.

== History and renovations ==
In 1927, General Motors' real estate division, Argonaut Realty Corporation, commissioned Albert Kahn to design a research laboratory for the company. The building was constructed across Milwaukee from the General Motors Headquarters (now Cadillac Place), and intended for use by General Motors' internal research staff. In 1936, an addition was constructed, providing an entrance on Milwaukee. Significant developments undertaken in the building include the design of the Hydramatic transmission and Harley Earl's vehicle designs from the Art and Color Section.

The building was used for GM's research staff until the General Motors Technical Center was constructed in 1956. At that time, Argonaut Realty moved into the building. When GM moved its headquarters to the Renaissance Center in the early 2000s, Argonaut moved out of the building, and it stood vacant for a few years.

In 2007, General Motors donated it to the College for Creative Studies. It is in use as both a charter high school for art-centric children, as well as CCS's planned graduate program. On top of these uses, CCS moved all of their Design based Undergraduate programs to this location, providing the space for a larger student body, and subsequently larger program. In addition, the building houses approximately 300 in student housing. It is also a school; Henry Ford Academy: School for Creative Studies, having the sixth through twelfth grade. The $145 million renovation was completed in fall 2009. In 2012, Shinola renovated the fifth floor and turned it into their corporate office as well as a watch factory and bicycle workshop.
