= Skagen Denmark =

Watch and jewelry brand

Skagen
- Type: Subsidiary
- Industry: Fashion
- Founded: 1989; 37 years ago
- Headquarters: Richardson, Texas, US,
- Key people: Charlotte Jorst (Co-founder, President); Henrik Jorst (Co-Founder); Steen Albrechtslund (Group Managing Director)
- Products: Wristwatches and jewelry
- Parent: Fossil Group
- Website: skagen.com

Skagen, also known as Skagen Denmark, is an American contemporary watch and accessories brand owned by Skagen Designs Ltd., a subsidiary of Fossil Group. Inspired by Danish design and named after Skagen, Denmark's northernmost town, the brand's product lines include watches and jewelry.

The company was founded in 1989 in New York City by Henrik and Charlotte Jorst. Following several relocations, Skagen Designs Ltd. was acquired by Fossil in 2012 for approximately US$237 million. While global operations are overseen from Fossil's headquarters in Richardson, Texas, the brand maintains regional offices in Denmark and Hong Kong.

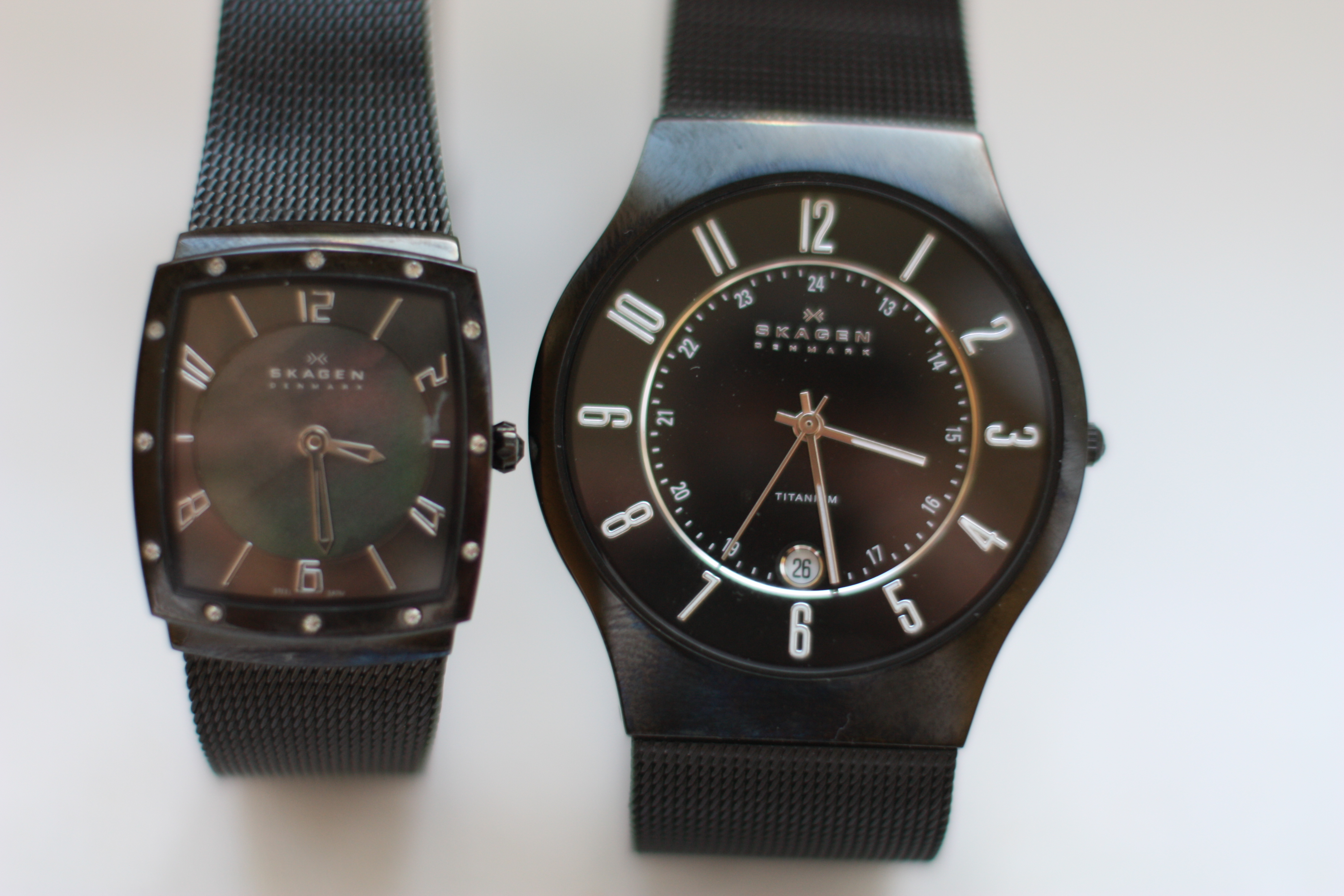
Wristwatches from Skagen

== History ==
The company was founded in 1989 in New York by Henrik and Charlotte Jorst. The couple had moved from Denmark to the United States in 1986 when Henrik was appointed the U.S. sales manager for the Carlsberg brewery. Deciding to start their own business, they initially acted as U.S. representatives for a Danish manufacturer of corporate gift watches and for exclusive Jacob Jensen designer watches.

Seeking to manufacture watches at a more accessible price point, the Jorsts partnered with Comtech Watches, a Danish-owned manufacturer with production facilities in Hong Kong, and began designing their own timepieces. They debuted these designs at a New York corporate gift fair in 1991. Following the event, they launched their own brand, Skagen Denmark. The brand's name was inspired by the Danish fishing village of Skagen, located at the northernmost tip of the Jutland peninsula. The company's symbol consists of opposing angles representing the meeting of the Skagerrak and Kattegat seas at Skagen's coastline.

In 1992, the company began selling watches under its own brand, reaching US$800,000 in annual sales. The following year, the Jorsts relocated the business from New York to Lake Tahoe, and later to Reno, Nevada. In 1995, the Bloomingdale's department store began carrying their watches. By 1998, Skagen had opened a European distribution office in Denmark and was listed among the fastest-growing privately owned U.S. companies, with annual sales nearing US$30 million.

Throughout the late 1990s and 2000s, the company expanded its distribution across Europe, the Middle East, and Asia. By 2005, annual sales had reached US$70 million. The company continued its international growth by establishing a regional office in Hong Kong in 2007.

In 2012, Fossil, Inc. acquired Skagen Designs Ltd. for approximately US$237 million in stock and cash. Following the acquisition, the brand's operations were integrated into Fossil's headquarters in Richardson, Texas, while maintaining a global physical presence, including concept stores in Japan (Tokyo, Osaka, and Nagoya) and Taiwan.

In October 2025, as part of a restructuring plan in the UK, Fossil sought US recognition and placed its US business in Chapter 15 bankruptcy.
