= Cadillac Place =

Government offices in Detroit, Michigan

- Former names: General Motors Building

General information
- Type: Government offices
- Architectural style: Neo-classical
- Location: 3044 West Grand Boulevard (between Cass and Second Streets); Detroit, Michigan
- Coordinates: 42.3686°N 83.0756°W
- Construction started: June 2, 1919
- Completed: 1922; 104 years ago
- Renovated: 2002

Height
- Roof: 220 ft (67 m)

Technical details
- Material: Masonry and stone
- Floor count: 15
- Floor area: 1,395,000 sq ft (129,600 m^{2})
- Lifts/elevators: 31

Design and construction
- Architects: Albert Kahn (1869–1942)
- Main contractor: Thompson-Starrett Co.

Other information
- Public transit: QLine Grand Boulevard; DDOT 16, 23, 42
- General Motors Building
- U.S. National Register of Historic Places
- U.S. National Historic Landmark
- Area: 3.7 acres (1.5 ha)
- NRHP reference No.: 78001520

Significant dates
- Added to NRHP: June 2, 1978
- Designated NHL: June 2, 1978

Cadillac Place, formerly the General Motors Building, is a landmark high-rise office complex located at 3044 West Grand Boulevard (between Cass and Second Streets), in the New Center area of Detroit, Michigan, United States. It was renamed for the Royal French founder of the earlier French / British settlements of the Fort Detroit and subsequent City of Detroit, by Antoine Laumet de La Mothe, sieur de Cadillac (1658–1730). It is a National Historic Landmark in Michigan, listed in 1985.

== History ==
=== General Motors Building ===
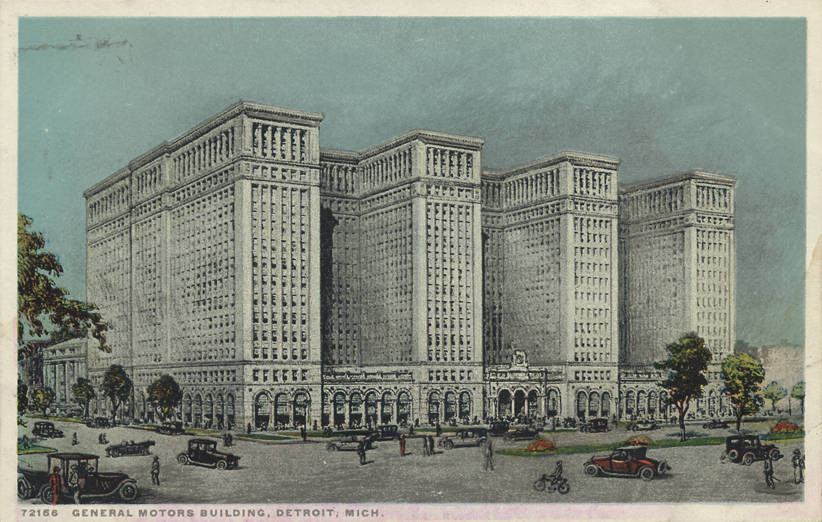
General Motors Building in a 1920s illustration

After much pressure by the General Motors Corporation Board of Directors, William C. Durant (1861–1947), agreed in 1919 to construct a permanent headquarters in Detroit for the company he formed a decade earlier in 1908. The corporation then purchased the block between Cass and Second Streets, facing on West Grand Boulevard and removed the earlier 48 smaller longtime structures from the site to begin work. Albert Kahn (1869–1942), was hired as architect to design the huge massive multi-winged structure, then one of the largest office buildings in the United States.

Groundbreaking was held June 2, 1919, and the Cass Avenue wing was ready for occupancy in November 1920 while the remainder of the building was under construction. The building was originally to be named for Durant, but an internal power struggle led to his ouster two years later in 1921 and the structure was then renamed the General Motors Building. However, the initial "D" had already been carved above the main entrance and in several other places on the building where they remain visible today.

The structure was completed in 1922, and served as General Motors world headquarters from 1923 until 2001. It is approximately 2 miles (3.2 km) to the southwest of the Detroit/Hamtramck Assembly, where Cadillac luxury automobiles are currently built.

=== New Center Development ===
In 2001, GM moved the last of its employees into the Renaissance Center on the Detroit River. In 1999, General Motors transferred the property to New Center Development, Inc., a non-profit venture controlled by TrizecHahn Office Properties which acted as developer and began renovation on the upper floors which GM vacated in 2000. The Annex was constructed shortly after the main building, and in the 1940s, it was connected to the adjacent Argonaut Building with a pedestrian bridge on the fourth floor. A parking structure was constructed to the east across Cass Avenue and also connected with a pedestrian bridge. A third bridge was constructed across Grand Boulevard in the early 1980s, to connect the building with New Center One and the St. Regis Hotel.

=== Government of Michigan—Cadillac Place ===
The building now houses several Government of Michigan agencies, originally, under a 20-year lease agreement approved in 1998. At the end of the lease, the State had the option to purchase the structure for $1. In 2011, the Michigan Economic Development Corporation (State of Michigan) purchased the structure.

The building's 2000–2002 renovation, to house State offices, was one of the nation's largest historic renovation projects. When the renovation project was completed it was renamed Cadillac Place as a tribute to Detroit's founder, Antoine Laumet de La Mothe, sieur de Cadillac.

Cadillac Place currently houses over 2,000 State employees including the Michigan Court of Appeals for District I. The building's former executive office suite serves as the Detroit office for Michigan's governor and attorney general, and several Justices of the Michigan Supreme Court have offices in the building.

== Architecture ==
The building rises 15 stories to a total height of 220 feet (67 m), with the top floor at 187 ft (57 m). The building has 31 elevators. It was originally constructed with 1,200,000 sq ft (110,000 m^{2}) and expanded to 1,395,000 sq ft (130,000 m^{2}). Designated a National Historic Landmark on June 2, 1978, it is an exquisite example of Neoclassical architecture.

Designed by architect Albert Kahn, the structure consists of a two-story base with four parallel 15-story wings connecting to a central perpendicular backbone. Kahn used this design to allow sunlight and natural ventilation to reach each of the building's hundreds of individual offices. The entire building is faced in limestone and is crowned with a two-story Corinthian colonnade. In 1923, it opened as the second largest office building in the world (behind the Equitable Building in New York City).

The base of the building is surrounded by an arched colonnade supported by Ionic columns. The entrance is set into a loggia behind three arches of the Grand Boulevard facade. It intersects the arcade to form a large elevator lobby with a coffered ceiling.

=== Interiors ===
The interior features a vaulted arcade. An Italian marble from quarries near Chiampo, Vicenza, Veneto, known as tavernelle, covers its walls. Floors on the ground level are gray Tennessee marble. The arcade was originally lined by stores and an auditorium which could be used for corporate functions or by community groups. The auditorium space was later converted into an auto showroom. On the upper stories, floors are also gray Tennessee marble, while corridor walls are covered in the original white Alabama marble.

Two swimming pools were located on the lower level, one was converted into a cafeteria. Tile with a water theme gives a hint to the original use of the cafeteria space. A depressed driveway extending between Cass and Second divides the lower level of the main building from the lower level of the Annex.

When the Fisher Building was constructed across Grand Boulevard in 1927, the two were connected with an underground pedestrian tunnel that also extends north to the New Center Building. They allow employees and visitors to traverse between the three buildings without going outdoors into inclement weather.

=== Annex Building ===
To the south of the main building is the five-story Annex which served as the original home of General Motors Research Laboratory. In 1930, the laboratories moved across Milwaukee Avenue to the Art Deco Argonaut Building. For many years after the Annex housed the Chevrolet Central Office. In 2009 when the Argonaut Building was sold, a fourth-floor pedestrian bridge connecting the two was removed and the Annex facade was restored.

=== Renovation ===
Between 2000 and 2002, the General Motors Building was thoroughly renovated to house the State of Michigan offices. Architect Eric J. Hill participated in the redevelopment which was headed by Albert Kahn and Associates, the original architects. In addition to upgrading existing systems, reconfiguring some spaces and redecorating, the project installed central air conditioning. When the building was first occupied, it was cooled in the warmer months by opening windows. Later, General Motors installed window units to cool various offices and work areas. During the renovation, large-scale systems replaced almost 1,900 window units that were left when GM vacated the structure.

== Photo gallery ==
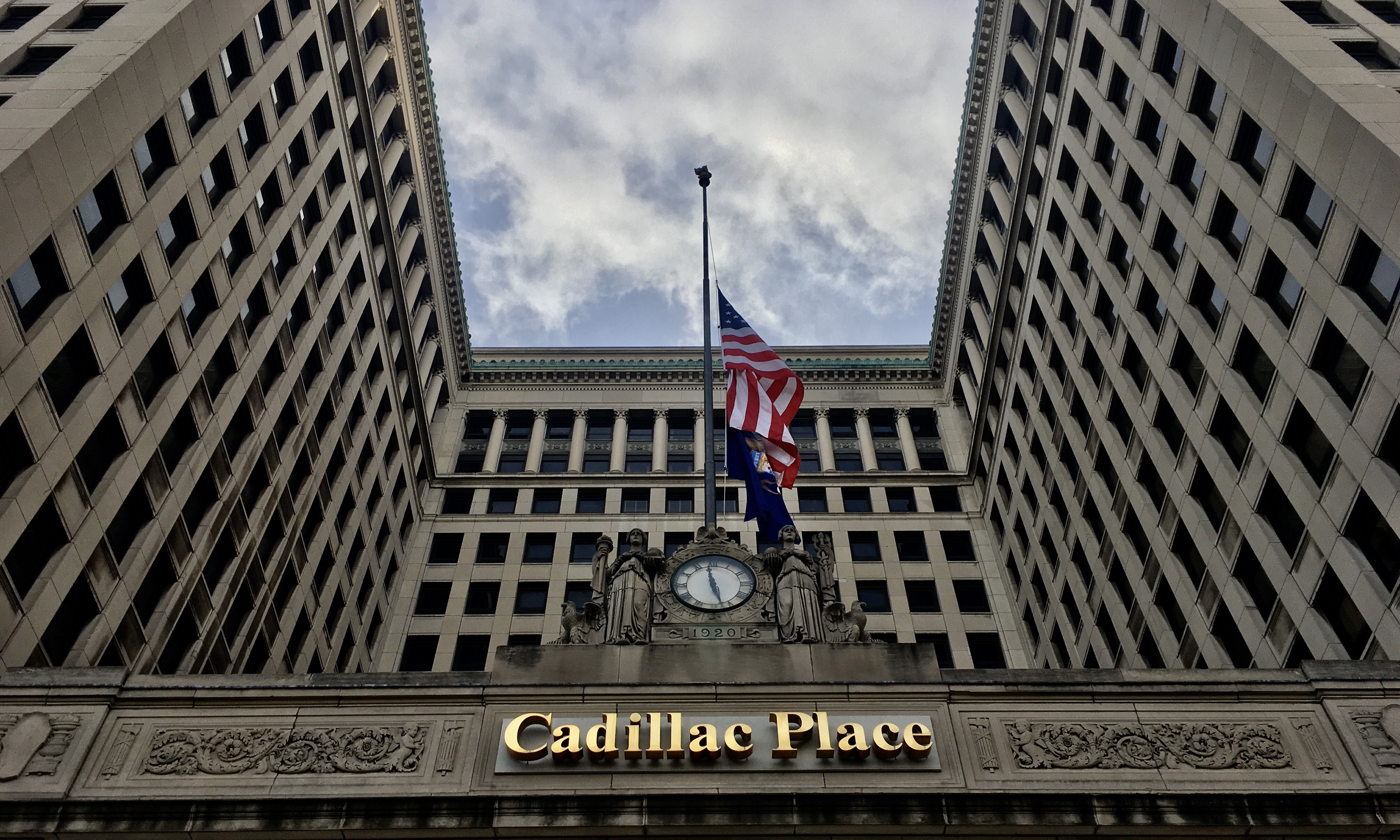
Grand Boulevard entrance looking upward

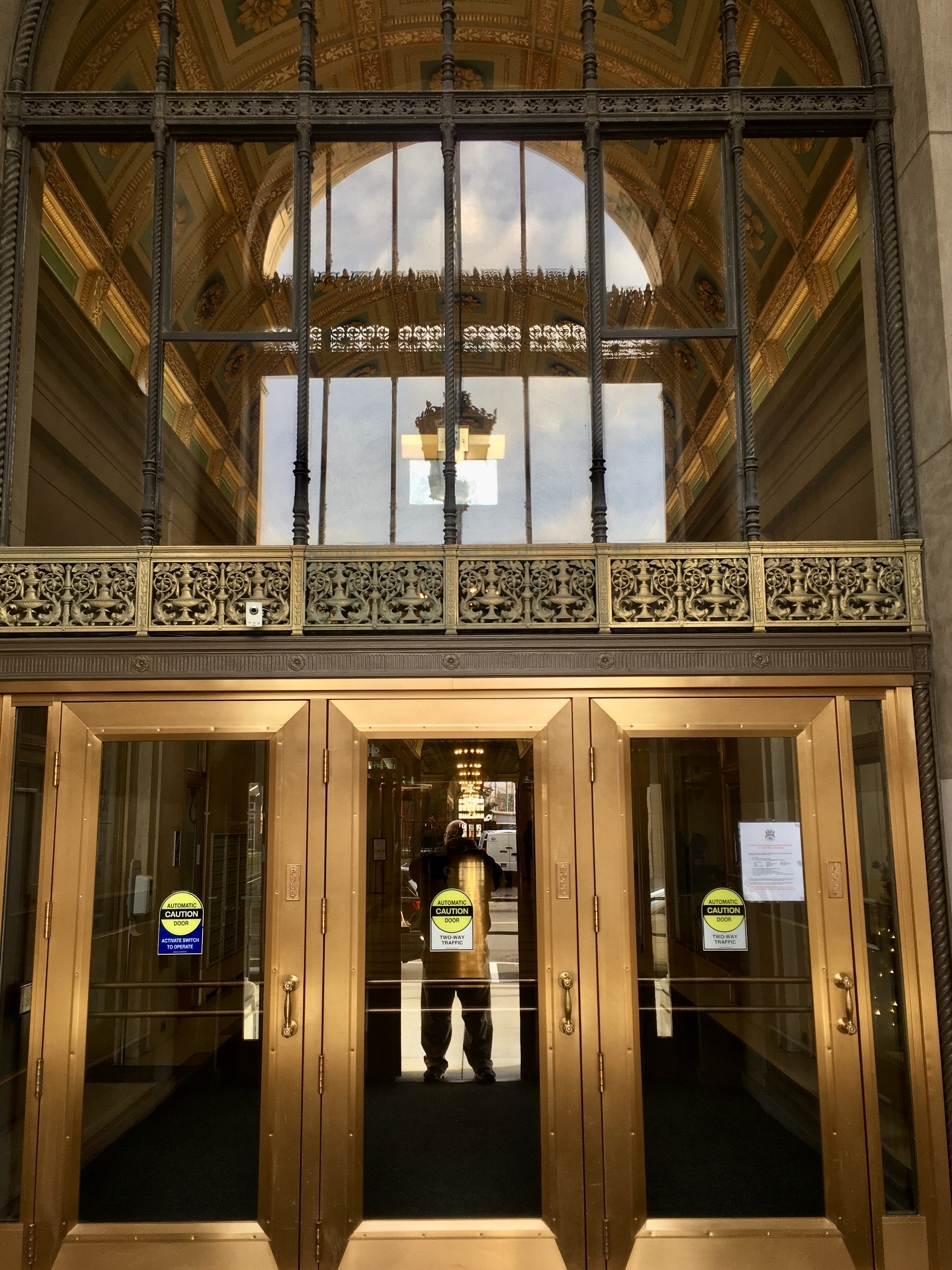
Second Avenue entrance

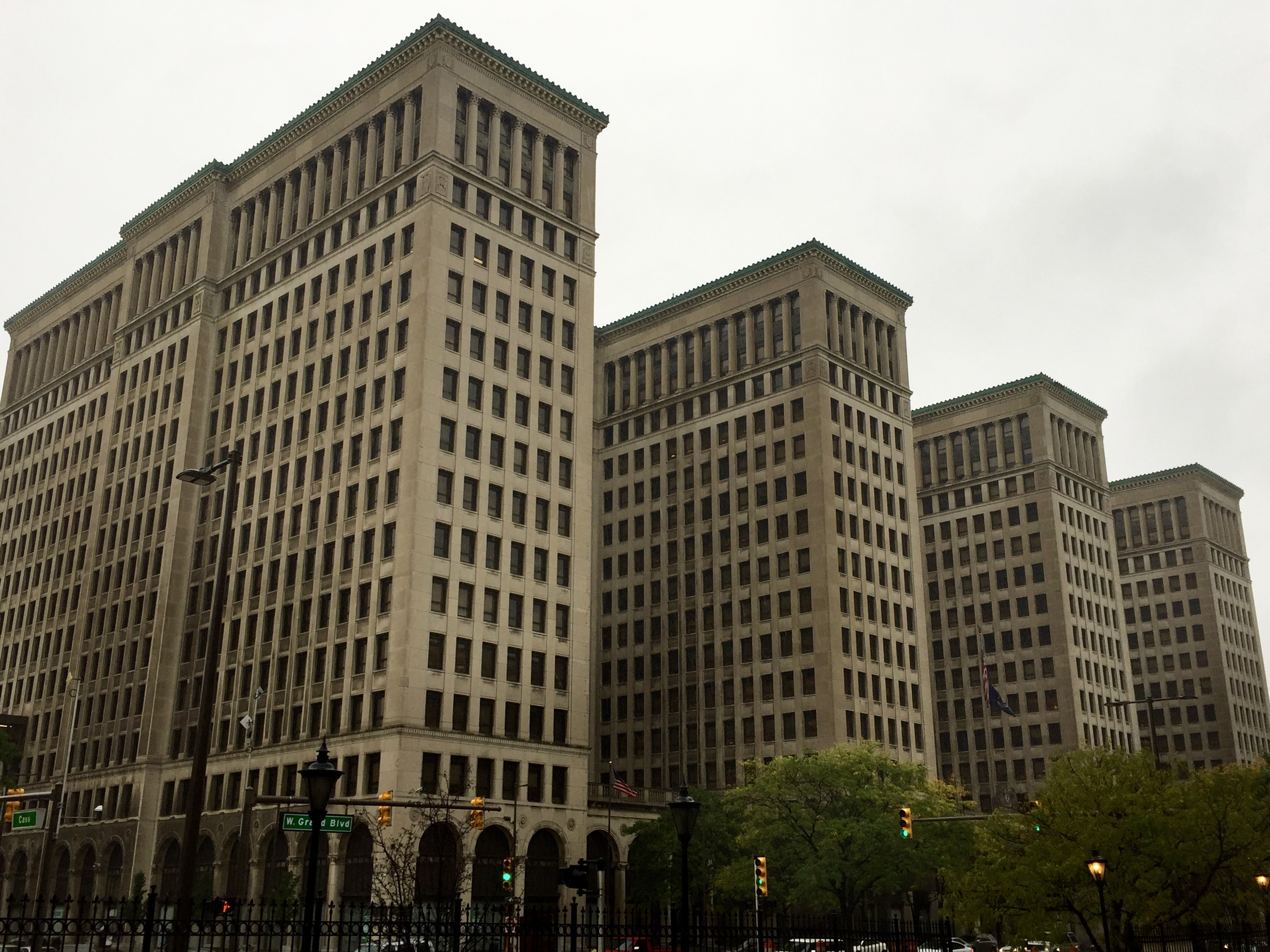
Exterior looking southwest

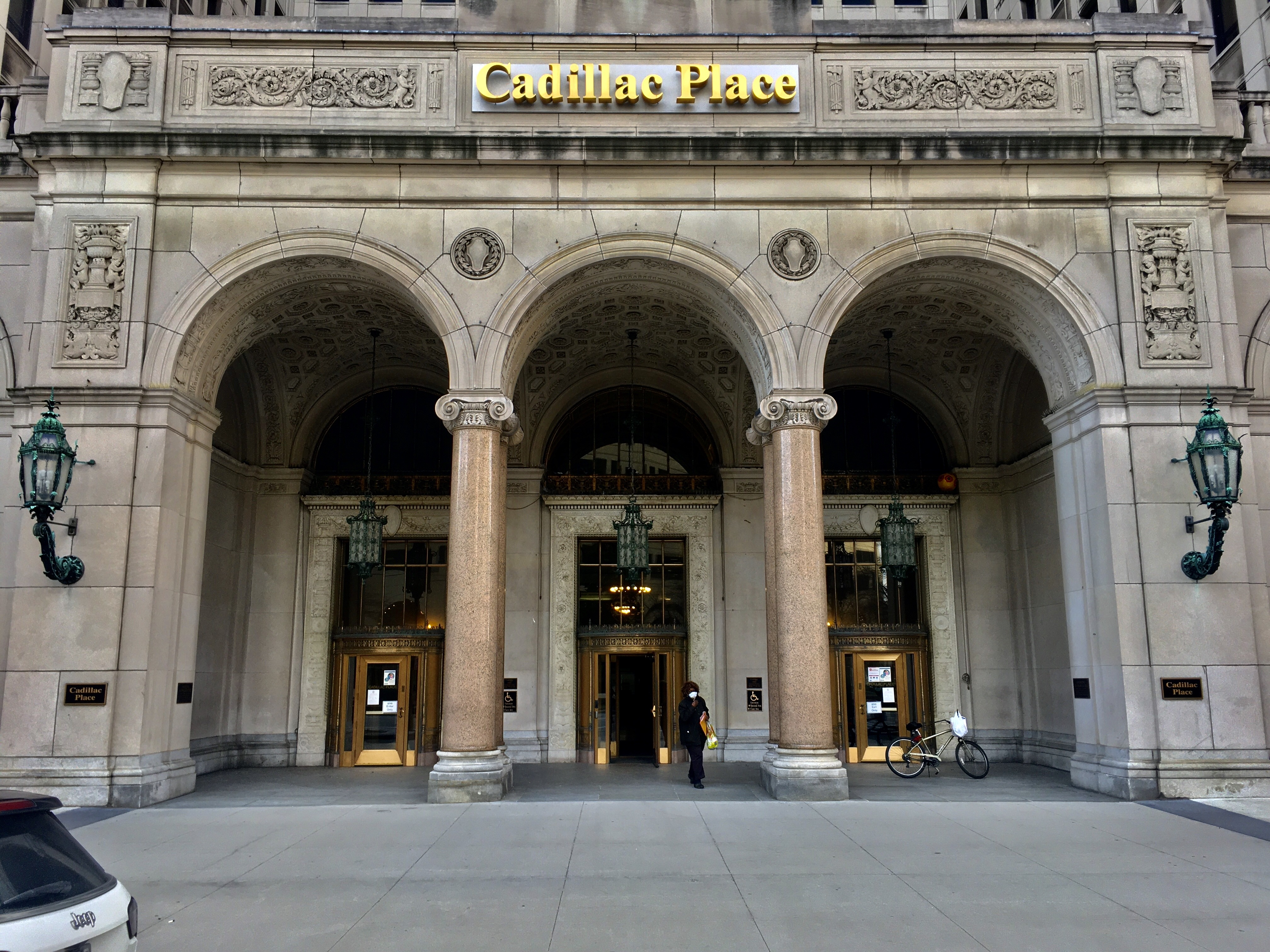
Grand Boulevard entrance

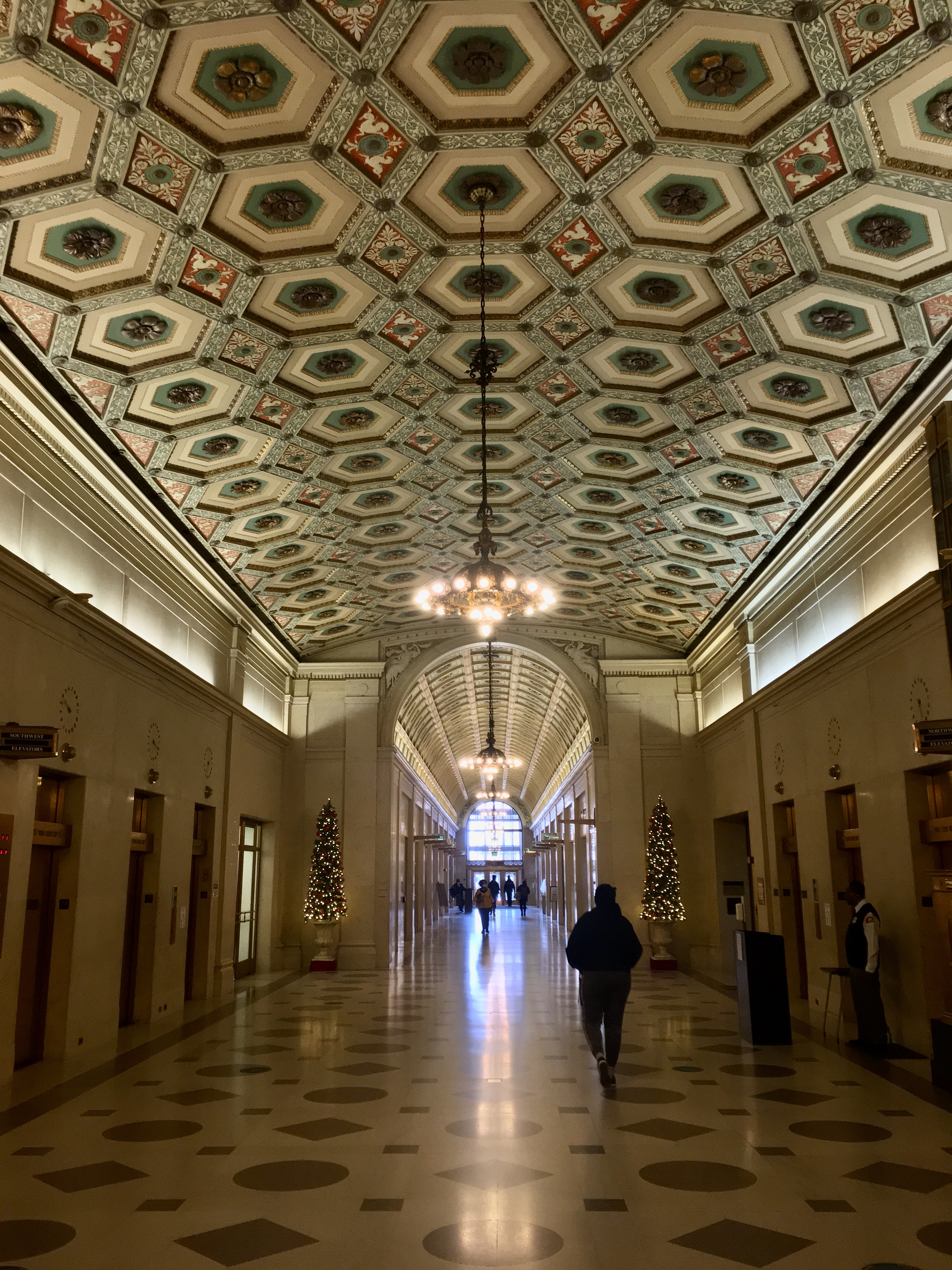
Elevator lobby looking toward Cass Avenue entrance

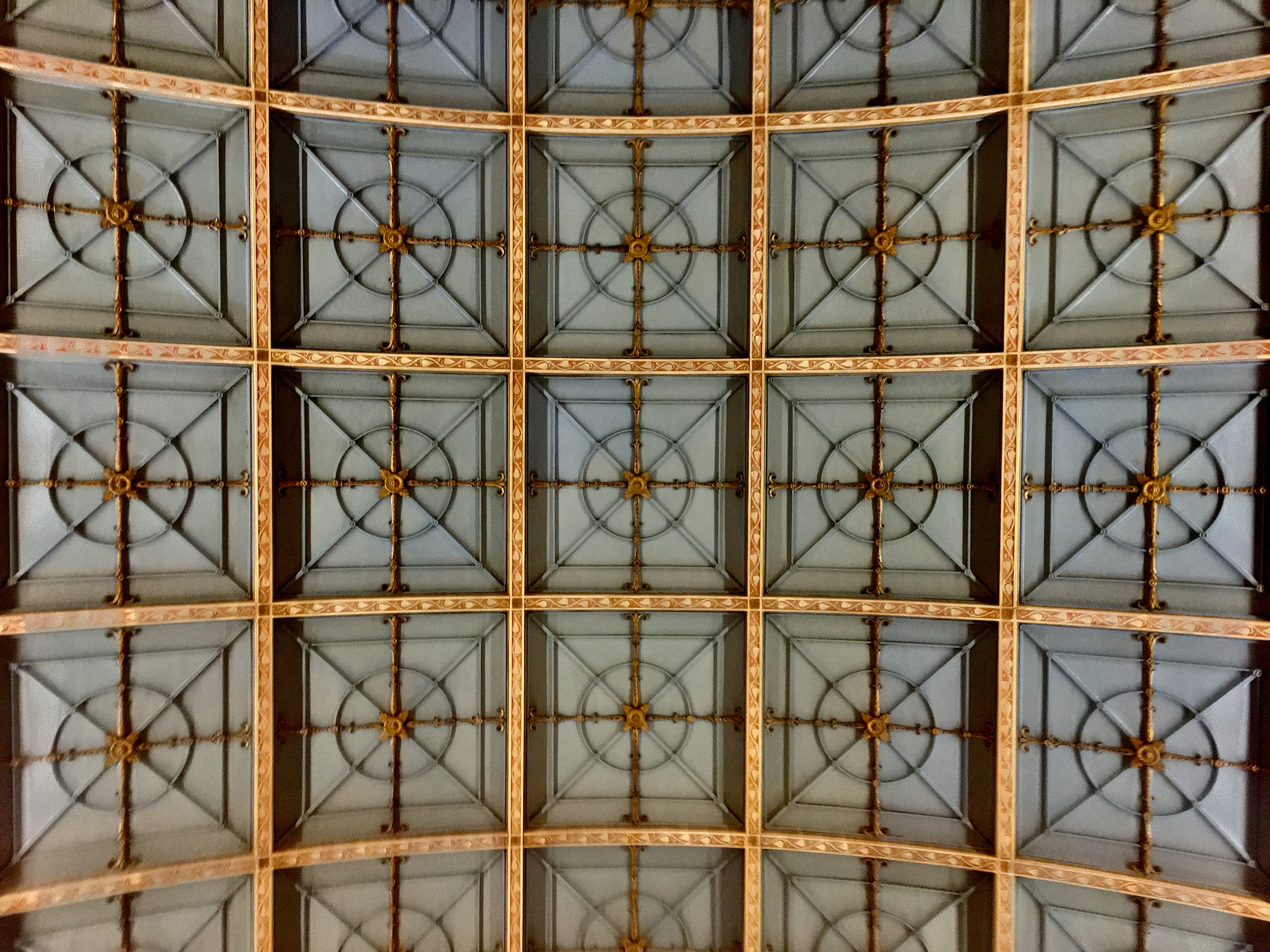
Grand Boulevard Entrance ceiling

== See also ==
- Fisher Building
- Henry Ford Hospital
- New Center, Detroit
- Penobscot Building
- Wayne State University
- List of National Historic Landmarks in Michigan
- National Register of Historic Places listings in Detroit
