= Shinola =

American shoe polish company

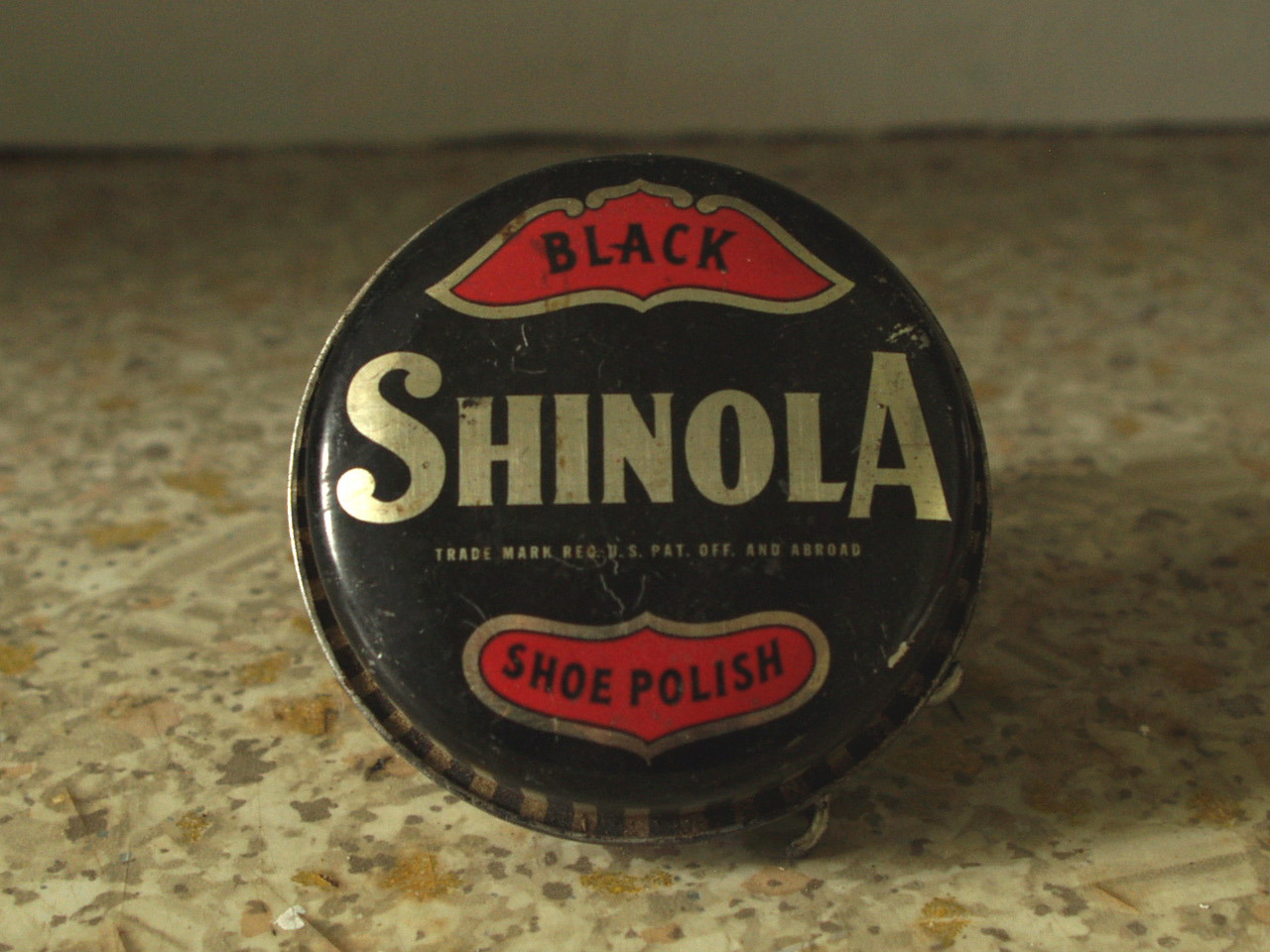
- A tin of Shinola shoe polish
- Founded: 1903
- Products: shoe polish

Shinola is a defunct American brand of shoe polish. The Shinola Company, founded in Rochester, New York in 1877, as the American Chemical Manufacturing and Mining Company, produced the polish under a sequence of different owners until 1960. "Shinola" was a trade name and trademark for boot polish. (Note: The original trademark was filed by the “2-in-1 Shinola-Bixby Corporation” in 1929.) The suffix -ola is a popular component of trade names in the United States. (Note: "The 'ola' suffix is popular in the USA as part of trade names, e.g. Crayola, Granola etc. This leads to the pronunciation of Shinola as shine + ola. That spoils the alliteration a little as it would work better as shin + ola.") It was popular during the first half of the 20th century and entered the American lexicon in the phrase, "You don't know shit from Shinola," meaning to be ignorant. The brand name was acquired by the retail company Shinola in 2011.

== History ==
Shinola home set, shoe polisher - Hallwyl Museum

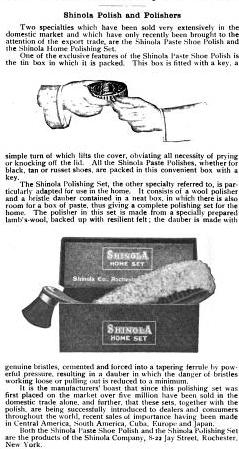
A July 1912 review of Shinola shoe polish from Commercial America, a trade magazine of the time.

George Melancthon Wetmore (August 31, 1858 – June 10, 1923) was born in Gates, New York and, after attending military school, got a degree at the Rochester Business Institute. At age 18, he went to work for the American Chemical Manufacturing and Mining Company, which was founded in Rochester, New York (near Brown's Race) in 1877. The company was primarily focused on carpet cleaning, but sold several specialty products, including boot and shoe polish. Wetmore found that the polish was cheaply made, did not hold or bond well, and 95% of it was dyed black using lamp black. Wetmore designed a replacement and initially called it SHINOL′A. In 1886, Wetmore was promoted to vice president, and a few years later, to president of the company. By 1909, the company had moved to a larger facility to handle increasing orders.

Shinola polish was noted for its distinct dark green tin with red and gold lettering. The tin came with a patented key "for the convenient lifting of the lid". Shinola was produced in several colors: black, white, oxblood, red, tan, and brown. Several Shinola-branded shoe shining accessories were sold as well, such as shoehorns and the Shinola Home Set which included a polisher, bristle dauber, and the polish itself.

Known by 1917 as simply The Shinola Company, the firm saw success expand globally, selling especially well in Europe, during the rise of World War I as many young men entered the military and were expected to be well-dressed during training. The company used a series of slogans to promote the product. For example, “Makes old shoes look like new. Keeps new shoes from looking old.” It became the largest manufacturer of the product in the world circa 1917, being carried into war by doughboys. After Wetmore's death in 1923, the company was sold and became part of the "2 in 1-Shinola-Bixby Corp.", beginning a series of acquisitions related to the brand. In the 1940s, the polish became a product of Best Foods and was renamed to Shinola (losing the apostrophe). Corn Products Company of Englewood Cliffs, New Jersey later merged with Best Foods, and sold tins of the product as "New Shinola Wax", featuring a revised formula, as well as selling in a liquid form. In a 1945 ad that ran in Popular Mechanics magazine, Shinola marketed itself as a wax that could also be used as a polish for scratches in furniture, a polish for linoleum, and a finish for toy models (e.g. airplanes). By the 1950s, it was sold as "Shinola Leather and Saddle Soap" by RIT Products, a division of Best Foods. In 1960, the company went out of business and the brand ceased to be produced.

In 2011, venture capitalist Tom Kartsotis bought the rights to the brand name, and created a new retail company. The company was founded in 2012, and produces watches and leather goods.

== Cultural impact ==
Shinola was immortalized in colloquial English by the phrase "You don't know shit from Shinola", which during World War II became widely popular and a barracks staple. Some have even theorized that the popular expression was a long-term detriment to the brand's identity. Nevertheless, the company did try to find other evocative promotional phrases, e.g., "Your shoes are showing", which they used in advertisements.

- In The Caine Mutiny (1951) Herman Wouk used "Shinola" as a euphemism in phrases such as "Shinola on that" and "that kind of Shinola". In one part he plays a riff on the trope: "Roland Keefer was the son of a West Virginian politician. He had had a job in the state personnel bureau, but, as he cheerfully phrased it, he didn’t know personnel from Shinola, and had simply been learning the ropes around the capitol when the war came."
- In the 1979 film comedy The Jerk, the character Navin R. Johnson (played by Steve Martin) is tested by "Daddy" (Richard Ward) on whether he knows the difference between shit and Shinola before leaving home.
- The phrase was used to a similar effect in Cleopatra Jones.
- The 1992 movie Basic Instinct features Gus telling Dr. Lamott, "Most times I can't tell shit from Shinola, Doc. What was all that you just said?"
- Dolly Parton wrote the song "Shinola" – which also uses a lyric that plays on the colloquial phrase – for her 2008 Backwoods Barbie album.
- Ween released a 2005 B-side and unreleased odds and ends compilation album – titled, Shinola, Vol. 1 on Chocodog Records – which plays on the colloquial phrase.
- The phrase has been grist for the mill for various musicians and artists. See Shinola (Energy Orchard album), an album by early 1990s Irish band Energy Orchard; Shinola (John Scofield album), a live album recorded in 1981 by jazz musician John Scofield; Shinola, an indie rock band from Chapel Hill, North Carolina that existed from 1994–1997; and Shynola, a group of visual artists from the UK that had exhibitions titled "Shinola".
- Comedian George Carlin used the phrase in his famous routine, the monologue "Seven Words You Can Never Say on Television", a different version of which became immortalized in FCC v. Pacifica Foundation, a First Amendment constitutional decision by the Supreme Court of the United States.
- Rapper MF Doom referenced the phrase in the lyrics written for "Figaro" on the 2004 collaborative album Madvillainy.
- Television show The Golden Girls Season 7 Episode 2: Rose: "You know, back in Minnesota, I was known as the Sherlock Holmes of St. Olaf." Dorothy: "Figured out which one was Shinola, did you, Rose?" Rose: "The hard way."
- In The Pope of Greenwich Village, "Paulie, the truth is this horse don’t know shit from Shinola. None of them do."
- In Raising Arizona (1987) it surfaced as "Aw, he don't know a cuss word from Shinola."
- In the fourth part of the Thomas Pynchon novel Gravity's Rainbow, the character "Pig" Bodine provides a lengthy explanation of the phrase "to know shit from Shinola" for a German character named Säure Bummer.
