= Tom Kartsotis =

American entrepreneur (born 1959)

Tom Kartsotis (born 1959) is an American entrepreneur, best known as the founder of the brand development firm Bedrock Manufacturing Co., which is named for The Flintstones hometown and was founded in 2003. Kartsotis was also known as the founder and the president of Fossil from 1984 until 2010.

== Career ==
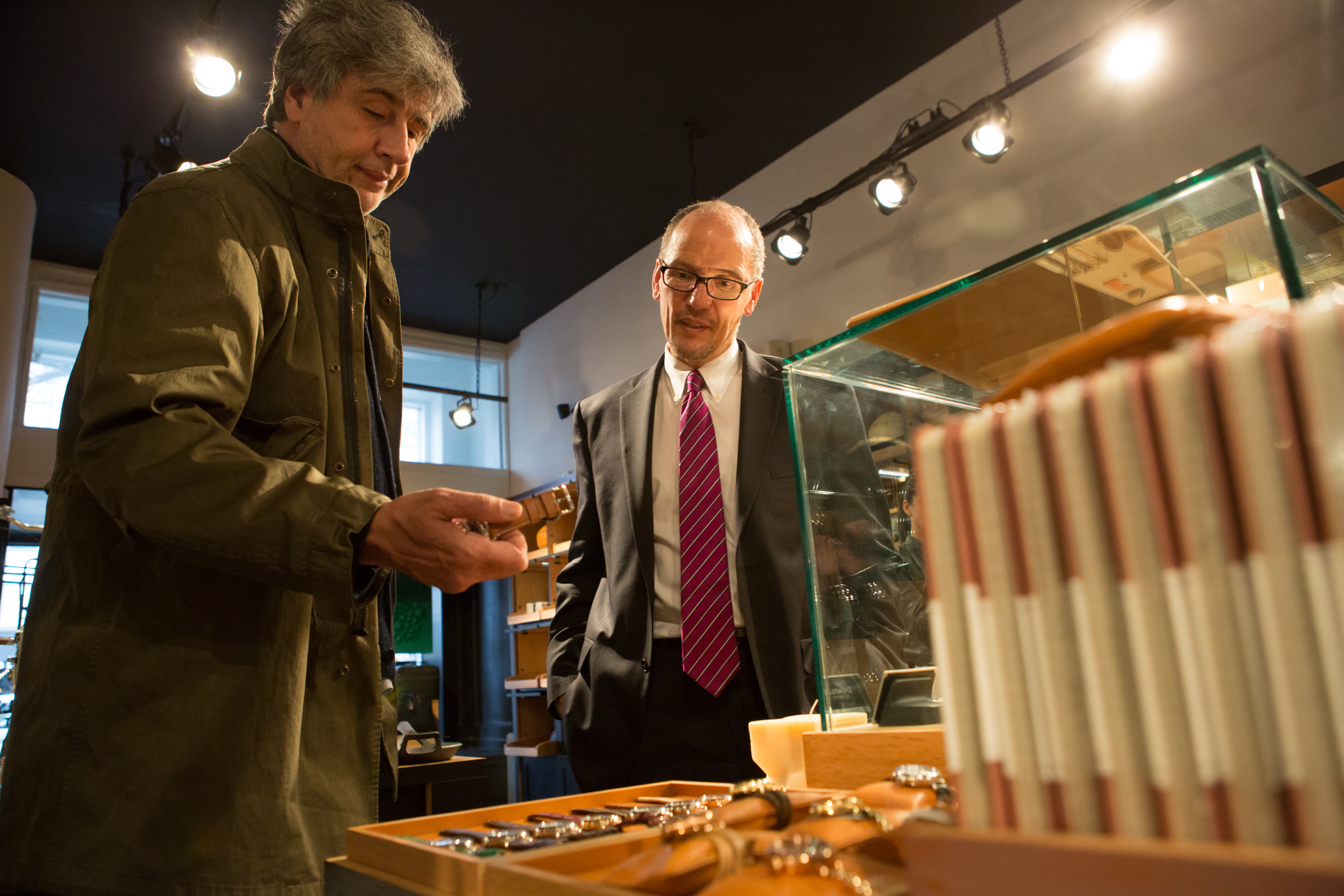
Tom Kartsotis (left) gives U.S. Secretary of Labor Thomas Perez a tour of a new Shinola location.

Kartsotis is the founder of Fossil Inc. in 1984 and served in roles including Director, President, Chief Executive Officer, Chairman from 1984 to January 2010. Kartsotis re-founded defunct shoe polish brand Shinola as Shinola Detroit and re-positioned it as a wristwatch brand.

Bedrock Manufacturing Co., established in 2005 by Tom Kartsotis—the founder of Fossil Inc.—is a privately held brand development firm based in Plano, Texas. The company functions as a platform enterprise, nurturing and scaling design-led consumer brands. Its notable portfolio includes Shinola, a Detroit-based lifestyle brand, and Filson, a Seattle-based outfitter specializing in outdoor apparel and accessories .

=== Controversy ===
In June 2016, the US Federal Trade Commission ordered Shinola to stop using 'Where American is made' as a slogan because "100% of the cost of materials used to make certain watches is attributable to imported materials." Kartsotis responded with an open letter which noted that the regulations defining "Made in America" for cars are not the same as for watches.

=== Other brands ===
Kartsotis has also invested in American designer Steven Alan and outdoor goods brand Filson. Kartsotis has served on the Board of Directors of Burton Snowboards since 2004.

== Personal life ==
Kartsotis is of Greek parentage. He shuns media attention and is rarely photographed. His brother, Kosta also served as CEO & chairman of Fossil, replaced Tom's position from 2010 through March 2024.
