= Glad Tidings Tabernacle =

Church in Manhattan, New York

Coordinates: 40.8124°N 73.9454°W

- Formation: 1907
- Type: church
- Headquarters: New York City

Glad Tidings Tabernacle is a church located at 2207 Adam Clayton Powell Jr. Boulevard between West 130th and 131st Street in the Harlem neighborhood of Manhattan, New York City. It has served New York City since 1907 with a focus on different cultures and diversity.

== History ==
On May 5, 1907, Sister Marie Burgess moved from Zion, Illinois to New York City and founded the church in a building on 41st Street. The mission was to help those who were homeless, hungry and outcast. Robert Brown, a young policeman and Methodist lay minister, began to collaborate with Burgess. Together, the two moved to a new location on 42nd Street a few months later, which they called "Glad Tidings Hall". Burgess and Brown married in 1909.

Both the local church and the worldwide mission work began to grow. In 1914, the congregation moved into an existing church building at 325 West 33rd Street, near Pennsylvania Station. The sanctuary was originally built in 1867-68 as Pilgrims' Baptist Church and was designed by George Chapman. It subsequently became the Thirty-third Street Baptist Church and the Collegiate Baptist Church of the Covenant, before being taken over by Glad Tidings

Also in 1914, the Browns helped to formulate the Assemblies of God, a voluntary cooperative fellowship of like-minded believers. For many decades, the Glad Tiding Tabernacle on 33rd Street was one of the largest Assemblies of God congregations in the United States.

Robert Brown died in 1948, and Maria Burgess Brown in 1971.
