= Shinola (retail company) =

Lifestyle brand based in Detroit, Michigan

- Shinola clock in Dumbo, Brooklyn
- Type: Private
- Industry: Luxury goods; Retail; Manufacturing
- Founded: 2011; 15 years ago
- Founder: Tom Kartsotis
- Headquarters: Argonaut Building, Detroit, Michigan, United States
- Area served: Worldwide
- Key people: Mark Light (president)
- Products: Watches; Leather goods; Jewelry; Clocks; Bags; Accessories; Home goods
- Brands: Shinola Hotel
- Number of employees: 400+
- Parent: Bedrock Manufacturing Company
- Website: shinola.com

Shinola is an American lifestyle brand based in Detroit, Michigan. It produces and sells watches, leather goods, clocks, home goods, and jewelry. Until 2025, the company also offered a line of bicycles. Founded in 2011, Shinola takes its name from a common saying that harkens back to the defunct Shinola shoe polish company. The company was founded by Tom Kartsotis and is owned and operated by Texas-based investment group Bedrock Group LP.

== History ==
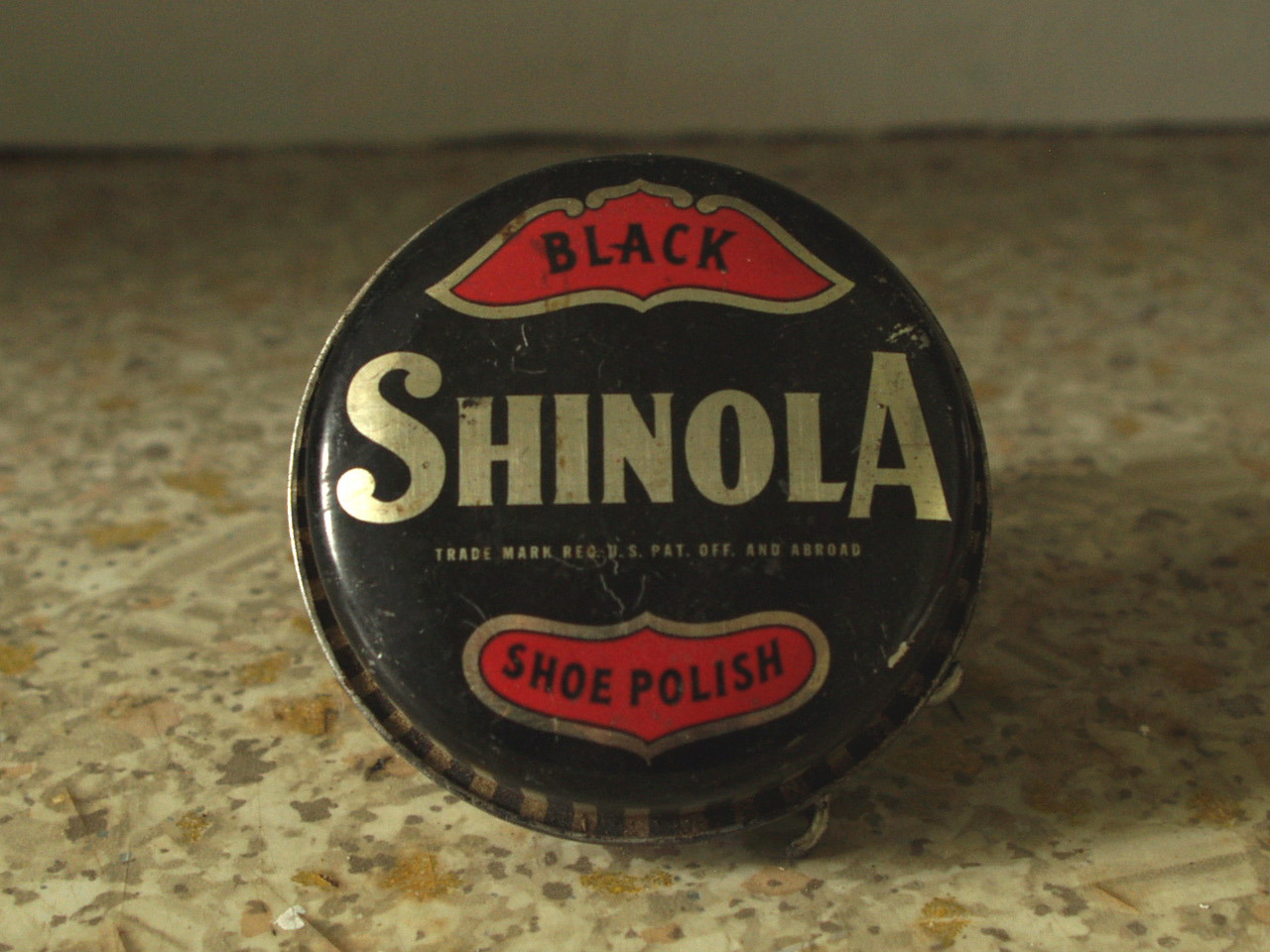
A tin of original Shinola shoe polish

The original Shinola shoe polish brand was founded in Rochester, New York in 1877, and went out of business in 1960. The Detroit-based retail company was founded in 2011 by Tom Kartsotis under his investment company, Bedrock. Kartsotis, previously a founder of Fossil Group, wanted to create a high end American watch manufacturing brand to rival Swiss watchmakers at a lower price point. Bedrock decided to acquire the Shinola brand after an associate used the World War I-era expression "You don't know shit from Shinola" as a rejoinder to Kartsotis's stated ambitions for the company. Unexpectedly, the joke generated a serious discussion about restoring the Shinola brand. Market surveys established that when faced with a choice of paying US$5 for a pen from China, US$10 for one made in the United States, and US$15 for a pen made in Detroit, consumers would be willing to pay a premium for the last one.

Every Shinola watch is technically assembled in the United States. However, many parts used in Shinola watches are manufactured in Europe, China, and Thailand. Certain components' factories are owned by companies based in Switzerland. At the time of the company's founding in 2011, no American watchmaker had produced watches at scale since the late 1960s, with U.S.-based watchmaking relegated to select specialty companies such as RGM in Lancaster, Pennsylvania. Shinola's tagline was "Where American is Made", (Note: Written by Griffin Creech of the Partners & Spade advertising agency.) but that was abandoned after the Federal Trade Commission requested changes in certain marketing and labeling practices. The company has actively utilized Detroit's reputation as a worldwide manufacturing hub in its marketing of the brand.

The company's headquarters and watch factory are housed within the College for Creative Studies (CCS) on the fourth and fifth floors of the Alfred A. Taubman Building in Detroit, a former automotive research lab. Shinola's occupation of the CCS space at first occurred by accident when Bedrock officials, seeking a manufacturing site after resolving to rebuild Shinola, visited the college and the elevator unexpectedly opened on the fifth floor, which was vacant at the time. They decided to transform the 30,000 square feet (2,800 m^{2}) of vacant space into their watch factory and company headquarters. To build out the watch factory, the company partnered with Ronda, which also brought in expert watchmaking veterans to train Shinola's watch assemblers, all of whom had no prior experience in watchmaking. Currently, the factory has the capacity to finish the assembly of 500,000 watches in a production year.

Most of the workers assembling watches are local to Detroit, and many of them come from automotive manufacturing. Since the company's founding in 2011, it has grown to over 400 employees as of 2021.

In 2021, Shinola partnered with Crate & Barrel to create a 115-piece furniture line and with the Ford Motor Company to create a concept for the Lincoln Aviator at the Pebble Beach Concours d'Elegance.

== Products ==
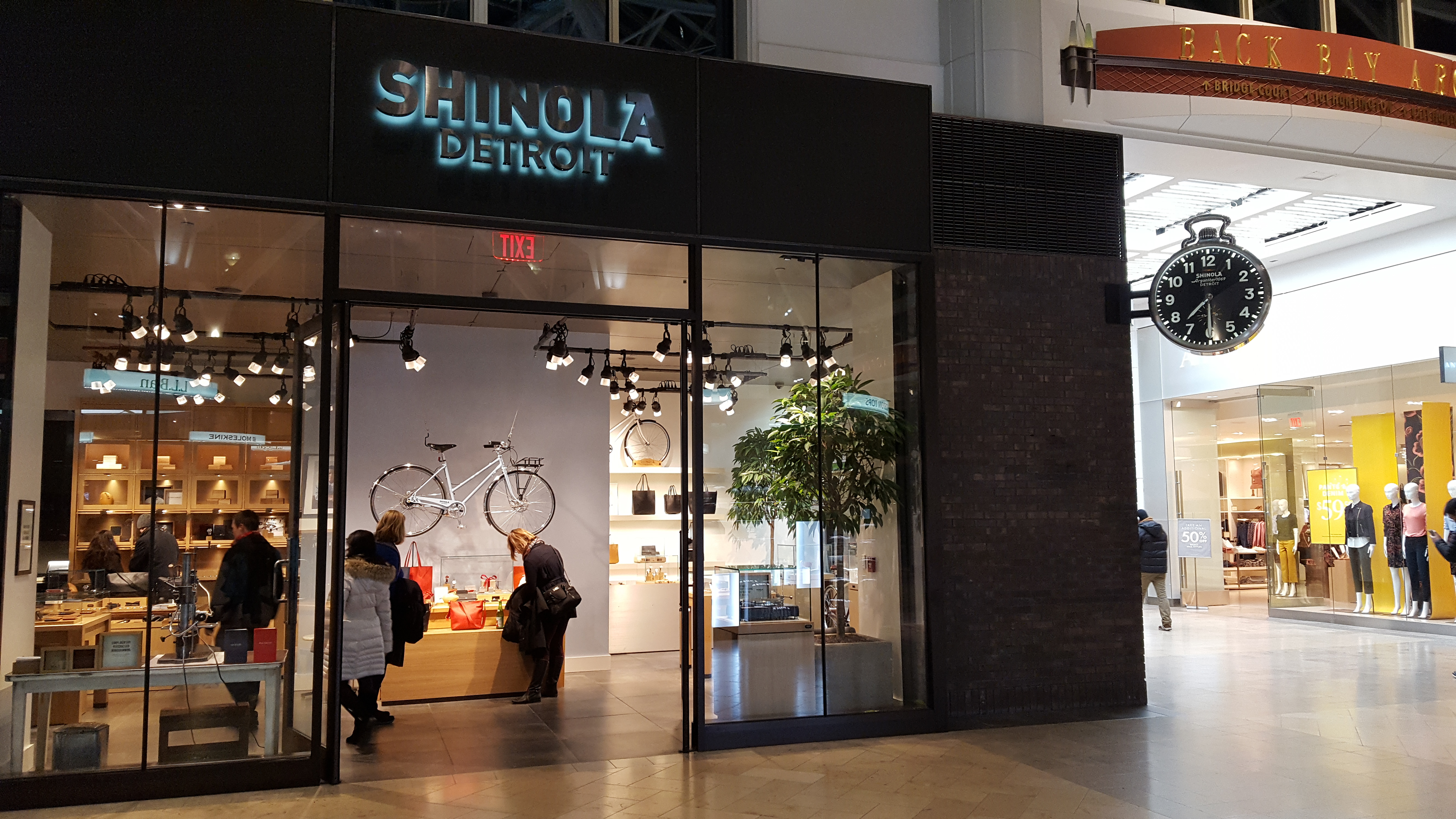
The Shinola retail location at The Shops at Prudential Center in Boston, Massachusetts.

=== Watches ===
Shinola began by producing watches with quartz analog movements. The company's first watch was released in March 2013. Produced in an edition of 2,500 and available in two sizes, the Runwell Limited Edition 47mm sold out in one week, with the last 40mm watch selling out in under two weeks. The watches were priced at $550, with approximately 35% of the sales coming from Michigan.

In December 2013, Shinola released its second limited edition watch, the Wright Brothers Limited Edition. It is the first watch in the Great Americans Series, which was released in conjunction with a limited edition bicycle. The series has released subsequent watches honoring other Great Americans, including Henry Ford (2014), Muhammad Ali (2015), Maya Angelou (2016), Jackie Robinson (2017), the Statue of Liberty (2018), Minoru Yamasaki (2019) and Motown legend Smokey Robinson (2020). The 2021 collection honors Jake Burton Carpenter, founder of Burton Snowboards.

In September 2014, Shinola released the Lattice, a limited edition wristwatch created in partnership with Oscar de La Renta. The 36mm women's watch was manufactured in Detroit in a limited edition of 250. Each purchase included a hardcover book created exclusively for the project, offering an in-depth look at Oscar de la Renta and his work.

In 2014, Shinola released the Black Blizzard titanium wristwatch in 48mm and 42mm sizes, as well as the next Signature Series limited edition, the Henry Ford Pocket Watch. The company also produces a variety of non-limited edition watch styles, including the Runwell, Birdy, and Detrola collections.

In response to public demand, the company unveiled its first mechanical watch, the Lake Erie Monster, in November 2017. Shinola attributed the delay to the time required for its Swiss suppliers to complete the mechanical movement.

In May 2021, Shinola released its first automatic chronograph, the Canfield Speedway.

=== Bicycles ===
Shinola, which discontinued bicycle production in early 2025, previously offered three models: the single-speed Detroit Arrow, the three-speed Bixby, and the 11-speed Runwell, which had an internally geared hub. (Note: The Bixby bears the name of a shoe polish produced by the original Shinola.) All three bikes were designed by Sky Yaeger, formerly of Swobo, Spot, and Bianchi. The chromoly steel frames and forks are made by Richard Schwinn's Waterford Precision Cycles in Waterford, Wisconsin.

In addition to the Bixby and the Runwell, Shinola produced two limited edition bicycles, including the Wright Brothers Limited Edition Bicycle and the Shinola Runwell Di2 Limited Edition, as well as a one-off Twinn Tandem bicycle and brass-plated Runwell bicycle. (Note: Built at Waterford Precision Cycles in Wisconsin and brass-plated in Detroit.)

=== Journals ===
Shinola sold journals with soft linen and hard linen in partnership with Ann Arbor, Michigan-based Edwards Brothers Malloy, prior to the printer's closure in 2018.

=== Leather ===
Shinola's leather goods and leather watch straps are made using leather predominantly supplied by the Chicago-based tannery, Horween Leather, which has been in operation since 1905. The tanning of the leather takes months, using a process that showcases the natural characteristics of the leather. Shinola leather watch straps were once made by Hadley-Roma in Largo, Florida, but are now produced at their factory in Detroit. A partial list of Shinola leather goods includes iPad and iPhone cases, wallets, portfolios, backpacks, and more.

In 2014, Shinola opened its own leather factory in Detroit, and has begun manufacturing leather watch straps under the leadership of Braloba, a Swiss-based, family-owned company run by Thomas Schori. The leather factory is equipped with custom-designed machines produced by Galli S.P.A.

Shinola also sells watch straps individually; leather straps have been sourced from Hadley-Roma in Largo, Florida and Horween Leather in Chicago, and rubber watch straps are made in partnership with Stern Manufacturing of Staples, Minnesota. The company also revived production of shoe polish in 2013, albeit in a different formulation and tin can packaging.

=== Jewelry and eyewear ===
Shinola launched a jewelry line in 2016, with initial pieces designed by New York City designer Pamela Love. In 2021, eyewear was added to the product line with the launch of three styles: the Rambler, the Bixly, and the Mackinac.

=== Shinola Hotel ===
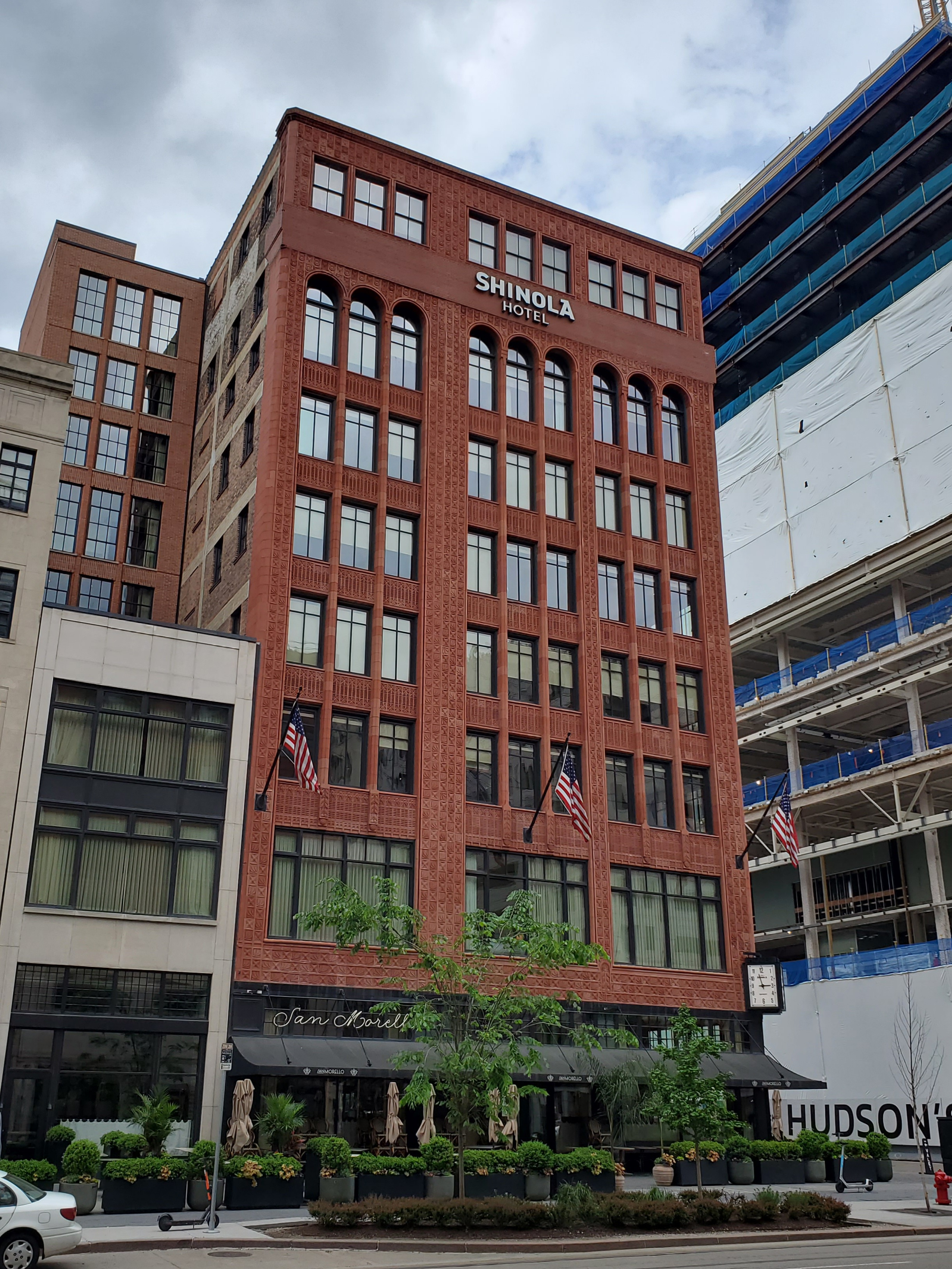
The Shinola Hotel in 2022

Shinola, in partnership with a Detroit real estate company, opened a 129-room, eight-story boutique hotel as part of a multimillion-dollar development project in January 2019. Located on Detroit's Woodward Avenue, the hotel occupies five buildings including historic structures such as the Singer Building and former T.B. Rayl & Co. shop. It also contains restaurant San Morello and a retail store. In 2021, Shinola Hotel provided lodging for the launch of the "Decked out Detroit" initiative, an effort to highlight local activities and businesses.

=== Shinola Pet ===
Shinola Pet was a collection of American-made dog beds, toys, leashes and collars produced in collaboration with photographer Bruce Weber. Shinola Pet supported the Michigan Humane Society and the Best Friends Animal Society in Shinola's mission to raise awareness about rescue organizations and to save pets by finding homes for them. A portion of the pets' toys were produced in partnership with Empowerment Plan, a Detroit-based charity organization that employs local women who are living in shelters, training them to manufacture sleeping bag coats for the homeless.

== Retail locations ==
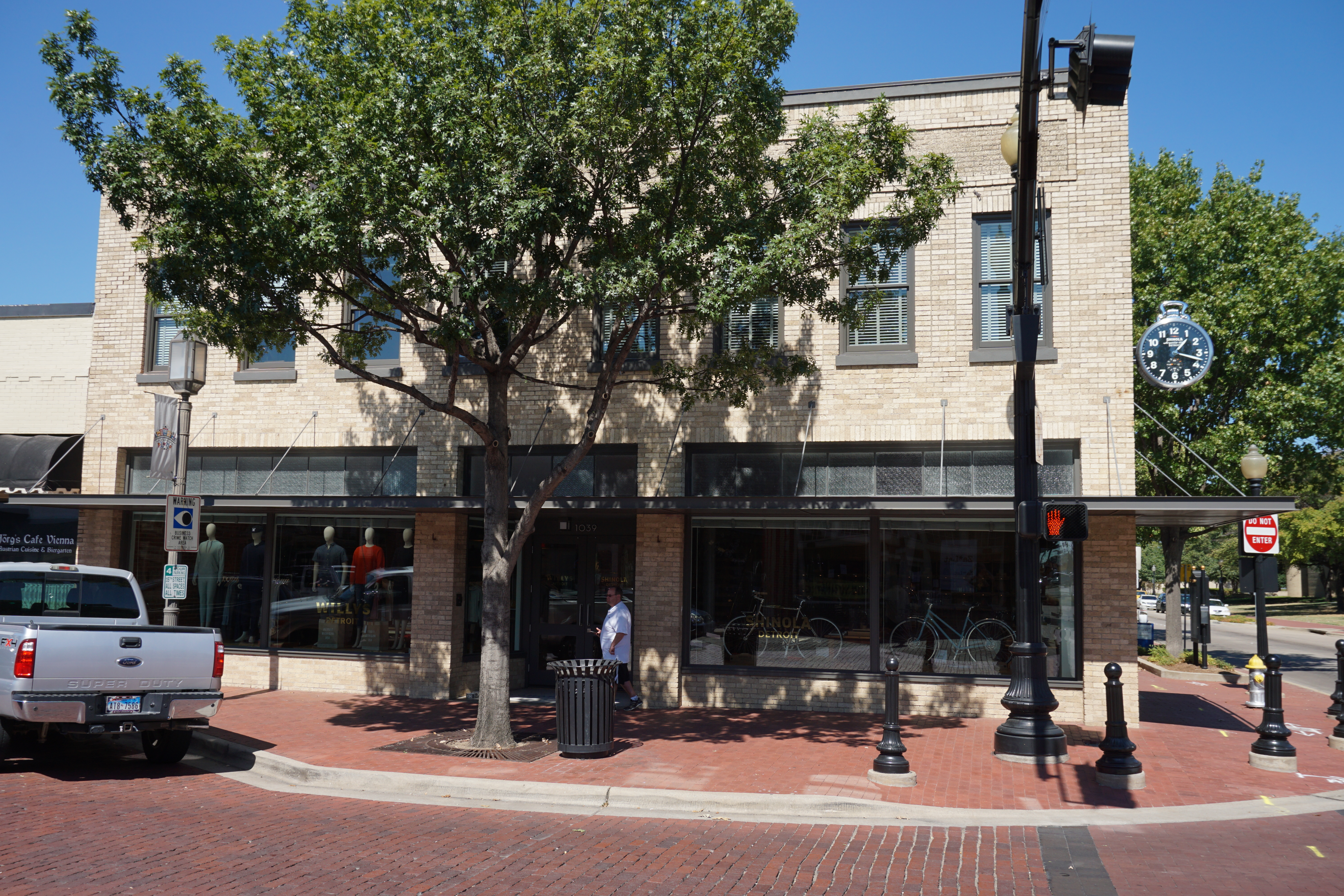
Shinola store in Plano, Texas

In addition to the Shinola website, Shinola products are available for sale at flagship stores in Detroit, New York (in the historic 177 Franklin Street), London, Toronto, Highland Park, Plano, Minneapolis, Chicago, Boston, Los Angeles, San Francisco, Washington, D.C., Cleveland, Columbus, Denver, Waikiki, Ann Arbor, and formerly at King of Prussia.

== Criticism ==
=== Made in America marketing ===
Detroit-based journalist Jon Moy has suggested that the choice of Detroit as the location of Shinola's factory was a calculated act of "opportunistic marketing" intended to yield feelings of nostalgia on a purchaser's part. He wrote about Shinola: "Shinola is using my city as its shill, pushing a manufactured, outdated and unrealistic ideal of America." That said, the company has invested intensely in its Detroit-based employees, flying in watchmakers from Switzerland to train them, paying significantly above minimum wage and retaining its workforce even as the broader manufacturing sector is criticized for outsourcing," per the Chicago Tribune. Michigan State University economist Lisa D. Cook said that operations like Shinola's factory in the city help fill the void as Detroit's car makers downsize. She said, "We can expect that many different types of novelty products might be produced, ones that require high skills like Shinola watches, and these goods, and goods like them, represent that kind of a comeback."

This marketing technique and Kartsotis's background have brought much attention to the company. In 2014, the men's style site Complex compared Shinola to a "trust fund kid that decided one day he wanted to start a company and had his dad buy him all the cool stuff." In 2013, in a review of its new store in Tribeca, the New York Times described Kartsotis as a "mid-price watch mogul looking to go luxury under the cover of charitable business practices".

In her article "Bougie Crap", for Infinite Mile, Professor Rebekah Modrak writes:

Texas-based Bedrock Manufacturing notoriously attached their Shinola venture to Detroit after test studies showed that consumers would pay three times as much for a product associated with the tenacity of a bankrupt city ...participants in the CCS/Shinola union enact the racial and class divide at play in the gentrification of a Detroit that's "rising from the ashes"...

In 2017, Modrak created the web-based artwork RETHINK SHINOLA that, in the words of critic Sarah Rose Sharpe,

"lays out the contradictions and racist underpinnings of Shinola’s branding, past and present, and the obliviousness with which the company parlays these damaging practices into present-day Detroit.... The evidence that Modrak has compiled is damning, presenting examples of overtly racist Shinola advertisements from the 1930s, all the way through a shockingly tone-deaf campaign shot by photographer Bruce Weber. Shinola commissioned Weber to photograph supermodel Carolyn Murphy (in her first visit to Detroit) hugging and bicycling with black Detroiters."

In June 2016, the Federal Trade Commission ordered the company to stop using "Where American is Made" as a slogan because "100% of the cost of materials used to make certain watches is attributable to imported materials."

=== Gentrification ===
A New York Times article about the brand begins with Kartsotis recalling the dire state of the Cass Corridor neighborhood, and his disbelief that a luxury store could succeed in the area. He even recalls himself asking, "You want to put a store here? You kidding me?"

Modrak asserted that Shinola “uses the design aesthetic of “calculated authenticity” and elements of hand-craft or personalization to suggest that the product is motivated by these values and not by crass economic gain.”

Moy accused Shinola of disguising their furthering of gentrification in the city with claims of city pride. He charges: “Shinola and other entrepreneurs market themselves as white knights, swooping in to save the noble savages.” Despite this, Kartsotis claims he is not in the business to make a profit, but rather to stimulate the local economy by paying workers, on average, $3 above minimum wage.

A Metro Times article commented that Shinola had “seized scrappy Detroit’s comeback story,” which some have called capitalizing on Detroit's poverty. Moy referenced alleged exploitation of black culture, and that using “photos of adorable black kids with a beautiful, benevolent white woman seem to be the centerpiece of Weber's campaign for the company,” arguing that their marketing enforces their “white savior” image.

== Community involvement ==
In 2014, Shinola partnered with Midtown Detroit, Inc., to open an off-leash dog park in Detroit.

Following the legalization of recreational marijuana in Michigan, Shinola released the Twenty After Four watch line in partnership with rapper Common and actor Woody Harrelson in 2020. Proceeds from the sale, just over $176,000, were split between two criminal justice charities: the Anti-Recidivism Coalition and Cabrini Green Legal Aide.

In 2021, Shinola produced 1,969 Pride watches to commemorate the 1969 Stonewall riots. The company donated $120,000 of the proceeds to the LGBT+ nonprofits SAGE Metro Detroit and the Ruth Ellis Center. Also in 2021, the company launched the Most Likely to Succeed watch line, with $40,000 in proceeds going to Money Matters for Youth, a nonprofit that teaches children financial literacy.

== Notable customers ==
Former President Bill Clinton bought 14 Shinola watches, calling the company an 'American success story'. Other politicians have promoted the product, including former Michigan Governor Rick Snyder and former President Barack Obama. On April 22, 2016, President Obama presented United Kingdom Prime Minister David Cameron with a custom Shinola men's watch featuring the seal of the president of the United States engraved on the back, presented in a wooden box, adorned with the US presidential seal.

== See also ==
- History of watches
- Hamilton Watch Company
- Illinois Watch Company
- Elgin National Watch Company
