= Shecky's =

Shecky's Media, Inc. is an American event promoter and city guide publisher.

Manhattan entrepreneur Chris Hoffman grew Shecky's into a multi-million dollar women-centric media company featuring his Girls' Night Out events that were held in 12 cities across the U.S. Over the years, Hoffman continued to expand Shecky's Girls’ Night Out, and Beauty Week, attracting sponsors looking to advertise to the Shecky's audience. The New York event is held in Manhattan's landmark Puck Building.

In 2006, Shecky's opened a fashion boutique in Manhattan's Lower East Side named Shecky's Shop. Shecky's Shop closed in 2012.
