= Fossil Group =

American designer and manufacturer of accessories

Coordinates: 32.9798°N 96.7025°W

Fossil Group, Inc.
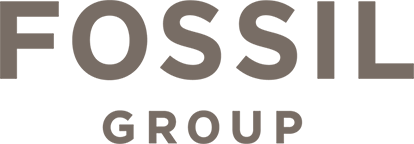
- Type: Public
- Traded as: Nasdaq: FOSL
- Industry: Fashion
- Founded: 1984; 42 years ago (as Overseas Products)
- Founder: Tom Kartsotis
- Headquarters: Richardson, Texas, U.S.
- Number of locations: 248 stores (2024)
- Key people: Franco Fogliato (CEO & Executive Board Member)
- Products: Watches, Jewelry, Leather
- Revenue: ▼US$1.14 billion (2024)
- Operating income: ▼US$−104.0 million (2024)
- Net income: ▼US$−102.7 million (2024)
- Total assets: ▼US$763.6 million (2024)
- Total equity: ▼US$136.7 million (2024)
- Number of employees: 5200 (2024)
- Website: fossilgroup.com

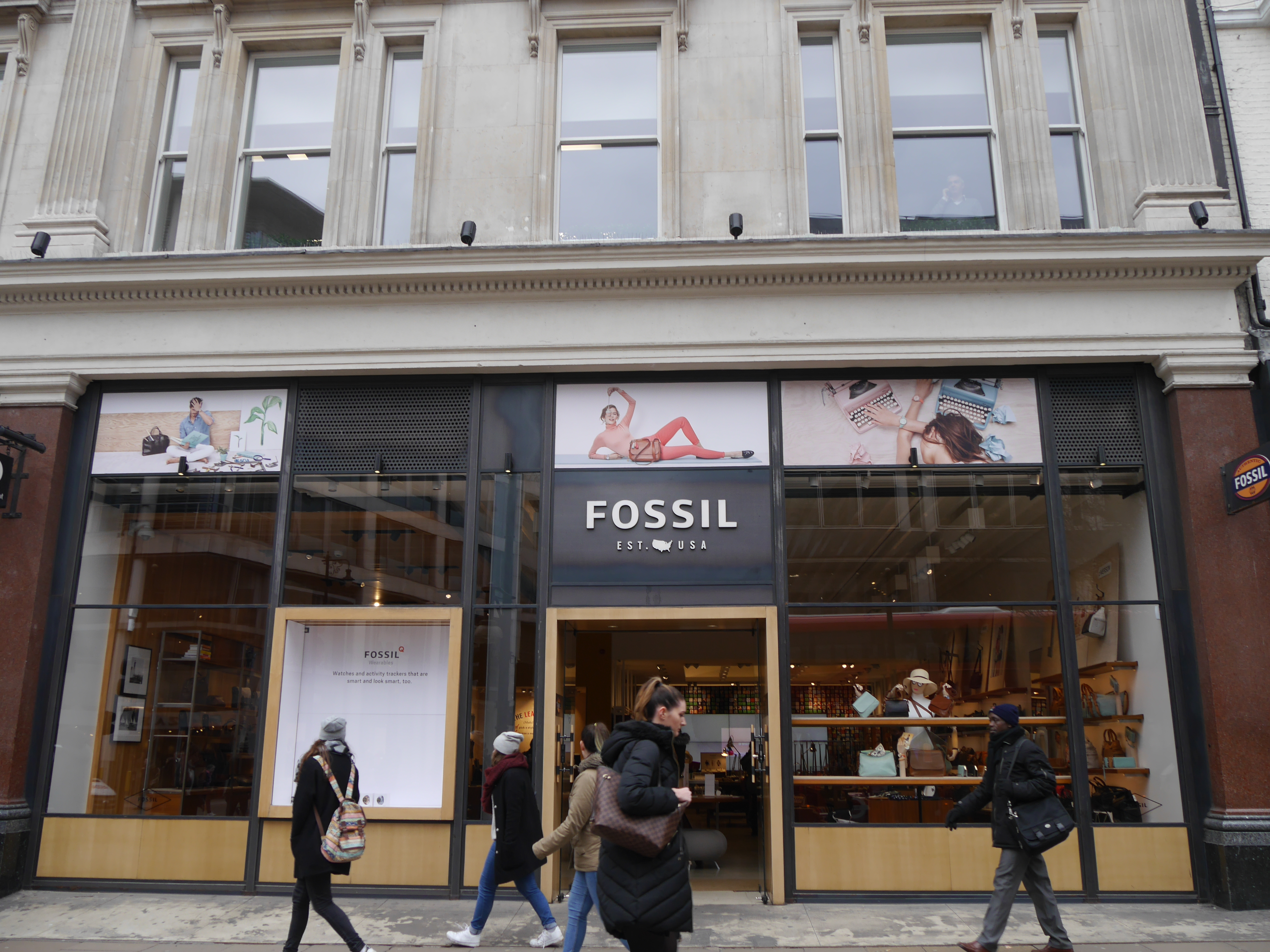
Fossil store, Oxford Street, London, 2016

Fossil Group, Inc., is an American fashion design and manufacturer founded in 1984 by Tom Kartsotis and based in Richardson, Texas. Their brands include Fossil, Relic, Michele Watch, Skagen Denmark, WSI, and Zodiac Watches. Fossil also makes licensed accessories for brands such as BMW, Puma, Emporio Armani, Michael Kors, DKNY, Diesel, Kate Spade New York, Tory Burch, Chaps, and Armani Exchange.

Franco Fogliato was appointed as CEO by the Board of directors on September 18, 2024. He replaced Kosta Kartsotis, founder and former CEO of Fossil Group, Inc. Fogliato most recently served as president and chief executive officer of Salomon, a division of Amer Sports, Inc. (NYSE: AS), from November 2021 until April 2024.

== Company history ==
Fossil was founded in 1984 as Overseas Products International by Tom Kartsotis, a former Texas A&M University student living in Dallas from a suggestion by his older brother, Kosta Kartsotis, a merchandising executive at Sanger-Harris. Kosta told his younger brother about the potential large profits that could be made in importing retail goods made in the Far East, specifically in importing moderately-priced fashion watches. Their main product was fashion watches with a retro look. In 1990, they introduced leather goods under the Fossil brand, and the Relic line of watches.

Fossil had its initial public offering in 1993.

Zodiac Watches was a Swiss brand that had been operating since 1882 when Fossil acquired it from Genender International in 2001 for $4.7 million. Fossil's desire to establish a Swiss presence led to the purchase of the Zodiac Watch brand and a complete retooling of that line to reflect a retro modern 1970s style in a higher end watch. The 2004 purchase of Michele Watch completed the cycle by offering a high-end Swiss watch with a designer flair.

In September 2007, Fossil was accused of infringing a patent owned by Financial Innovations Systems, LLC, in a lawsuit filed in the Northern District of Texas. The case was settled for an undisclosed amount and dismissed shortly thereafter.

The Watch Station International chain was purchased from Luxottica/Sunglass Hut in December 2007.

Fossil has design studios in Biel, Switzerland, close to Rolex as well as manufacturing facilities in China and distribution centers in Dallas, Germany, and Asia.

In 2012, Fossil, Inc. agreed to purchase Skagen Designs and some of its partners for approximately $225 million in cash and 150,000 Fossil shares. The total value paid by Fossil would be approximately $236.8 million.

In early 2013, Fossil introduced their upscale and more expensive "Fossil Swiss" line of watches which are made in Switzerland.

In November 2015, Fossil acquired Misfit for $260 million, with plans to incorporate Misfit's technology into traditional-looking watches.

In 2021, the company cut their number of employees from 10,200 to 7,500.

In 2022, Fossil Group appointed Lisa Marie Pillette as Senior Vice President and Chief Marketing Officer.

In January 2024, the company announced that it would leave the smartwatch business.

In October 2025, as part of a restructuring plan in the UK, the company sought US recognition and placed its US business in Chapter 15 bankruptcy.

== Licensed business ==
Original Fossil logo from 1985, still in use today

Second Fossil logo (2015–2023)

Fossil has had financial success with its own brands and this success has led a number of deals for licensed watch lines. In 2001, Fossil collaborated with designer Philippe Starck to create the Starck with Fossil watch collection. The collection features ultra-modern designs and unique movements. Other licensed watch lines that Fossil designs, manufactures, and distributes include Burberry, DKNY, Emporio Armani, Armani Exchange, Columbia Sportswear, Diesel, Frank Gehry, Karl Lagerfeld, Tory Burch, Kate Spade, Michael Kors, Callaway Golf, Davis Cup, Marc by Marc Jacobs, Skagen Designs, Michele, and Adidas. When referencing Fossil's watch lines, they are generally regarded as a "manufacturer"; Fossil also designs and manufactures their own movements under the Fossil Twist Line.

== Special products ==
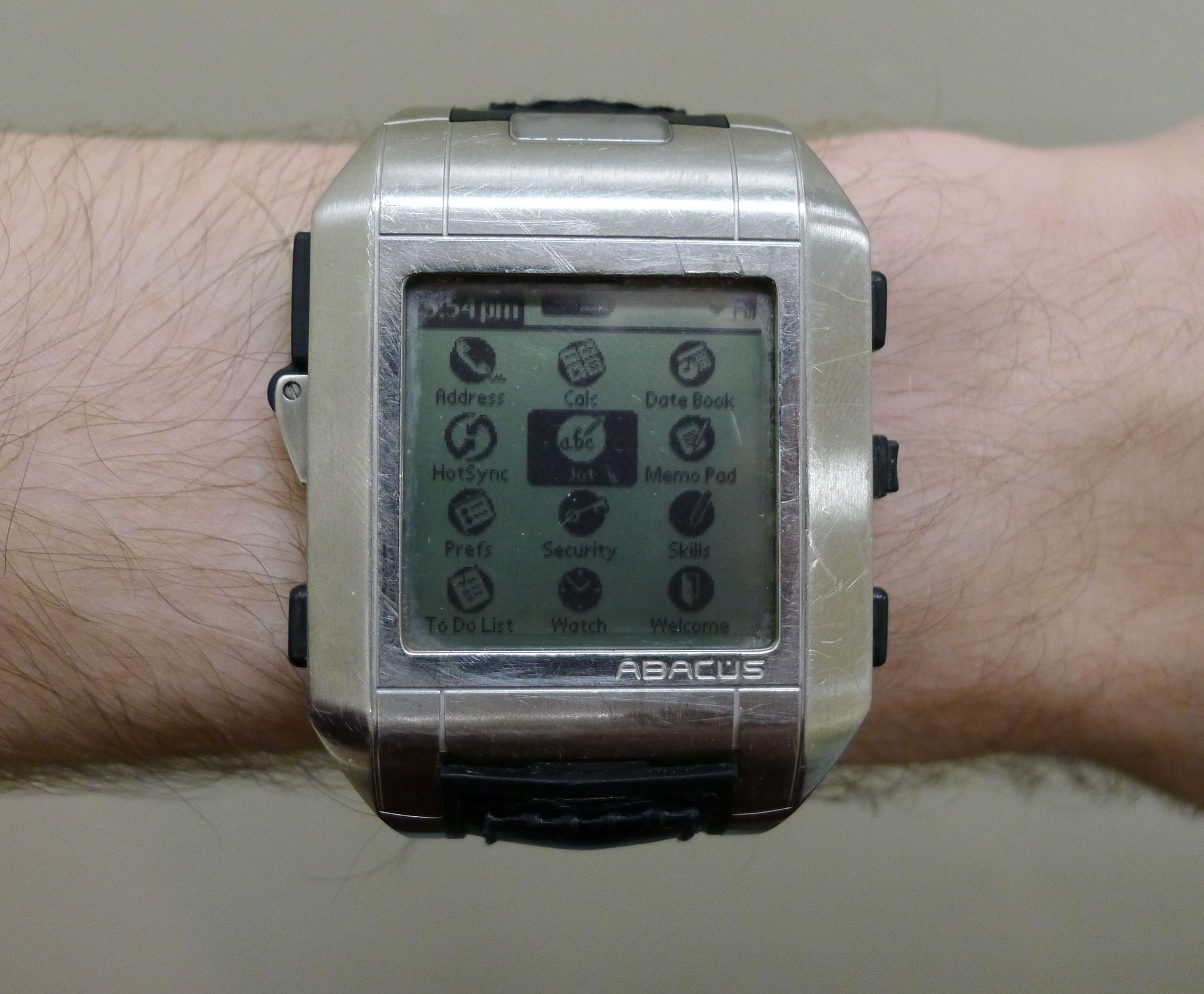
The Fossil Wrist PDA released in 2003, which runs Palm OS

In addition, the company produces collectibles, some of which are based on popular films or pop culture characters. Previous designs include: Superman; Batman; Wonder Woman; Elvis Presley; Pirates of the Caribbean; Flash; Green Lantern; Snoopy, Pokémon; Star Wars; Chronicles of Narnia; Cars; The Matrix; Harry Potter and Minecraft.

In 2003, the company released the "Fossil Wrist PDA" wristwatch computer which is a tiny Palm OS-based PDA worn like a watch. In 2006, Fossil released a Caller ID watch.

In 2006, Fossil teamed up with the National Football League in the United States to make the official watch collection for each team. Fossil also caters to special markets that seek to customize products.

== Websites ==
Fossil Groups's e-commerce website, fossil.com, has a total of 248 stores as of the 2024 fiscal year review that cut across the world such as Fossil UK, Fossil USA, Fossil India, and even in Africa within nations like Fossil South Africa, and Fossil Nigeria.

== Awards ==
Fossil won awards for "Most Effective Use of Online Creative" and "Best of Show" awards for the 6th Annual DFWIMA Excellence in Interactive Marketing (in 2006).

Fossil has also been voted one of the Top 100 Best Companies to work for in the U.K in 2013 and 2015.

In 2016, Fossil won Fashion Tech Collection of the Year for their connected designer smartwatches and jewellery. Their analog smartwatches and connected jewellery span across their licensed brands such as Diesel, Emporio Armani, Michael Kors, and Kate Spade.
