= Rosedale Park, Detroit =

- Rosedale Park Historic District
- U.S. National Register of Historic Places
- U.S. Historic district
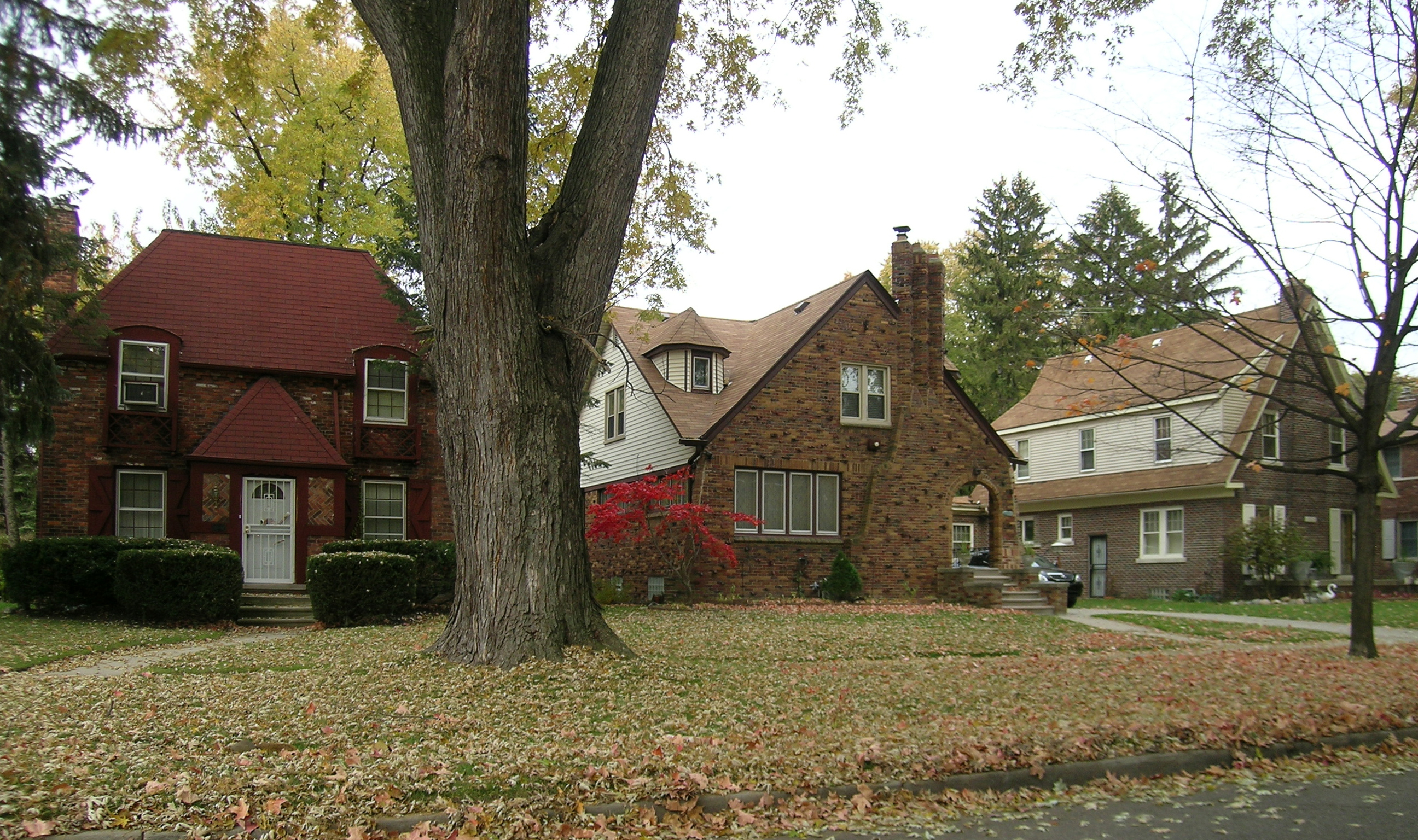
- Streetscape on Artesian St.
- Interactive map
- Location: Roughly bounded by Fenkell, Outer Dr. W, Grand River Ave., Southfield Fwy, Glastonbury, Lyndon, Westwood Dr. Detroit, Michigan, U.S.
- Coordinates: 42°24′1″N 83°13′37″W
- Built: 1916
- Architect: Albert Kahn
- Architectural style: Colonial Revival, Tudor Revival
- NRHP reference No.: 06000587
- Added to NRHP: July 12, 2006

Rosedale Park is a historic district located in Detroit, Michigan. It is roughly bounded by Lyndon, Outer Drive, Grand River Avenue, Southfield Freeway, Glastonbury Avenue, Lyndon Street and Westwood Drive. It was listed on the National Register of Historic Places in 2006. The Rosedale Park district has the largest number of individual properties of any district nominated to the National Register of Historic Places in Michigan, with 1533.

The district contains primarily brick houses, and was largely developed from the late 1920s through the 1940s.

== History ==
The land on which Rosedale Park sits was originally deeded in 1835 to Otis C. Freeman and George Bellamy as two 80-acre (32 ha) parcels. Over time, these parcels were subdivided until in 1916, the Rosedale Park Land Development Company purchased and platted a large portion of what was to become the Rosedale Park Historic District. This development company platted other projects in addition to Rosedale Park, most notably the North Rosedale Park neighborhood directly across Grand River Avenue. The company considered the location amenable to development because of its proximity to Grand River Avenue, a direct link to downtown Detroit, and the contemporaneous construction of Outer Drive.

Interest in the new subdivision was immediate, and in 1917, the Rosedale Park Land Development Company platted an addition to the original area. However, the actual construction in the neighborhood was slow—from 1917 until the end of World War I, only 15 houses had been constructed. However, construction soon blossomed, and in 1921, a third addition was platted. The city of Detroit annexed the subdivision in 1926, bringing water and sewer to the neighborhood and making the area more attractive.

Compared with other contemporary neighborhoods, such as Palmer Woods and the Grosse Pointes, Rosedale Park has more modest house and lot sizes reflecting the solidly middle and upper-middle class status of the original homeowners. Many of these original homeowners were professionals, such as doctors, dentists, accountants, or had white-collar jobs in the booming automobile industry.

With the onset of the Great Depression in 1929, building in the area slowed, but in 1934, as the FHA made credit more available, construction again resumed, and another growth spurt in the neighborhood occurred in the late 1930s and early 1940s. By the 1950s, there was a house on nearly every lot in the neighborhood. In the later part of the century, as the population in Detroit declined, Rosedale Park has remained a desirable neighborhood due to its high grade housing stock, charming setting and active neighborhood association.

== Description ==
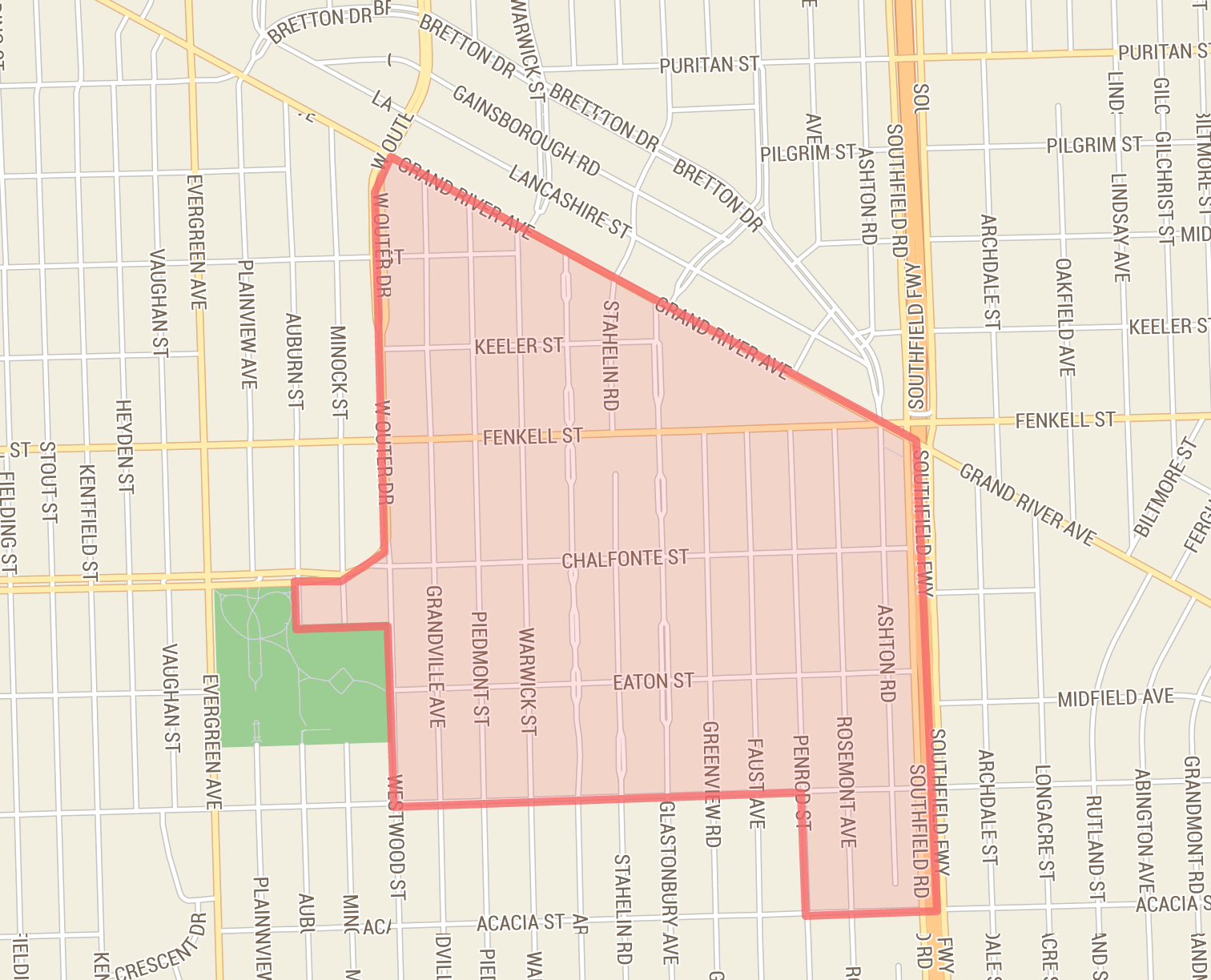
District location and boundary

The Rosedale Park Historic District is residential in character. Primary streets run north-south, and major stone piers mark the primary entrances into the neighborhood. Traffic islands are placed in the center of many of the streets. Oak and maple trees, some planted in the 1910s and 1920s, line the streets.

Private architects were only rarely engaged in Rosedale Park construction. Instead, buyers gained inspiration from mass-produced pattern books and house plans or worked with construction companies to choose plans from their standard offerings. Between 1917 and 1955, houses were built in a multitude of styles, including English Tudor Revival, Arts and Crafts, Bungalow, Colonial Revival, Dutch Colonial, American Foursquare, Prairie, French Renaissance, Ranch, Garrison Colonial, Cape Cod and International style. However, an English country esthetic seems to have been encouraged (although not mandated) by the developers, and this seems to have influenced the renaming of many of the subdivision's streets, such as Glastonbury and Warwick, to names reflective of Merry Old England. Later, in the less prosperous late 1930s and early 1940s, less elaborate Colonial and Ranch styles were built, but even these tended to have Tudor Revival elements.

== Education ==
Residents are zoned to Detroit Public Schools,

For elementary school, most areas are zoned to Gompers K-8 School in Brightmoor while some are zoned to Cooke Elementary School. All residents are zoned to Gompers K-8 for middle school and Frank Cody High School for high school.

The current Gompers Elementary-Middle School, serving Grades PreK-8, opened in 2011. The two-story, Leadership in Energy and Environmental Design (LEED)-certified facility replaced the Gompers, Harding, and Vetal schools and was built on the Harding site for $21.4 million. It has an elementary wing and a middle school wing. The central administration suite, gymnasium, and multi-purpose room are between the two wings.

Previously Vetal K-8 served portions of Rosedale Park for elementary school, and Vetal and Murphy served portions of Rosedale Park for middle school. At one time, residents of Rosedale Park were zoned to Redford High School.

== Gallery ==
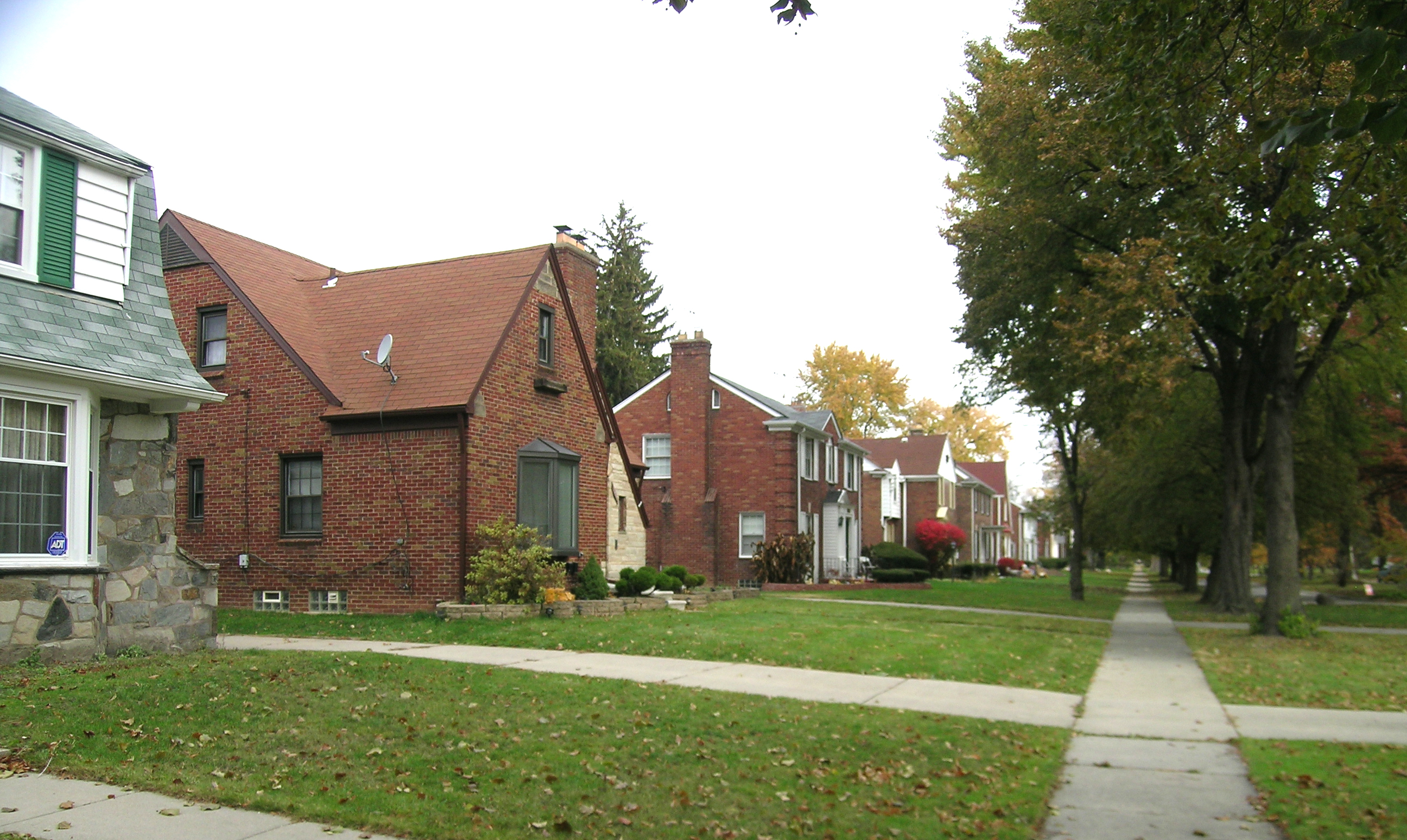
Streetscape on Glastonbury Ave.

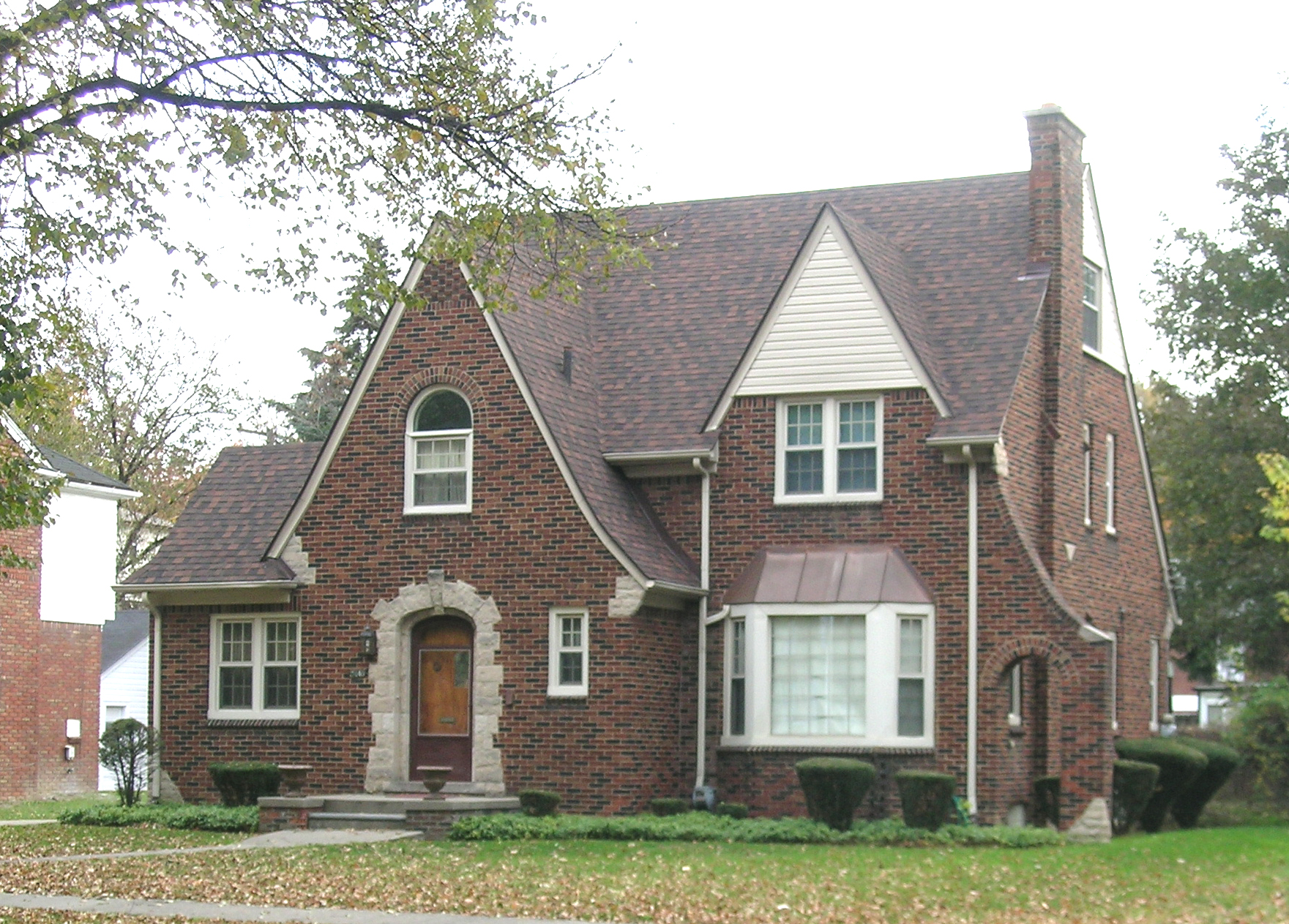
House on Glastonbury

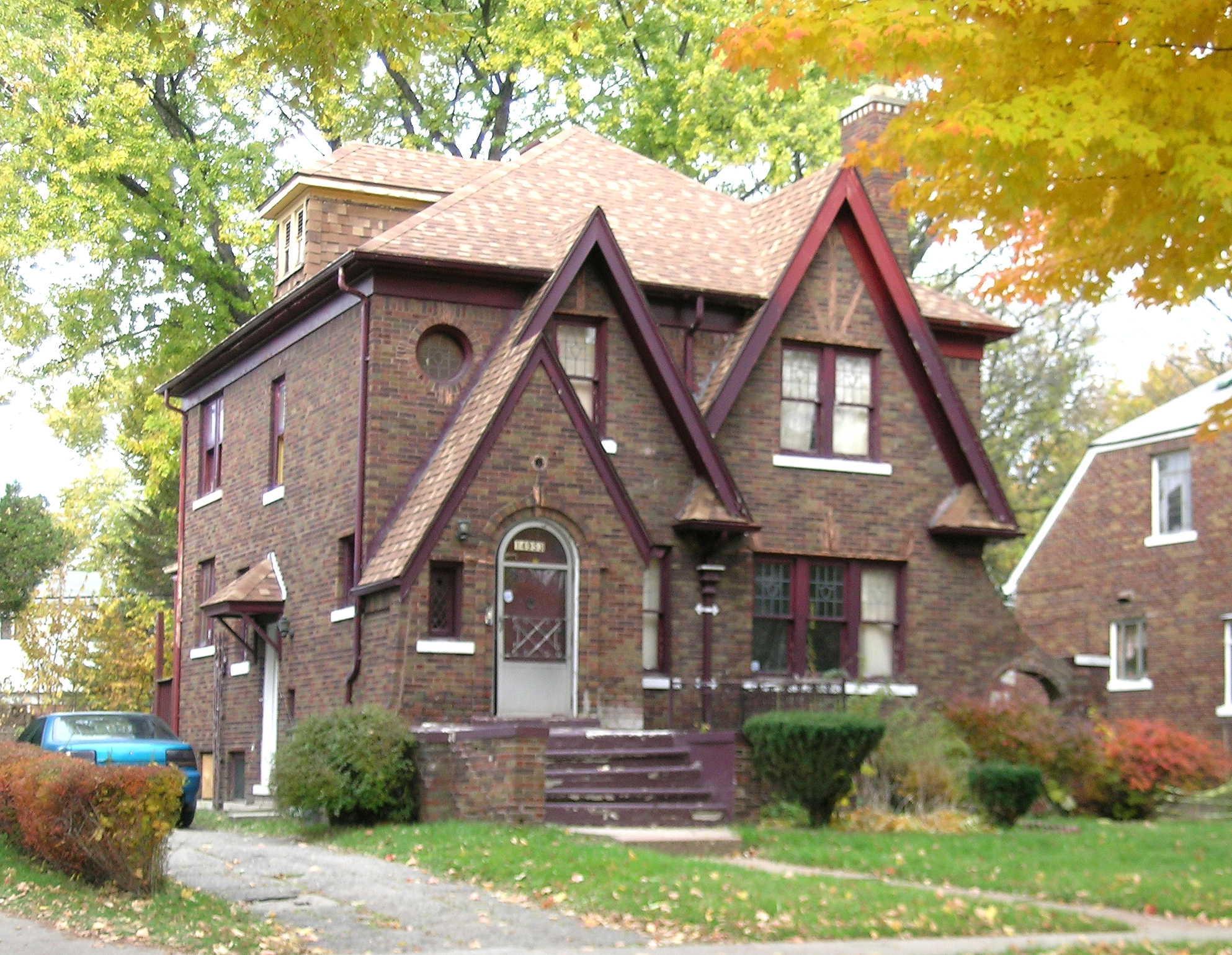
House on Glastonbury
