= Rosedale Park =

Rosedale Park may refer to:

- Rosedale Park (Kansas City, Kansas), park in Kansas City, Kansas
- Rosedale Park, park which once contained Rosedale Field, a grandstand stadium in Toronto, Ontario, Canada
- Rosedale Park Historic District (Detroit, Michigan)
- Rosedale Park, New Zealand, in Auckland, New Zealand. Home ground of Albany United association football club
