= Chazz (name) =

Chazz is an English masculine given name and nickname that is a diminutive form of Charles. Notable people with this name include the following:

== Nickname ==
- Chazz Miller, nickname of Charles Miller (born 1963), American street art muralist
- Chazz Palminteri, stagename of Calogero Lorenzo Palminteri (born 1952), American actor, screenwriter, producer and playwright
- Chazz Young, stagename of Charles Young (born 1932), American choreographer

== Given name ==
- Chazz Anderson (born 1989), American football player
- Chazz Surratt (born 1997), American football player
- Chazz Witherspoon (born 1981), American heavyweight boxer
- Chazz Woodson (born 1982), American lacrosse player

== Fictional characters ==
- Chazz Darby, Brendan Fraser character in 1994 film, Airheads
- Chazz Michaels, (Charles Michael Michaels), Will Ferrell character in 2007 film, Blades of Glory
- Chazz Princeton, Yu-Gi-Oh! GX character
- Chazz Reinhold, uncredited Will Ferrell character in 2005 film, Wedding Crashers
- Chazz Russell, Matthew Perry character in 1987 TV series Second Chance

== See also ==
- Chanz (disambiguation)
- Chaz
- Chazy (disambiguation)
