= River Rouge (Michigan) =

River in Michigan

River Rouge Rivière Rouge Rouge River
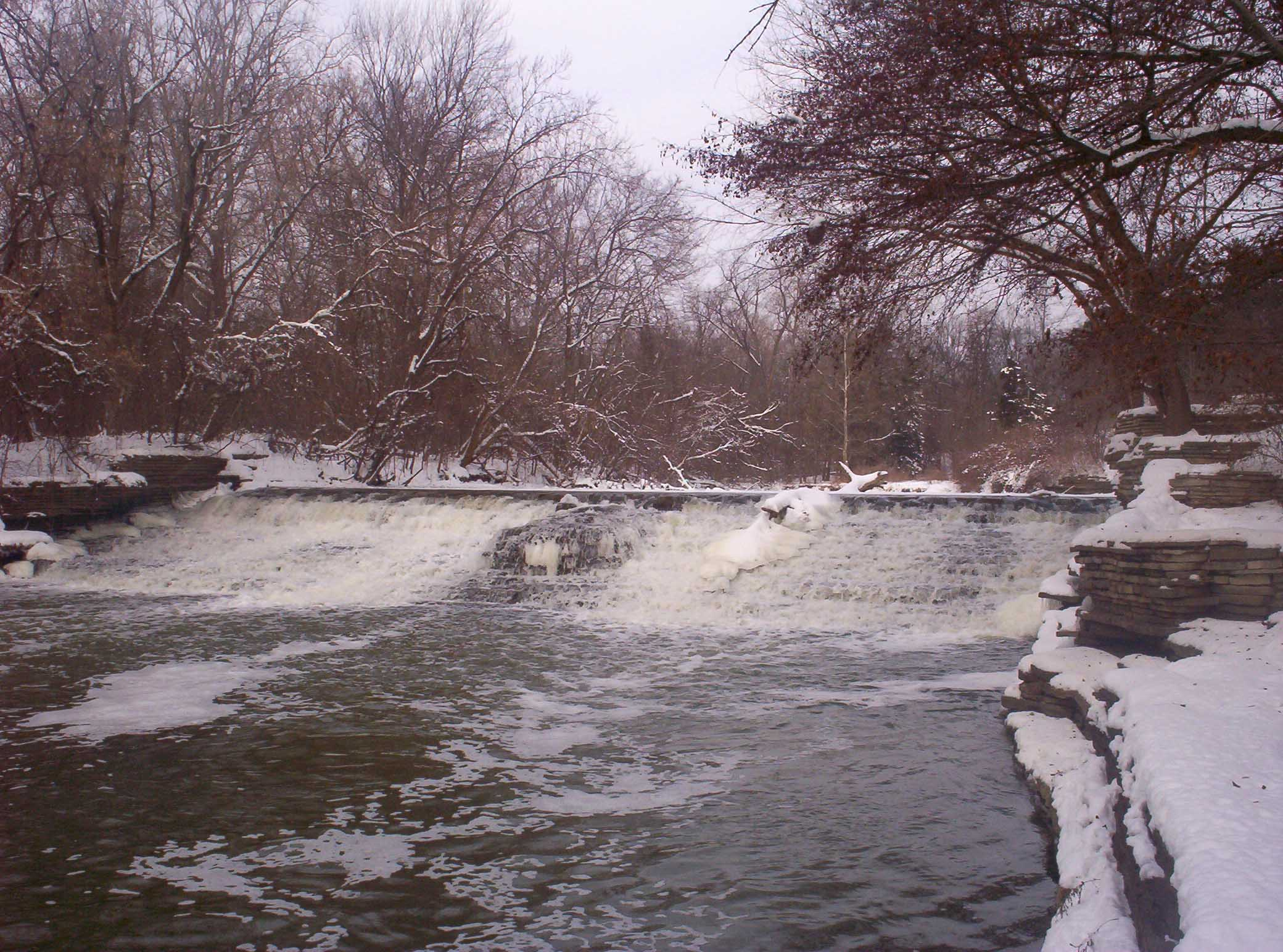
- Man-made falls on the River Rouge at Henry Ford's Fair Lane estate.

- Location of mouth within the state of Michigan

Physical characteristics
- Source
  - location: Rochester Hills, Oakland County, Michigan
  - coordinates: 42.63225°N 83.17632°W
- Mouth
  - location: Detroit River, Michigan
  - coordinates: 42.28809°N 83.1027°W
- Length: 127 mi (204 km)
- Basin size: 467 mi^{2} (1,210 km^{2})
- Discharge
  - location: mouth
  - average: 378.16 cu ft/s (10.708 m^{3}/s) (estimate)

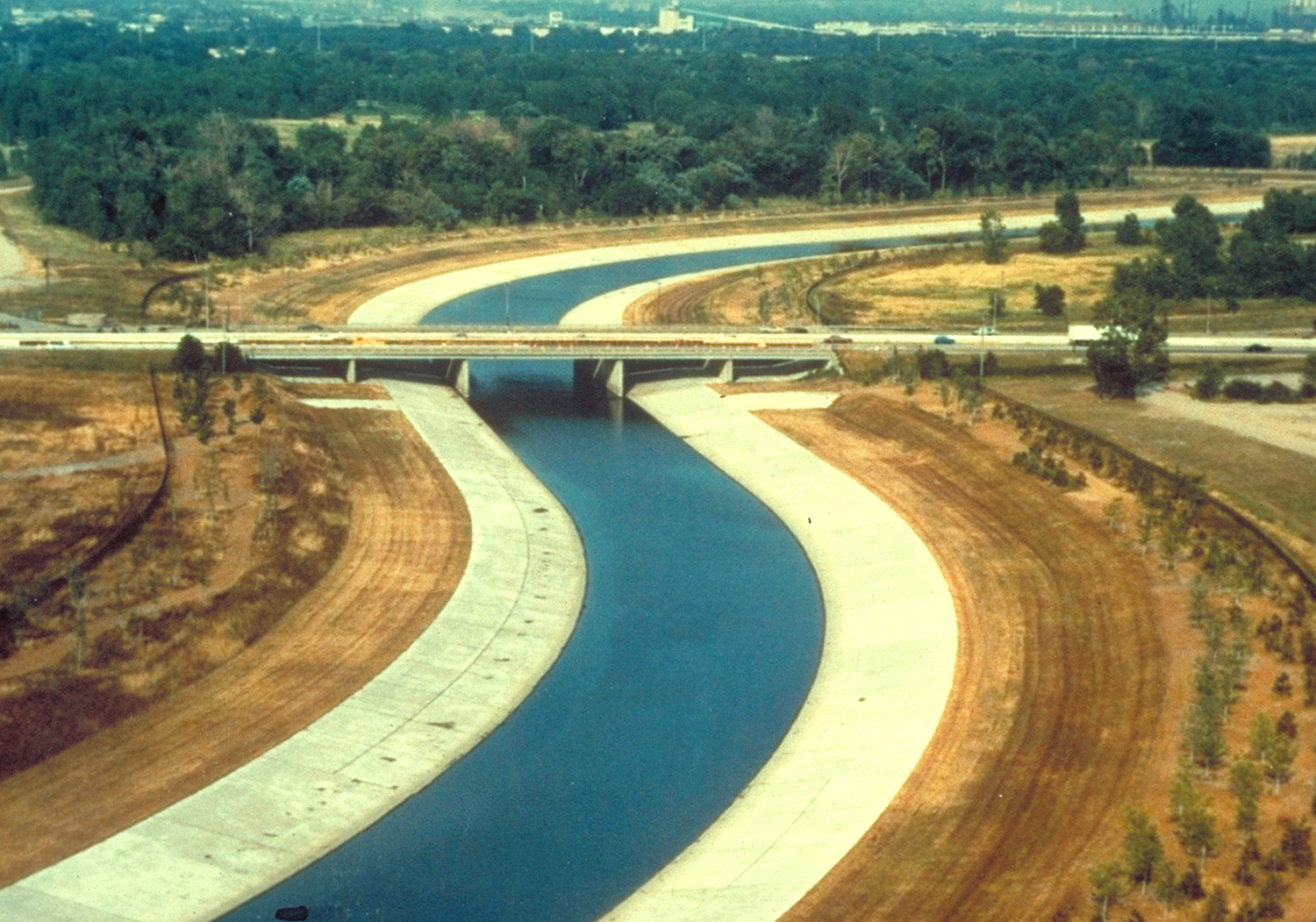
River Rouge in Dearborn. The Southfield Freeway bridge is shown.

The River Rouge is a 127-mile (204 km) river in the Metro Detroit area of southeastern Michigan. It flows into the Detroit River at Zug Island, which is the boundary between the cities of River Rouge and Detroit.

The river's roughly 467-square-mile (1,210 km^{2}) watershed includes all or parts of 48 municipalities, with a total population of more than 1.35 million, and it drains a large portion of central and northwest Wayne County, as well as much of southern Oakland County and a small area in eastern Washtenaw County. Nearly the entire drainage basin is in urban and suburban areas, with areas of intensive residential and industrial development. Still, more than 50 miles (80 km) of the River Rouge flow through public lands, making it one of the most accessible rivers in the state.

Until the late 20th century, the lowest section of the river, which is channeled for freight, was heavily polluted, and in 1969 oil on the surface caught fire. The passage of the Clean Water Act in 1972 made it unlawful to discharge any pollution from a point source into navigable waters, and the EPA's National Pollution Discharge Elimination Program was created to regulate these discharges.

In 1986, a non-profit organization of concerned citizens called Friends of the Rouge was formed and began organizing an annual cleanup called Rouge Rescue, to raise awareness about the need to clean up the Rouge. In 1987, the entire watershed was designated a Great Lakes "area of concern" under the Great Lakes Water Quality Agreement.

In 1992, a massive project called the River Rouge National Wet Weather Demonstration Project was implemented, and further cleanup measures are ongoing. The Alliance of Rouge Communities is an organization of governmental and non-governmental entities created in 2006 to manage the watershed.

== Physical and natural aspects ==
The River Rouge totals 127 miles (204 km) in length and is divided into four branches, the main, upper, middle, and lower branches. The upper branch flows into the main branch in western Detroit within the historic Eliza Howell Park, just east of Redford Township, near the intersection of U.S. Highway 24 and Interstate 96. The middle branch enters the main branch in Dearborn Heights just north of the boundary with Dearborn. The lower branch joins less than two miles (3.2 km) downstream in Dearborn.

The lower 1.5 miles (2.4 km) of the river south of Michigan Avenue were channelized, widened, and dredged to allow freighter access to the Ford River Rouge complex inland factory facilities. The plant was built between 1915 and 1927. It was the first manufacturing facility for automobiles that included within the plant virtually everything needed to produce the cars: blast furnaces, an open hearth mill, a steel rolling mill, a glass plant, a huge power plant, and an assembly line. During the 1930s, some 100,000 workers were employed here. The plant has been designated as a National Historic Landmark.

=== Main branch ===
The headwaters of the main branch rise in the southwest corner of Rochester Hills and the northeast corner of Bloomfield Township. It flows mostly south through the western part of Troy, and then flows southwest through Birmingham, a noncontiguous portion of Bloomfield Township, Beverly Hills, the southeast corner of Bingham Farms, and Southfield. It then flows mostly south through western Detroit and Dearborn Heights, then turns southeast in Dearborn and continues along the northern edges of Allen Park, Melvindale, River Rouge and the southern edge of Detroit. Other municipalities that are part of the main branch watershed are Auburn Hills, Bloomfield Hills, Farmington, Farmington Hills, Franklin, Lathrup Village, Oak Park, Orchard Lake, Pontiac, Southfield Township, and West Bloomfield Township.

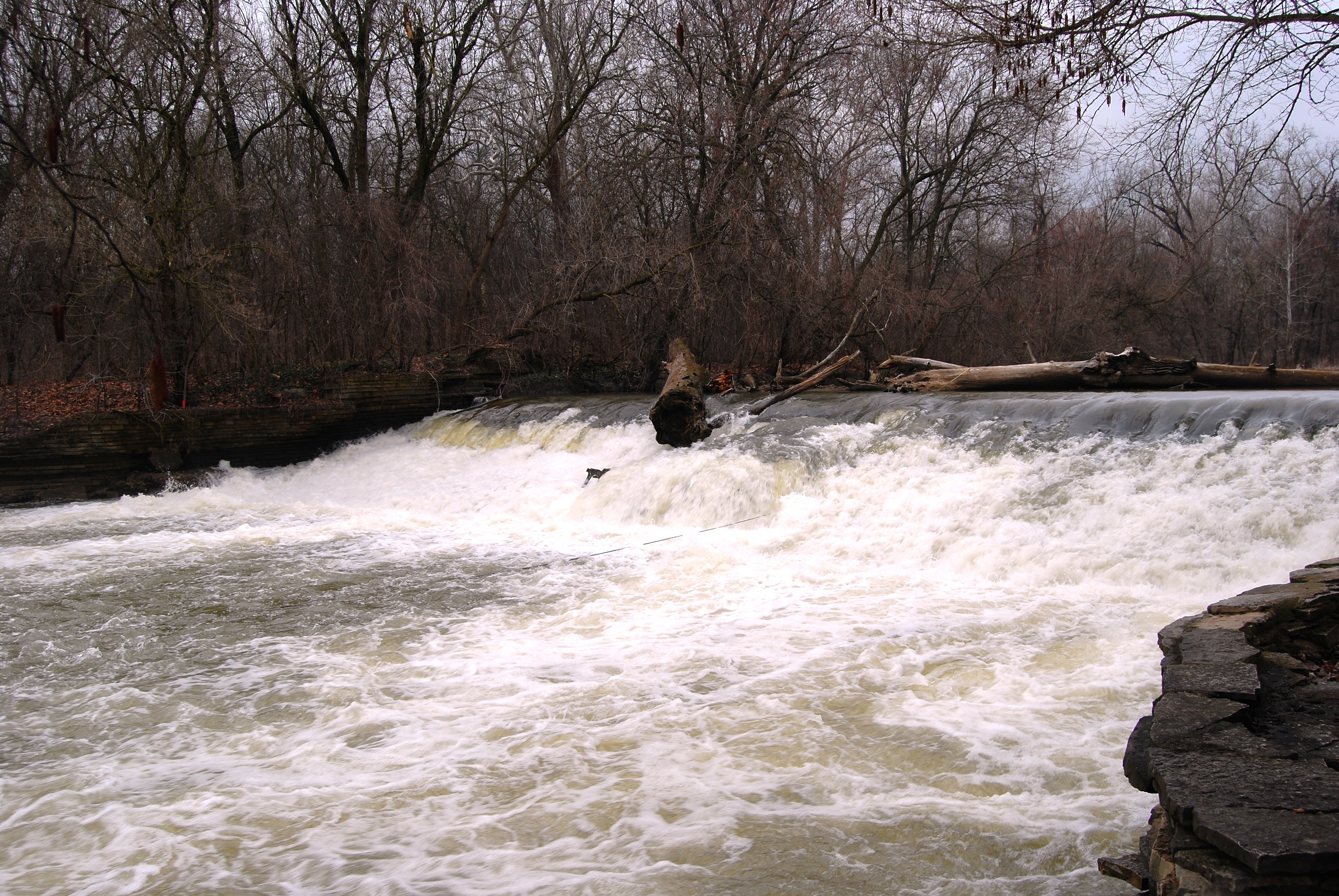
Henry Ford used hydropower dams, like this one on the Rouge electrifying his estate, to power several "Village Industries"

Major tributaries of the main branch include:

- Franklin River (also known as the Franklin branch of the River Rouge)
- Farmbrook Branches (flow off river into two rivers running into Farmbrook Road & Franklin, Michigan)
- Pebble Creek
  - Pernick Creek
- Evan's Creek
- Upper Branch (see below)
- Ashcroft-Sherwood Drain
- Middle Branch (see below)
- Lower Branch (see below)
- Ruby Creek

=== Upper branch ===
The headwaters of the upper branch rise in southwestern West Bloomfield Township, the southeast corner of Commerce Township, and the northeast corner of Novi. It forms in Farmington Hills with the confluence of Minnow Pond Drain and Seeley Drain, where it flows mostly southeast through Farmington, Livonia, Redford Township and enters the main branch in Eliza Howell park, in western Detroit.

Tributaries of the upper branch include (from downriver to upriver)

- Bell Branch
  - Show Drain
  - Blue Drain
  - Bell Drain
  - Tarabusi Creek
- Smith Drain
- Minnow Pond Drain
- Seeley Drain

=== Middle branch ===
The middle branch forms in Northville in northwest Wayne County with the confluence of the "Walled Lake branch" and Johnson Drain. The Walled Lake branch rises in Novi in a marshy drainage area south of Walled Lake, in southwest Oakland County. Johnson Drain rises in Salem Township in northeast Washtenaw County. From Northville, the middle branch flows south through Northville Township and Plymouth Township before turning to the southeast in the city of Plymouth. From Plymouth, it continues through the southwest corner of Livonia into Westland, then along the northern edge of Garden City and into Dearborn Heights where it merges with the main branch near the southern boundary with Dearborn. Other municipalities that are part of the middle branch watershed are Canton Township, Commerce Township, Farmington, Farmington Hills, Lyon Township, Redford Township, and Wixom.

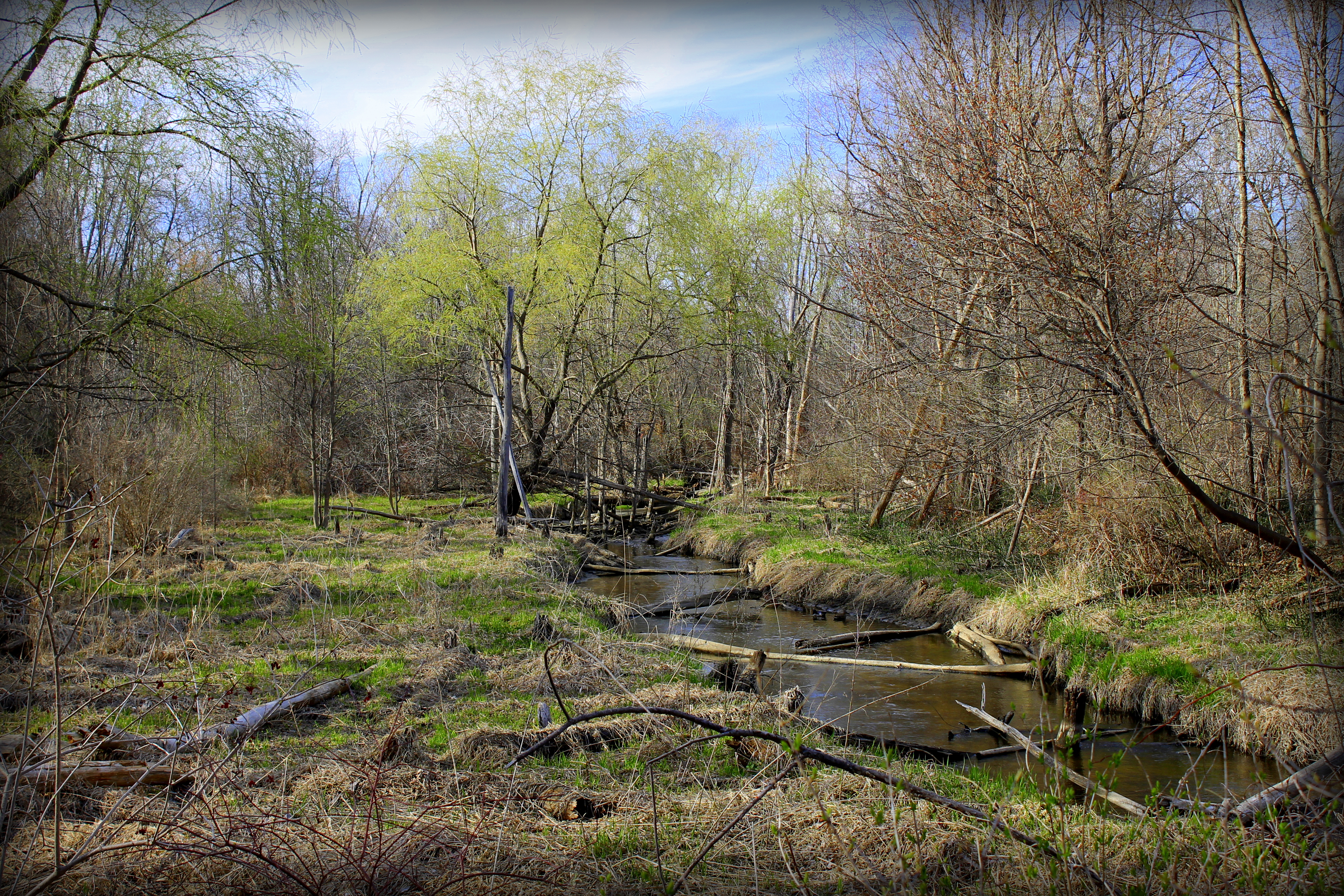
Ingersol Creek at Novi. Note riparian buffer. Just outside the frame are a rail line and residential, industrial, and public recreation facilities

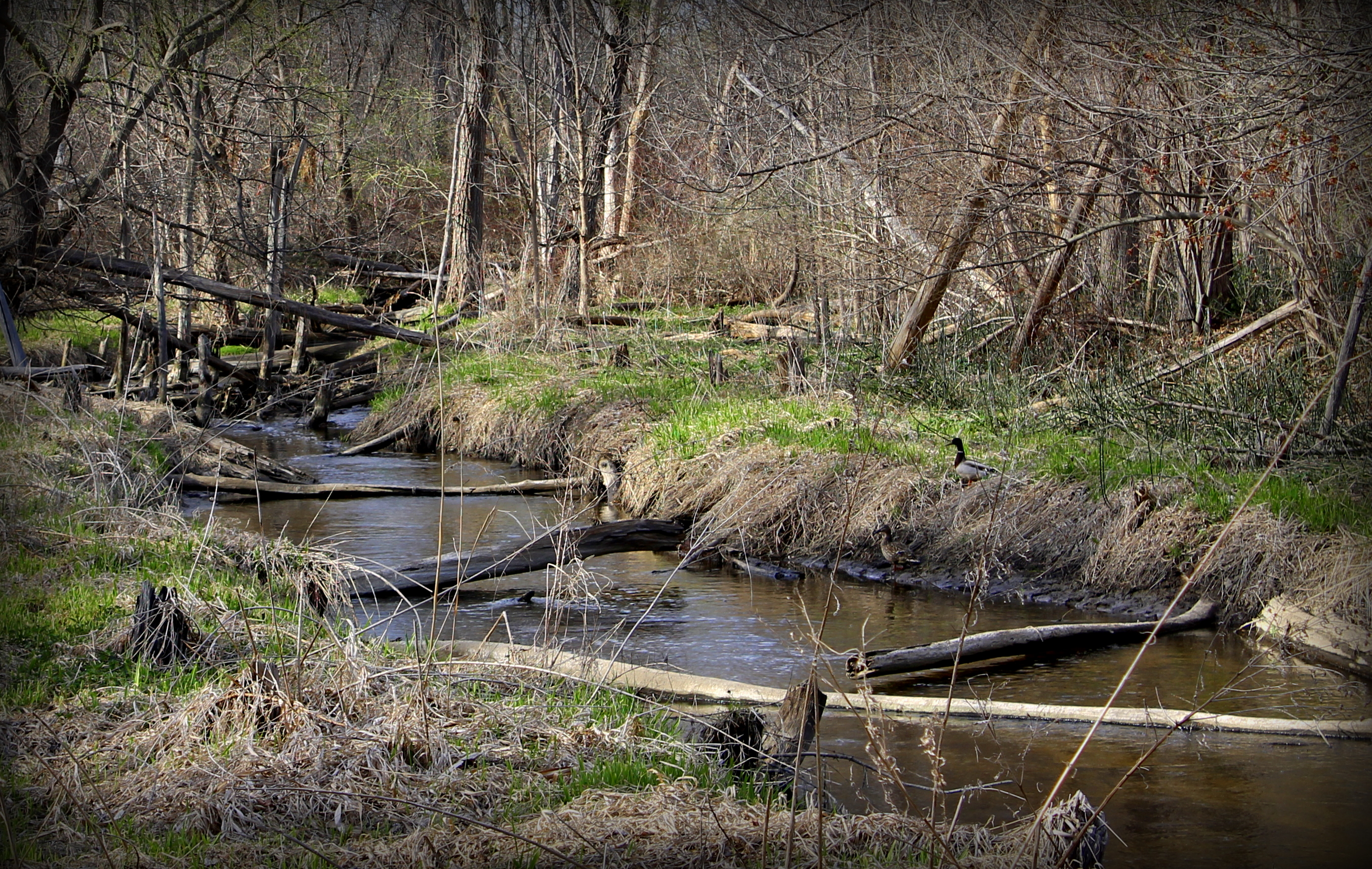
Ingersol Creek at Novi, close-up demonstrating wildlife habitat. At the time of this photo the city had begun tree removal and road construction within the greater riparian zone.

Tributaries of the middle branch include (from downriver to upriver)

- Bill's Drain
- Red Run Drain
- Wilson Drain
- Tonquish Creek
  - Willow Creek
- Johnson Drain
- Walled Lake branch
  - Thornton Creek
  - Ingersol Creek
    - Bishop Creek

=== Lower branch ===
The lower branch rises in sections 11 and 12 in Superior Township in Washtenaw County and flows mostly eastward into Wayne County through Canton Township, Wayne, Westland, Inkster, Dearborn Heights and Dearborn before joining the main branch. Other communities in the lower branch watershed include Van Buren Township, Plymouth Township, Salem Township, Ypsilanti Township.

Tributaries include (from downriver to upriver):

- Hunter Drain
- Hannan Drain
- Fellows Creek
- McKinstry Drain
- Sinds Drain
- Fowler Creek
- Parks Drain

== Area of concern ==
The U.S.-Canada Great Lakes Water Quality Agreement defines an area of concern (AOC) as "geographic areas designated by the parties where significant impairment of beneficial uses has occurred as a result of human activities at a local level". The EPA and other environmental agencies are working to restore the 27 remaining U.S. AOCs in the Great Lakes Basin Region, including River Rouge. There are 43 AOCs in the Great Lakes Basin total, with the rest in Canada or shared by the two countries.

Over 50% of the land surrounding the River Rouge is used for residential, industrial, and commercial purposes and development pressure continues to increase. Consequently, the river is highly polluted and was designated as a Great Lakes Area of Concern under the Great Lakes Water Quality Agreement in 1987. The designated AOC covers the entire River Rouge watershed including 48 communities that drain 466 square miles (1,210 km^{2}) of southeastern Michigan into the Detroit River. Sources of pollution include municipal and industrial discharges, sewer overflows, and several nonpoint source pollution (e.g., storm water runoff). These activities contaminated river sediments and water with polychlorinated biphenyls (PCBs), heavy metals (e.g., mercury), polycyclic aromatic hydrocarbons (PAHs), oil and grease. These contaminants are known to be harmful to fish and wildlife and affect recreational activities.

A 2008 remedial action plan for the AOC identified nine "beneficial use impairments" associated with the pollution:

- Restrictions on fish and wildlife consumption, due to harmful PCBs, PAHs, and heavy metals in sediments and water.
- Eutrophication or undesirable algae, resulting from excessive nutrient runoff (particularly phosphorus) from industrial and agricultural activities.
- Degradation on fish and wildlife populations
- Beach closings, due to potential human health effects from body contact with the water
- Fish tumors or other deformities, that can be caused by chemical contaminants
- Degradation of aesthetics
- Degradation of benthos, which form the base of aquatic food webs
- Restriction on dredging activities
- Loss of fish and wildlife habitat

== Parks and recreation ==
=== Eliza Howell Park ===
The 250-acre (100 ha) Eliza Howell Park includes 138 acres (56 ha) donated to the city of Detroit in 1936.

=== Edward N. Hines Park ===
Hines Park is a 2,300-acre (930 ha) linear park along the entire course of the Middle Rouge, from Northville to Dearborn. Hines Park, named for Wayne County Road Commissioner Edward N. Hines, provides numerous recreation opportunities along the Middle Rouge, and also provides flood control for the flood-prone river.

=== Fair Lane ===
Henry Ford built an estate, Fair Lane, on the river in Dearborn, upriver from the manufacturing plant, on what is now the campus of the University of Michigan–Dearborn. The estate is now a National Historic Landmark. The master plan and gardens were designed by landscape architect Jens Jensen. A portion of the estate's grounds are a preserved historic landscape and more of it is held as a nature study area since 1956. The residence is now a museum and open to the public.

=== The Henry Ford and Greenfield Village ===
The Henry Ford, billed as "America's Greatest History Attraction", is a major tourist destination in the area. It includes Greenfield Village, which was opened in 1929 to preserve historic landmarks, including Noah Webster's House, Thomas Edison's Menlo Lab and the garage where Henry Ford built the Quadricycle, his first car.

=== River Rouge Bird Observatory ===
Since 1992 the River Rouge Bird Observatory has operated on the campus of University of Michigan-Dearborn.

=== River Rouge Gateway Greenway Trail ===
The trail has access points from Michigan Avenue in Dearborn, from Fair Lane and from the University of Michigan Dearborn campus. There is an aspiration to develop the greenway trail all the way to the Detroit River.

=== Rouge Park ===
Rouge Park has been operated by the city of Detroit since the 1920s. Its boundary is formed by the railway to the north and West Warren to the south and by Outer Drive, West Parkway and Parkland on the west and Trinity and Burt Road on the east. In July 2014, two Olympic-sized pools and a bath house were reopened at Rouge Park as part of a $5.5 million park renovation project. Covering 1,184-acre (479 ha), Rouge Park is the largest park in the city. In contrast, the more well-known Belle Isle State Park of Detroit covers 982 acres (397 ha).

=== Other notable parks and recreation areas ===
- Lower Rouge Parkway
- Douglas Evans Nature Preserve
- Lola Valley Park
- Rouge Valley Parkway
- Belle Creek Park
- Ford Field Park
