= Eliza Howell Park =

Public park in Brightmoor, Detroit, Michigan

Coordinates: 42.3999°N 83.2733°W

Eliza Howell Park is a public park in Brightmoor, Detroit, Michigan. The park lies just north of Rouge Park and contains the confluence point between the upper and main Rouge River branches. Howell Park, east of Telegraph Road between Fenkell Avenue and Schoolcraft Avenue, has 250 acres (100 ha) of land, making it the fourth largest park in Detroit; this is about one fourth of the area of Belle Isle or .25 square miles (0.65 km^{2}). A greenway links Howell with Stoepel Park. Howell has a 1.5-mile (2.4 km) nature trail that, in 2009, was recently constructed.

== History ==
The family of Eliza Howell, a real estate developer in Metro Detroit, gave 138 acres (56 ha) of that land to the City of Detroit in the 1936. The 1936 deed restriction states that the city is required to maintain the land as a public park.

In the Spring of 2009 the City of Detroit stopped mowing Howell and other parks in order to save money.

In 2010 Chazz Miller, a Detroit artist, and several volunteers painted plywood cutouts of butterflies as part of the "Papillion Effect ("Papillon" is French for butterfly"), an anti-blight campaign. Miller added several butterflies to the nature trail at Howell Park.

=== Kenneth Cheyne lawsuit ===
In August 2008, Howell Park Properties, the family owned business of Kenneth "Ken" Cheyne; a 65-year-old developer from Beverly Hills, Michigan, and a grandson of Eliza Howell; filed a lawsuit against the City of Detroit in circuit court, stating that the city is violating the deed restriction by not maintaining the park. Cheyne further argued that the city had willfully abandoned the park. Therefore, the city would have to return the Howell ownership back to the family. Officials from the City of Detroit said that Howell is still a park open to the public. Cheyne planned to convert the park into commercial development. MacDonald said "But the 138 acres that Cheyne lays claim to are the most suitable for redevelopment, since much of the city's share is in a flood plain." One week after The Detroit News reported on the lawsuit, the City of Detroit placed concrete barricades around the park.

Cheyne said that he had proposed developing commercial and residential properties to the administration of the Mayor of Detroit Kwame Kilpatrick by releasing the deed restrictions. Cheyne said that he proposed keeping 70% of the park as parkland and developing 30% of the park. Cheyne said that the staff members suggested that he hire the consultant they had selected, but Cheyne ignored that suggestion. According to Cheyne, for several years, the city never called back.

By 2011 the City had won in the legal challenge. Cheyne said that he was going to appeal the verdict.

In 2012 Cheyne was still maintaining the legal challenge. Cheyne said that "Last year, they mowed it once or twice. There are wild dogs that run in there. It isn’t treated like a park. It’s like a stepchild in a way. Nobody cared for it."

== Composition ==
The park includes an American football field with goal posts. As of 2009 there is a lot of rusted and broken playground equipment. Wooded areas and vacant fields make up large portions of the park. That year, Christine MacDonald of The Detroit News said "Nature has reclaimed much of the park, turning it into a de facto preserve, and some say that's a beautiful thing."

The city had stopped mowing the park in 2009 to save money. Riet Schumack, a Brightmoor resident quoted in MacDonald's article, said that visitors often see coyotes, deer, foxes, blue herons, and great horned owls; and that Indian pipe and trillium grow in the park.
