= Don Anderson (American football) =

American football player (born 1963)

No. 36, 23
- Position: Cornerback

Personal information
- Born: July 8, 1963 (age 63); Detroit, Michigan, U.S.
- Listed height: 5 ft 10 in (1.78 m)
- Listed weight: 196 lb (89 kg)

Career information
- High school: Cody (Detroit)
- College: Purdue
- NFL draft: 1985: 2nd round, 32nd overall pick

Career history
- Indianapolis Colts (1985); San Francisco 49ers (1987)*; Tampa Bay Buccaneers (1987)
- * Offseason or practice squad member only

Awards and highlights
- Second-team All-American (1984)

Career NFL statistics
- Interceptions: 1
- Fumble recoveries: 1
- Stats at Pro Football Reference

Donald Cortez Anderson (born July 8, 1963) is an American former professional football player who was a cornerback in the National Football League (NFL) for the Indianapolis Colts and Tampa Bay Buccaneers. He played college football for the Purdue Boilermakers.

== Early life ==
Anderson was born and raised in Detroit, Michigan and attended Cody High School. He accepted a football scholarship from Purdue University, where he became a three-year starter. He tied the school record with 11 career interceptions. As a senior, he was honored by the Newspaper Enterprise Association (NEA) as a second-team All-American.

== Professional career ==
Anderson was selected by the Indianapolis Colts in the second round (32nd overall) of the 1985 NFL draft. He was limited with injuries, appearing in five games as a backup cornerback, while making one interception and one forced fumble. He was released on August 26, 1986.

On March 30, 1987, he was signed as a free agent by the San Francisco 49ers. He was released on August 28.

On September 16, 1987, he was signed as a free agent by the Tampa Bay Buccaneers, to replace an injured Vito McKeever. He appeared in 11 games as a backup cornerback and recovered one fumble, during the strike shortened season. He was released before the start of the 1988 season.
