= Chazz Miller =

American painter

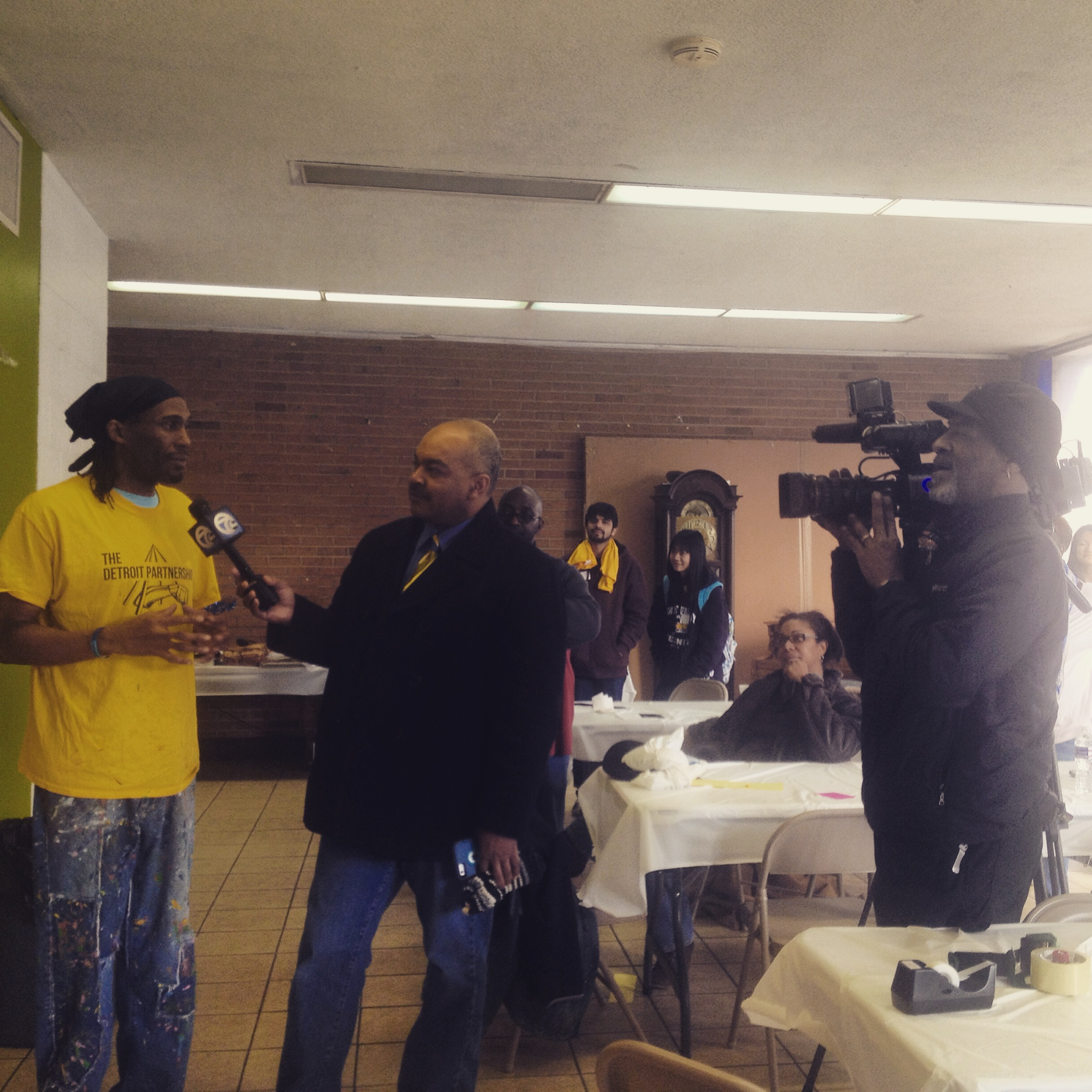
- Charles "Chazz" Miller being interviewed by Detroit Local News.
- Born: Detroit, Michigan, U.S.
- Education: Columbus College of Art and Design (1981-1986)
- Known for: Painting
- Movement: Muralist and Street Art

Charles "Chazz" Miller is an American street art muralist from Detroit, Michigan. He is the founder of the Artist Village, a program of Motor City Blight Busters, a nonprofit organization located in Old Redford aimed at stabilizing and revitalizing Detroit communities.

Chazz is also the founder of Detroit Public Art Workz (PAWZ), which is an initiative to stimulate community growth by providing a creative outlet for Detroit youth with the intention of instilling an appreciation of the Arts.

== Biography ==
Miller grew up in the inner city of Detroit, and showed an early interest in art. Therefore he moved to Columbus, Ohio to study painting and advertising at the Columbus College of Art and Design (1981-1986).

Miller's first significant urban renewal project was the Artist Village, where he occupied an artist studio. As part of his "urban beautification" work he painted murals on exterior walls of the Artist Village complex, as well as other buildings in the neighbourhood.

== Social Impact ==
Miller's first project, PAWZ, provides art programs and positive role models to more than 1000 inner city children per year. The program was commissioned by the City of Detroit to create an art installation in the Brightmoor neighbourhood, also involving the youth in the creation.

In 2010 Chazz Miller and several volunteers painted plywood cutouts of butterflies as part of an anti-blight campaign called the "Papillion Effect" ("Papillon" is French for butterfly). Miller added several butterflies to the nature trail at Eliza Howell Park.
