= Brightmoor, Detroit =

Neighborhood of Detroit, Michigan

Brightmoor
- Neighborhood of Detroit
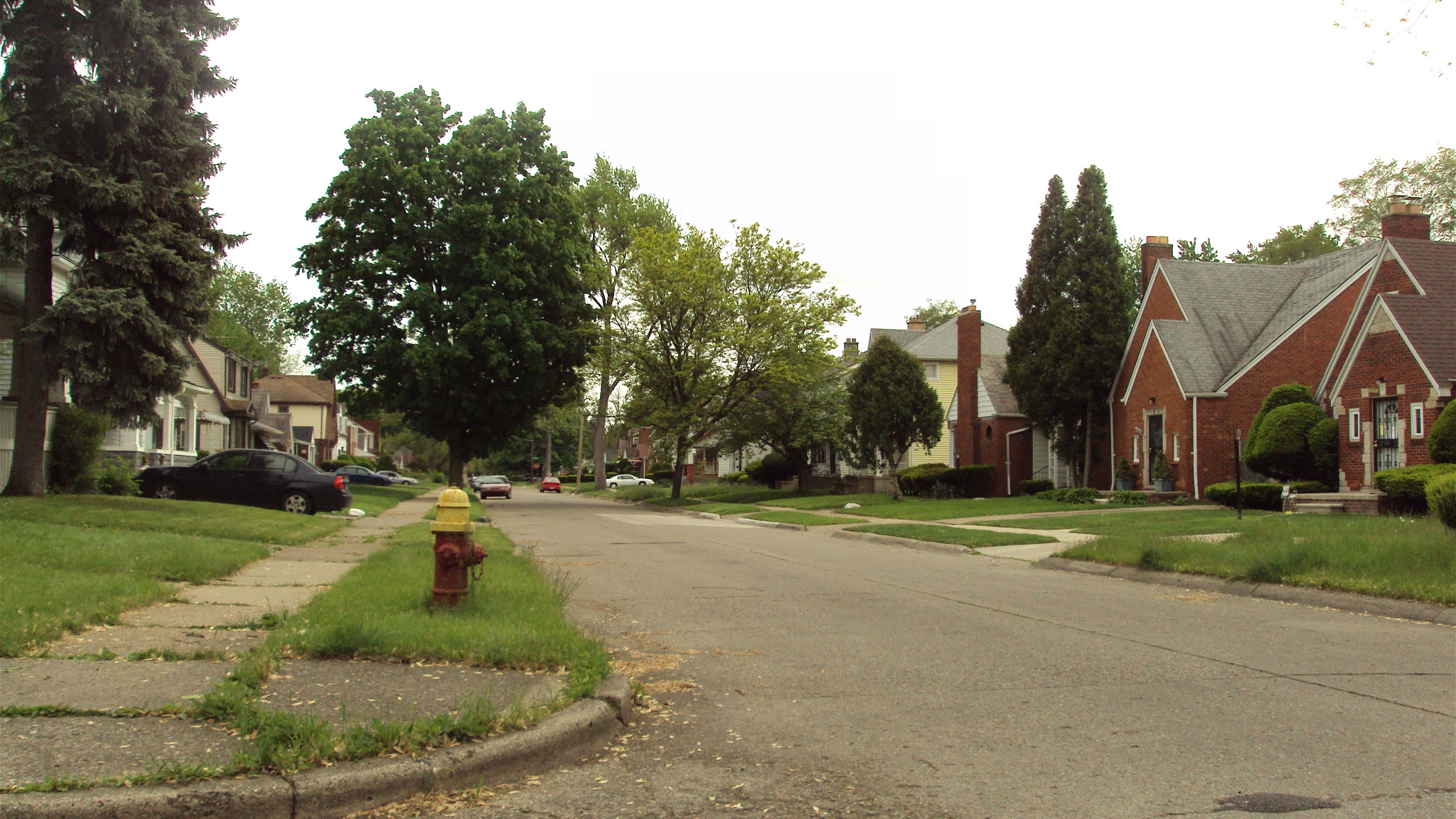

- Location of Brightmoor within the city of Detroit Location of Brightmoor in the state of Michigan
- Coordinates: 42°23′47″N 83°14′43″W
- Country: United States of America
- State: Michigan
- County: Wayne
- City: Detroit
- Organized: 1922
- Annexed by Detroit: 1926

Area
  - Total: 3.9 sq mi (10 km^{2})
  - Land: 3.9 sq mi (10 km^{2})
  - Water: 0.0 sq mi (0 km^{2})

Population (2020)
  - Total: 11,099
  - Density: 2,845.8/sq mi (1,098.8/km^{2})
- Time zone: UTC-5 (EST)
  - Summer (DST): UTC-4 (EDT)
- ZIP code(s): 48223
- Area code: 313

Brightmoor is a neighborhood located in Detroit, Michigan, near the northwest border of the city. Brightmoor is defined by the Brightmoor Alliance as being bordered by Puritan Avenue to the north, the CSX railway to the south, Evergreen Road to the east, and West Outer Drive, Dacosta Street, and Telegraph Road to the west. However, the demographics given here for the neighborhood are the city's statistical Master Plan Neighborhood area, which consists of eight census tracts that includes some areas outside of the Alliance's boundaries, but does not include some areas within its boundaries.

== History ==
In 1921, developer Burt Eddy Taylor bought 160 acres (0.65 km^{2}) of land in Redford Township, located one mile (1.6 km) away from Detroit's city limits at the time. Taylor created Brightmoor as a planned community of inexpensive housing for migrants from the Southern United States in the early 1920s. The subdivision opened in 1922. B. E. Taylor recruited workers from Appalachia with the lure of employment at one of Detroit's expanding automobile manufacturing plants. An additional 2,913 acres (1,179 ha) was added to the community between 1923 and 1924. Most of the residents worked in the automobile industry. Model d has described Brightmoor as a neighborhood where families could own a house and live in modest comfort. The City of Detroit annexed Brightmoor in 1926. The houses were intended as affordable single-family housing. At the time of the community's opening, many residents lived in temporary shantytowns awaiting the completion of their permanent houses.

In a 40-year period until 2011, the number of residents in Brightmoor decreased. Crime appearing in the 1990s and 2000s caused additional residents to leave. In 2011 Suzette Hackney and Kristi Tanner of the Detroit Free Press said that the area, "over decades, transformed from a thriving working-class neighborhood to one of abandoned homes and businesses, and now one that is hoping to come back, mostly through private-sector efforts." In 2009 John Carlisle (DetroitBlogger John) of the Metro Times said "Ghetto stereotypes thrive here—broad-daylight drug dealing, pre-teen pregnancies, long-gone or never-known fathers, and houses falling apart or giving way to vacant lots", though many non-profit agencies aimed to assist the population of Brightmoor. In the same year, urban gardens had been established in the neighborhood.

In June 2013 the nonprofit organization Detroit Blight Authority began a cleanup effort of trash from a fourteen city block area, bounded by Lyndon, West Outer Drive, and Trinity Streets and with Eaton Avenue splitting the area laterally. 500 residential lots are located in the area cleaned by the Detroit Blight Authority. The cleanup zone had about 70 vacant structures, with several houses that had received damages from burns and those ransacked by intruders. The authority, with the Detroit Rescue Mission Ministries and Mitch Albom Charities, organized the Blight Elimination—100 Houses Event in August 2013.

== Geography ==
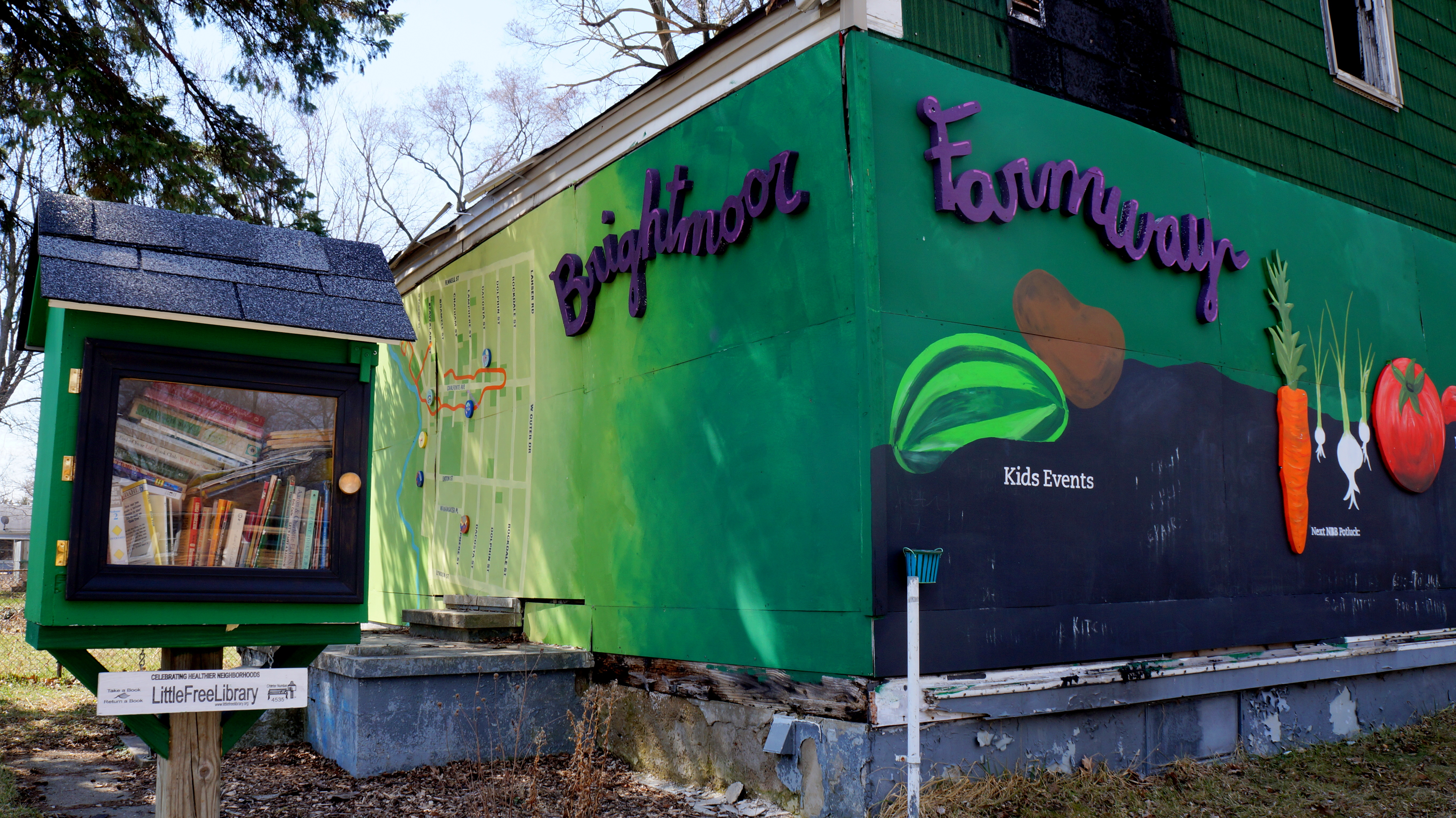
A home in Brightmoor painted with a map of the neighborhood. A community "free library" can be seen in the yard.

Brightmoor is located in northwest Detroit, and generally bordered by Evergreen Road, Telegraph Road, Puritan Avenue, and Interstate 96.

The Brightmoor Alliance under the City Connect Detroit organization define the boundary of Brightmoor as approximately 4 square miles (10 km^{2}) in Detroit's northwest section. The Alliance defines the neighborhood as being bordered by Puritan Road to the north, the CSX railway to the south, Evergreen Road to the east, and Telegraph Road, Dacosta Street, and Outer Drive West to the west.

The statistical definition for the neighborhood as defined in the city's master plan includes a larger area than the Alliance's definition. In this definition, Brightmoor is bordered by several other master neighborhoods: Redford to the north, Rosedale to the northeast Cerveny/Grandmont to the east, and Cody to the south. To the west lies the autonomous Redford Charter Township. However, Detroit properties along Telegraph Road are generally not considered part of the Brightmoor neighborhood.

=== Cityscape ===
In 2014, Rollo Romig of The New Yorker wrote "Much of Brightmoor matches what Detroit looks like in the popular imagination—an alarming amalgam of city dump, crime scene, and wild prairie". As a result, the neighborhood's nickname had been "Blight More". The neighborhood's frightening reputation was the point of departure for the 2022 horror film Barbarian, which takes place there.

== Demographics ==
Historical population
Census	Pop.	Note	%±
1990	23,775		—
2000	19,837		−16.6%
2010	12,836		−35.3%
2020	11,099		−13.5%
U.S. Decennial Census

In 1990, the neighborhood had 23,775 people. At the time 12% of the population consisted of senior citizens.

In 2000, the neighborhood had 19,837 residents, a 16.5% decrease from the 1990 figure. Of that, 37.2% of Brightmoor's population was under 18 years of age, and 5.3% was over the age of 64 years of age.

In 2010, the neighborhood's population had fallen to 12,836, a drop of 35.3% over the previous decade. Of that, 29.9% of the population was under 18 years of age, and 12.7% was over 64 years of age.

== Government and infrastructure ==
Brightmoor is located in:

- Detroit City Council District 1
- State House District 16
- State Senate District 6
- U.S. Congressional District 12

The Brightmoor Post Office of the United States Postal Service is located at 20615 Fenkell Street.

Rosa Parks Memorial Highway (I-96) cuts through the southern end of the neighborhood. Brightmoor is served by Detroit Department of Transportation routes 18, 43 & 60.

== Parks and recreation ==
Two area parks, the Eliza Howell Park and Stoepel Park, are in Brightmoor. A greenway links the two parks. Eliza Howell Park, near Fenkell and Telegraph, has 250 acres (100 ha) of land, making it the fourth largest park in Detroit; this is about one fourth of the area of Belle Isle or .25 square miles (0.65 km^{2}). The Cheyne family gave 138 acres (56 ha) of that land to the City of Detroit in the 1930s. The 1936 deed restriction states that the city is required to maintain the land as a public park.

== Education ==
=== Primary and secondary schools ===
==== Public schools ====
Brightmoor is zoned to Detroit Public Schools. Gompers K-8 and Murphy K-8, within Brightmoor, serve Brightmoor for Grades K-8. All residents are zoned to Frank Cody High School, outside of Brightmoor.

The current Gompers Elementary-Middle School, serving Grades PreK-8, opened in 2011. The two-story, Leadership in Energy and Environmental Design (LEED)-certified facility replaced the Gompers, Harding, and Vetal schools and was built on the Harding site for $21.4 million. It has an elementary wing and a middle school wing. The central administration suite, gymnasium, and multi-purpose room are between the two wings.

Schools formerly serving sections of Brightmoor for elementary school include Thomas A. Houghton Elementary K-6th, Don Hubert Elementary, Burt Elementary School, and Harding Elementary School; all of the schools are in Brightmoor. Vetal K-8 also formerly served sections for elementary school. For middle school some residents were zoned to Vetal K-8, Murphy K-8 was previously just a middle school. At one time residents of Brightmoor were zoned to Redford High School.

In 1999 Hubert had 614 students in grades PreK to 5.

==== Private schools ====
City Mission Academy, a private non-denominational Christian school, is located in Brightmoor. Nicole Aikens opened the school in the early 2000s.

== Organizations ==
The Brightmoor Alliance is a group of community organizations that work to coordinate revitalization programs in the neighborhood. Created in 2000, the Brightmoor Alliance meets regularly to discuss programs, events, and partnerships developed by member organizations. The Alliance also works with city officials and large community foundations like the Skillman Foundation to help plan and develop new programs for the neighborhood.

Other organizations in the neighborhood include Brightmoor Community Center, Motor City Blight Busters, Mt. Vernon Baptist Church, Northwest Detroit Neighborhood Development, Neighbors Building Brightmoor The Detroit Partnership, NexusDetroit, Redford Brightmoor Initiative, and 28 other area businesses, community centers, and churches.
