= Mathis Bailey =

American novelist

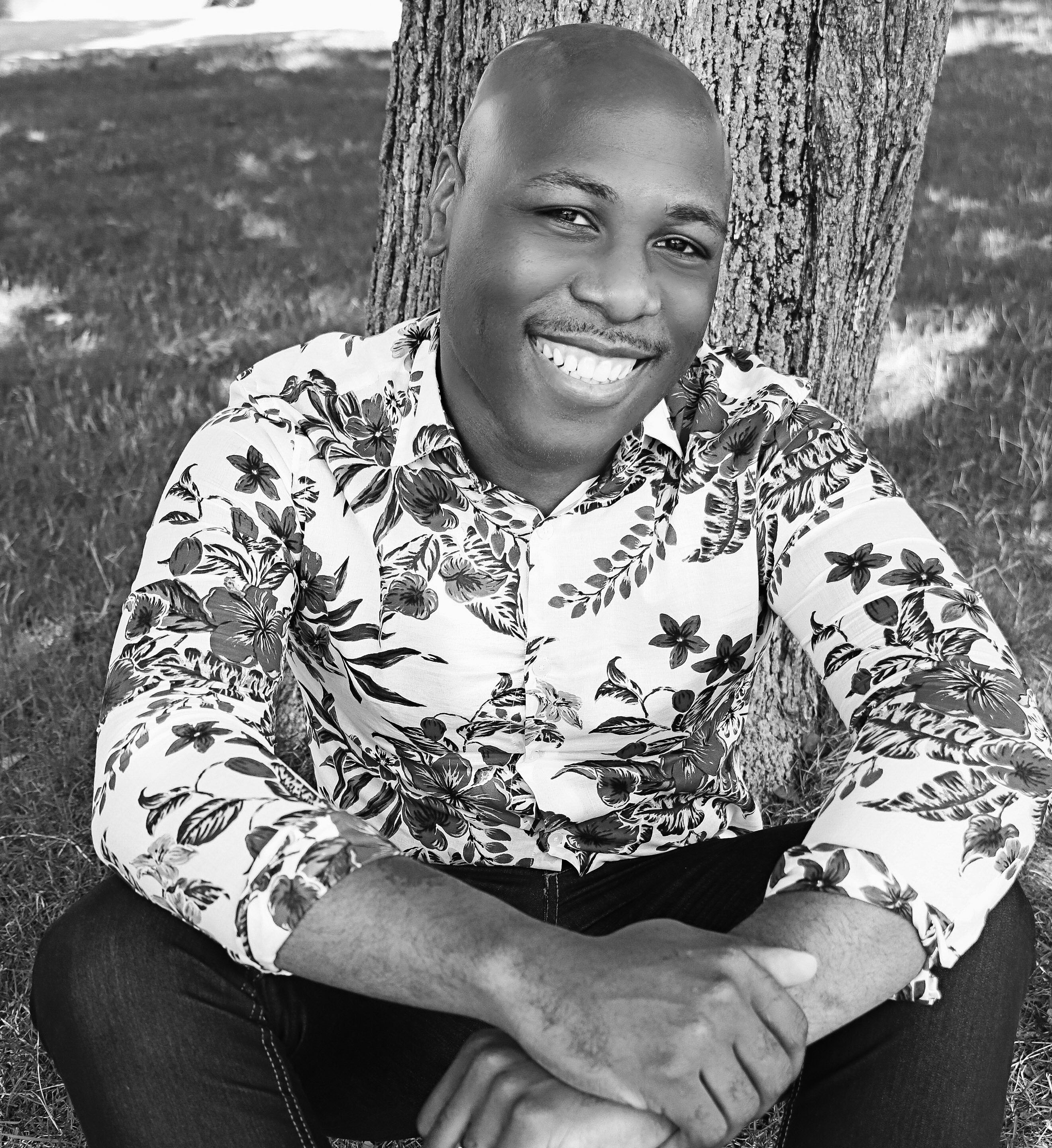
- Mathis Bailey
- Born: Mathis Z'Aire Bailey; December 13, 1981 (age 44); Detroit, Michigan, U.S.
- Education: Journalism
- Alma mater: York University
- Occupation: Author
- Writing career
- Language: English
- Period: 2016-currently
- Genres: LGBTQ, urban, fiction, romance
- Notable works: Confused Spice, Brown Sugar & Spice, Black Truffle & Spice
- Website: mathisbailey.com

Mathis Z'Aire Bailey (born December 13, 1981) is an American–Canadian author and fiction writer based in Toronto, Ontario, Canada.

== Biography ==
Mathis was born in 1981, in Detroit, Michigan, to Deborah Munroe-Bailey and Charles Philip Bailey. He is the middle child of three siblings. His mother was born in Nassau, Bahamas and his father is an American citizen.

His uncle is the late Myles Munroe.

Mathis graduated from Redford High School in Detroit. He moved to Toronto in 2008 where he received his degree in Broadcast journalism at Seneca College and York University. He was a regular writer for York University’s newspaper, Excalibur.

Mathis didn't think of becoming an author until he decided to take a creative writing program to improve his writing chops to write restaurant reviews for the Gulf News. Mathis is the author of LGBT novel Confused Spice which was published in late 2016. The novel was reviewed by Kirkus Reviews, Manhattan Book Review and San Francisco Book Review. According to Kirkus Reviews, "The author beautifully melds the art of cooking with rising romantic desire and examines engaging cultural dynamics". Confused Spice is a story of a twenty-nine-year old man, who dreams of becoming a renowned pâtissier and chef.

Mathis' second novel "Brown Sugar & Spice" is now out. Kirkus Reviews already claims it to be "Warm and engaging." The third book in the series called "Black Truffle and Spice" is due out Early Spring 2022.

== Books ==
- Confused Spice (2016)
- Brown Sugar & Spice (2019)
- Black Truffle & Spice (2022)
