= Chanz =

Chanz may refer to:

- Nadine Chanz

== See also ==
- Chazz (name)
