= City Mission Academy =

Christian private school in Detroit, US

Coordinates: 42°23′09.1″N 83°14′28.4″W

- 20405 Schoolcraft Road; Detroit, MI 48223

Information
- Type: Private
- Established: 1998
- Enrollment: ~40
- Information: (313) 541-3531
- Organization structure: Nonprofit
- Website: missioncity.org

City Mission Academy is a private, non-denominational Christian, charitable organization and K-5 school operating in the community of Brightmoor, Detroit, since 1998.

== History ==
The City Mission program was initiated in 1998 by Nicole Aikens, a former childhood resident of the Brightmoor community and disillusioned social worker who believed that the social welfare system was failing to do enough to break the cycle of generational poverty that she saw in the lives of many people she worked with.

Beginning with seven students and seven volunteer tutors, City Mission began to offer a K-5 school program, mentoring programs, training for life skills, as well as a family development program. Students and their families were also provided with meals and clothing.

The organization claims that their student enrollment has increased from 50 to 100% year after year.

== Programs ==
The programs offered by City Mission Academy are based around a stated "four pillars" approach that includes the K-5 academy, after hours tutoring, leadership development, and family development programs. These programs are implemented in an attempt to provide around the clock support and influence to the Brightmoor neighborhood.

=== Academy ===
City Mission Academy's education program currently encompasses a full K-5 school curriculum, which is intended to replace traditional public school programs students might have previously been enrolled in.

Beyond the basic educational program, the K-5 students are engaged through a series of extra-curricular programs designed to provide alternatives to the frequent negative examples the students are either exposed to or drawn into.

As many families in the Brightmoor community struggle with poverty and cannot afford to pay the basic tuition costs of their children, City Mission Academy operates primarily on donations and fundraising efforts. Parents are still required to make a small payment towards the tuition, or volunteer hours at the academy's facility if they cannot pay.

=== Tutoring and mentoring ===
City Mission Academy operates a tutoring program for elementary students that is designed with personalized assessments and curriculum designed to help increase test scores and grade level proficiencies.

Older students are engaged through a mentoring program that pairs them with adult volunteers with a curriculum based around life skills and character development. The program is available to students in both junior high and high school.

=== Leaders in Training ===
For students that have completed the tutoring and mentoring programs offered by City Mission Academy, the organization offers their LIT (Leaders in Training) Program. The program is described by City Mission as providing alternatives to drugs, gangs, and teen pregnancy. This is accomplished through development of relationships with City Mission staff and volunteers, through the completion of leadership curriculum, compulsory volunteering with youngsters in Homework Club and a program of personal and professional skill development.

=== Family development ===
City Mission Academy assists families in Brightmoor with a program that helps to provide for basic necessities, GED and job preparedness, and training in fiscal responsibility.

== Community involvement ==
To assist in building strong ties with the community of Brightmoor, all staff employed at the academy are required to relocate and live in the Brightmoor area itself.

City Mission Academy is also an official member of the Brightmoor Alliance, an organization of businesses, charities, churches all focused on development and revitalization of the Brightmoor community.

=== Fundraising ===
As City Mission Academy does not charge full tuition for its students or participants in its social outreach programs, the organization is heavily reliant on donations and fundraising events for its operating costs. Funds are solicited through the main website, with an emphasis on investment in individual students.

Other fundraising events include benefit concerts, and golf tournaments.

City Mission Academy has also partnered with alternative giving avenues such as Project 12 Baskets and Shop to Earn.

== Future plans ==
Proposed development for City Mission Academy includes the expansion of the facilities on Schoolcraft Road into a facility that encompasses two floors allowing for potential attendance to grow to two hundred from current levels, along with the building of a full gymnasium for the use of students.
