= Redford High School =

Secondary school in Detroit, Michigan

Coordinates: 42°24′43.4″N 83°15′09.8″W

Information
- Established: September 1921
- Closed: June 2007

Redford High School was a secondary school in Detroit, Michigan. A part of Detroit Public Schools, the school opened in September 1921 and ceased operations in June 2007. Staffed and operated by the Detroit Public Schools beginning in 1926; Redford High School served the sub-communities of Old Redford, Grandmont, Rosedale Park and Brightmoor.

== History ==
Detroit's Redford High down but not broken: Amid heaps of woes, a few fight to save it.]" Detroit Free Press. February 23, 2007. Retrieved on November 13, 2009.</ref> Redford offered university preparatory classes for its students such as Business Law and Fashion merchandising to mention a few.

In December 2006, the Detroit Public School District announced that it planned to close Redford; concerned alumni and parents mounted a valiant yet unsuccessful drive to prevent the closure. The property was purchased by Meijer, Inc., as a site for a future store complex; and the high school was demolished in September 2012.

Detroit's Cooley and Cody High School absorbed much of the attendance area from Redford; including Brightmoor and Grandmont. Henry Ford High School assumed jurisdiction over the remaining northern neighborhoods.

In June 2015, a Meijer store opened on the Redford site. As of 2015, it was Meijer's second Detroit location. This store uses stonework from the former Redford building.

== Athletics ==
The boys' golf team won three consecutive Michigan High School Athletic Association championships (1928, '29, '30). The boys' cross country team won two consecutive Michigan High School Athletic Association championships (1961, '62). The boys' and girls' tennis teams won Michigan High School Athletic Association championships (1988).

== Notable alumni ==
- Edward Biggs. Federal Agent. US Navy Retired.
- Tonya Mosley. American Journalist
- Mathis Bailey, American-Canadian author and fiction writer
- Kevin Belcher NFL player
- Ralph Clayton, former professional American football player
- Michael Dunn, actor
- Raymond D. Dzendzel, was an American politician who was a Democratic member of both houses of the Michigan Legislature between 1955 and 1970
- Gene Hamlin, former American football center in the National Football League
- Dion Harris (basketball), professional basketball player
- Manny Harris, NBA player
- Archie Matsos, retired American football linebacker
- Edward H. McNamara, Wayne County executive
- Michael Netzer, American-Israeli artist best known for his comic book work for DC Comics and Marvel Comics in the 1970s
- Douglas Ramsay, figure skater; died before graduating
- Gary Reed, comics writer
- Triette Reeves, American politician and minister
- Clarke Scholes, American competitive swimmer and Olympic champion
- George C. Scott, actor
- Hal Smith, Major League Baseball catcher 1955-1964 and 1960 World Series hero with Pittsburgh Pirates
- Greg Theakston, American comics artist and illustrator
- Ken Wilson, American sportscaster, known primarily for his many years as a play-by-play announcer of National Hockey League and Major League Baseball games
- Bill Zepp, major league baseball pitcher
- Curtis Duncan, NFL wide receiver with Houston Oilers,
- Mickey Woods (Mickey Wood), Motown singer.
- Aubyn Roberts (Aubyn Henderson), GOAT.
- Lawrence Dean Grattan (Larry), Michigan Man (Michigan Mong).
