= Kevin Belcher (center) =

American football player (1961–2003)

No. 73
- Positions: Center, offensive guard

Personal information
- Born: February 23, 1961; Detroit, Michigan, U.S.
- Died: June 28, 2003 (aged 42); El Paso, Texas, U.S.
- Listed height: 6 ft 3 in (1.91 m)
- Listed weight: 270 lb (122 kg)

Career information
- High school: Redford (Detroit)
- College: UTEP
- NFL draft: 1983: 6th round, 153rd overall pick

Career history
- New York Giants (1983–1985)

Awards and highlights
- Second-team All-WAC (1981)

Career NFL statistics
- Games played: 32
- Games started: 16
- Stats at Pro Football Reference

Kevin Belcher (February 23, 1961 – June 28, 2003) was an American professional football center who played two seasons with the New York Giants of the National Football League (NFL). He played college football for the UTEP Miners and was selected by the Giants in the sixth round of the 1983 NFL draft.

== Early life ==
Kevin Belcher was born on February 23, 1961, in Detroit, Michigan. He attended Redford High School in Detroit.

Belcher enrolled at the University of Texas at El Paso to play college football for the UTEP Miners. He was a three-year letterman from 1980 to 1982.

== Professional career ==
Belcher was selected in the sixth round by the New York Giants with the 153rd pick in the 1983 NFL draft. He played in 32 games, starring sixteen, for the Giants from 1983 to 1984. His career ended when he was involved in a car wreck on January 23, 1985, severing a nerve in his leg and leaving him with many other internal injuries. Belcher was placed on the reserve/non-football injury list on July 21, 1985, and was released on February 12, 1986.

== Personal life ==
Belcher owned several businesses. He died at his home in El Paso, Texas on June 28, 2003.
