= Chazy =

Chazy may refer to:

- Chazy, New York, a town at Lake Champlain, New York, United States
  - Chazy (CDP), New York, a hamlet in the town
- Chazy Formation, a mid-Ordovician limestone deposit in northeastern North America
- Chazy Fossil Reef, Lake Champlain, New York
- Chazy River, the name of two tributaries of Lake Champlain, New York
- Chazy Group, a geologic group in Quebec, Canada
- Jean Chazy (1882–1955), French mathematician

== See also ==
- Chazz (name)
