= Alliance of Rouge Communities =

Nonprofit in Michigan

- Abbreviation: ARC
- Formation: January 2006; 19 years ago
- Tax ID no.: 22-3931720
- Legal status: 501(c)(3)
- Headquarters: Canton, Michigan
- Website: https://www.allianceofrougecommunities.com/

The Alliance of Rouge Communities (ARC) is a Michigan-based 501(c)(3) nonprofit organization dedicated to maintaining water quality around the Rouge River. The ARC comprises 35 cities, towns and villages, along with Wayne, Oakland and Washtenaw counties, along with non-government bodies governments as authorized by Michigan law. It was founded in 2006 and granted 501(c)(3) status in 2011. The ARC is funded through a mix of grants and membership dues applied to the member organisations.
