= Master Plan Neighborhood areas in Detroit =

Human settlement in Michigan, US

Master Plan Neighborhood areas in Detroit are statistical divisions created by the City of Detroit Planning & Development Department and used for urban planning purposes by the city and statistical agencies, charities, non-profits, and other local organizations. The city is divided into 55 neighborhood areas which are further grouped into 10 neighborhood clusters. The neighborhood areas are composed of and based on census tracts.

The master plan neighborhood areas were created with the adoption of the city's current master plan in July 2009, which was a revision of the 1992 master plan. While they are formally and officially referred to, and described as "master plan neighborhoods", the statistical divisions would more accurately be described as neighborhood groups, since they generally include multiple traditional city neighborhoods. The "neighborhood clusters" would more accurately be described as regions, as they were drawn to roughly cover 100,000 residents apiece.

== Master Plan Neighborhood areas ==
=== Cluster 1 ===
- Airport
- Davison
- Grant
- Nolan
- Pershing
- State Fair

=== Cluster 2 ===
- Burbank
- Conner
- Denby
- Mt. Olivet

=== Cluster 3 ===
- Butzel
- Chandler Park
- East Riverside
- Finney
- Foch
- Indian Village
- Jefferson / Mack
- Kettering
- St. Jean

=== Cluster 4 ===
- Central Business District
- Corktown
- Jeffries
- Lower East Central
- Lower Woodward
- Middle East Central
- Middle Woodward
- Near East Riverfront
- Upper East Central

=== Cluster 5 ===
- Boynton
- Chadsey
- Condon
- Hubbard Richard
- Springwells
- Vernor / Junction
- West Riverfront

=== Cluster 6 ===
- Durfee
- Rosa Parks
- Tireman
- Winterhalter

=== Cluster 7 ===
- Brooks
- Cody
- Mackenzie
- Rouge

=== Cluster 8 ===
- Brightmoor
- Evergreen
- Redford
- Rosedale

=== Cluster 9 ===
- Cerveny / Grandmont
- Greenfield
- Harmony Village

=== Cluster 10 ===
- Bagley
- McNichols
- Palmer Park
- Pembroke

== See also ==
- Neighborhoods in Detroit
