= Frank Cody High School =

High school in Detroit, Wayne County, Michigan

Location
- 18445 Cathedral Street; Detroit, Michigan; United States
- Coordinates: 42°21′38″N 83°13′17″W

Information
- School type: Public
- Opened: 1952
- School district: Detroit Public Schools
- Principal: Jason Solomon
- Teaching staff: 32.20 (FTE)
- Grades: 9-12
- Enrollment: 520 (2023-2024)
- Student to teacher ratio: 16.15
- Colors: Green and gray
- Nickname: Comets
- Website: cody.detroitk12.org

Student assessments
- 2021–22 school year Change vs. prior year

M-STEP 11th grade proficiency rates (Science / Social Studies)
- Advanced %: ≤5 / ≤5
- Proficient %: ≤5 / ≤5
- PR. Proficient %: <3 / –
- Not Proficient %: – / –

Average test scores
- SAT Total: 705.8 (▼ −73.5)

Frank Cody High School is a high school in Detroit, Michigan, United States. Named to honor former superintendent Frank Cody of Detroit Public Schools, it opened in 1952.

== History ==
The school opened in 1952. Cody absorbed attendance area from Redford and Mackenzie High School, after both facilities closed in 2007.

As of January 2016 there are three separate high school programs sharing space at Cody. During the summer of 2018 all three existing academies at the high school (Academy of Public Leadership, Medicine and Community Health, and Detroit Institute of Technology) were reunited to move forward as Cody High School for the 2018-2019 school year.

== Notable alumni ==
- Don Anderson, former NFL player.
- Raven Clay (born 1990), American hurdler
- Andrew Davison, former NFL player. Left after his Freshman season
- Nicci Gilbert (singer), actress, singer, reality show star
- Tee Grizzley, rapper and musician
- Bob Owchinko, Major Leaguer.
- Shawn Smith, NFL referee who worked Super Bowl LX

== Campus ==
The school campus has polished tile, hardwood floors, and oak cabinets. John Wisely of the Detroit Free Press wrote that these touches "hint at a time when money was abundant."

The school still maintains many of the original wood cabinets and fixtures.
