= Commandant's Quarters (Dearborn, Michigan) =

Historic house in Michigan, United States

- Commandant's Quarters, Dearborn Arsenal
- U.S. National Register of Historic Places
- Michigan State Historic Site
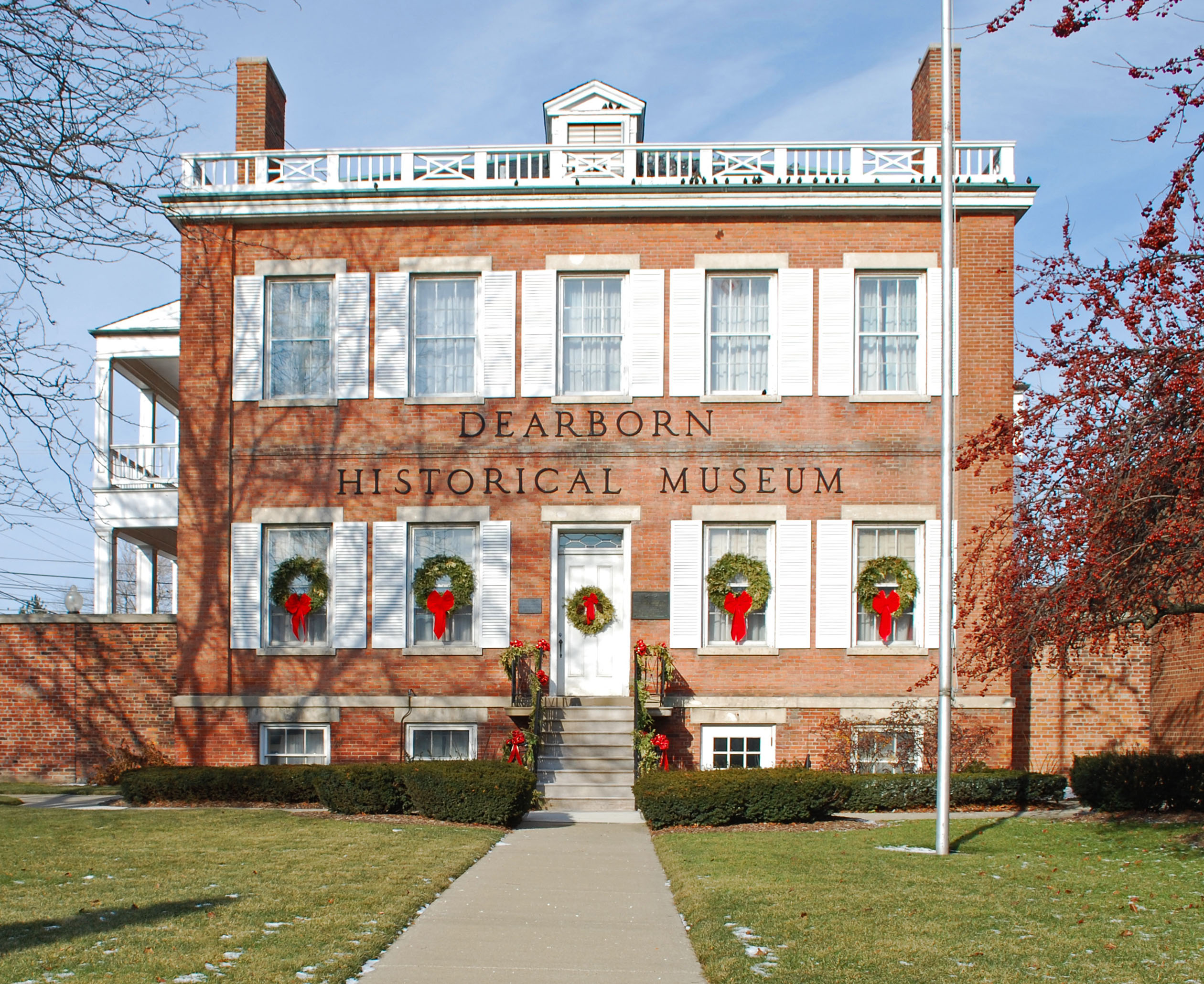

- Location within Michigan Location within the United States
- Interactive map
- Location: 21950 Michigan Ave., Dearborn, Michigan
- Coordinates: 42°18′23″N 83°14′38″W
- Area: 0.4 acres (0.16 ha)
- Built: 1833
- Architect: Jeremiah Moors
- Architectural style: Federal
- NRHP reference No.: 70000286

Significant dates
- Added to NRHP: October 15, 1970
- Designated MSHS: August 23, 1956

The Commandant's Quarters at the Dearborn Arsenal is a United States military structure located at 21950 Michigan Avenue in Dearborn, Michigan. Built in 1834, it is the oldest building in Dearborn still located on its original site. It is considered to be one of the seven most significant buildings in Michigan. It was designated as a Michigan State Historic Site in 1956 and listed on the National Register of Historic Places in 1970.

The building is part of the Dearborn Historical Museum, which also includes the 1832 Richard Gardner House and the McFadden-Ross House (originally the 1839 Arsenal powder magazine).

== History ==
In the early 19th century, the Detroit Arsenal was located in the city of Detroit. The arsenal's main purpose was to serve as a supply depot for the United States army; storing, maintaining, and repairing arms and ammunition. However, by the 1830s, the population of the city had grown such that there was fear of the stored explosives endangering the city's population. The US Congress authorized the construction of a new arsenal west of Detroit in the village of Dearbornville.

=== Construction ===
In July 1832, a site for the new Arsenal was selected located near the Rouge River on the strategically important "Chicago Road" (now Michigan Avenue) that linked Detroit to Chicago. Approximately 1,600 acres (650 ha) was set aside for a "military reservation." In July 1833, work was begun on eleven buildings comprising what was at the time called the "Detroit Arsenal at Dearbornville", The construction of the brick arsenal lasted from 1833 to 1837. The first commandant of the arsenal, Colonel Joshua Howard, proposed naming the surrounding area after Major General Henry Dearborn, a New Hampshire physician and hero of the war of Independence. Bricks for the arsenal were made locally in Dearbornville as it had rich clay deposits and a burgeoning brick industry. Sawn lumber was prepared in Detroit and barged up the Rouge River to a specially constructed dock, and slate for the roofs was imported from New York. The Dearbornville Arsenal had the first slate roofs in Michigan.

The eleven buildings of the Arsenal were spaced around a walled square, 360 feet (110 m) on a side; the ten-foot-high masonry wall was thirty inches thick and completely enclosed the square.

These eleven buildings were the following:

1. Armory, which was the largest of the buildings and used as both a storehouse and social center.
2. Sutler's Shop, where tobacco and personal articles were sold to the soldiers.
3. Guard House
4. Enlisted Men's Barracks
5. Surgeon's Quarters
6. Carpenter Shop, which around 1865 was converted into a chapel.
7. Smith's Shop
8. Saddler's Shop, where equipment for horses was made and repaired.
9. Gun Carriage Shed
10. Arsenal Office
11. Commandant's Quarters

The powder magazine was located outside the walled square, approximately 300 yards to the east.

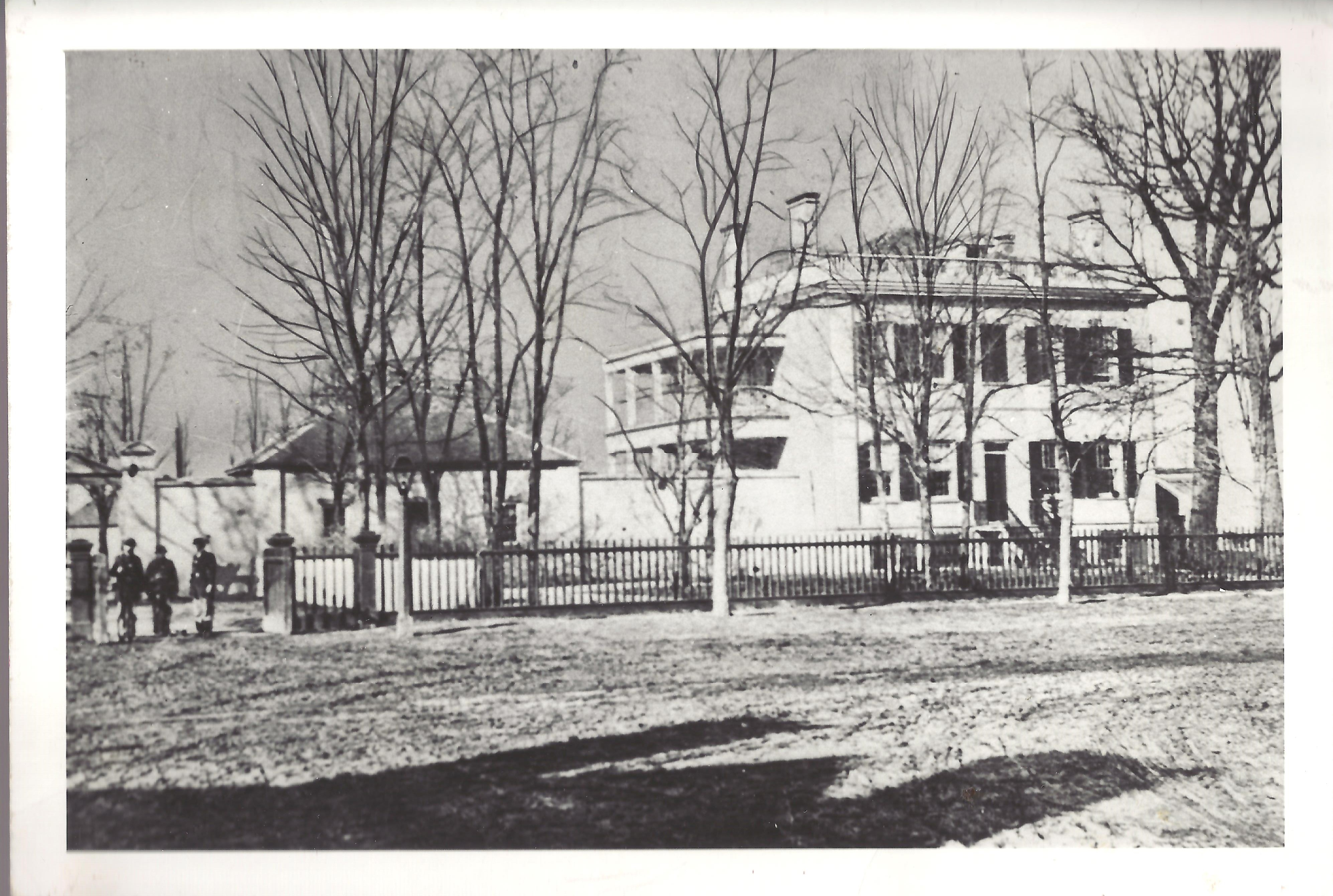
Dearbornville Arsenal Commandants Quarters, Office and main gate. Ca. 1864.

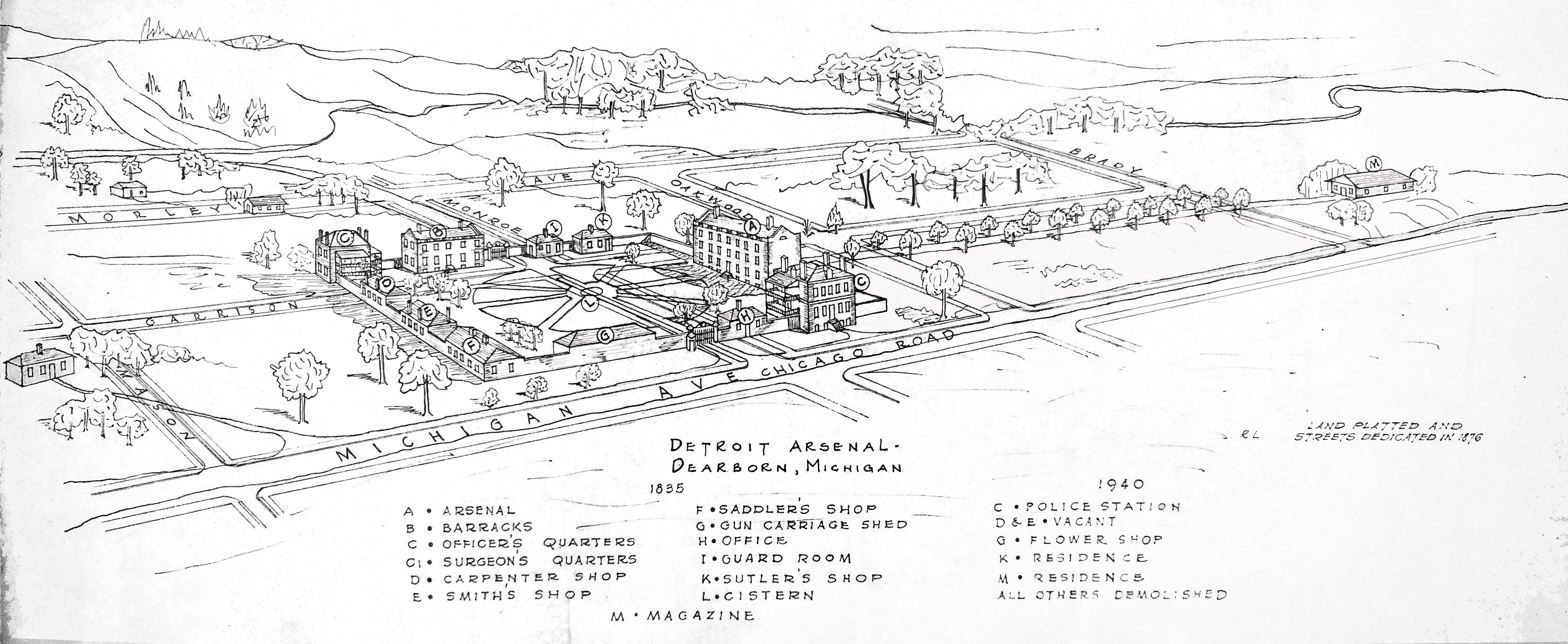

=== After 1877 ===
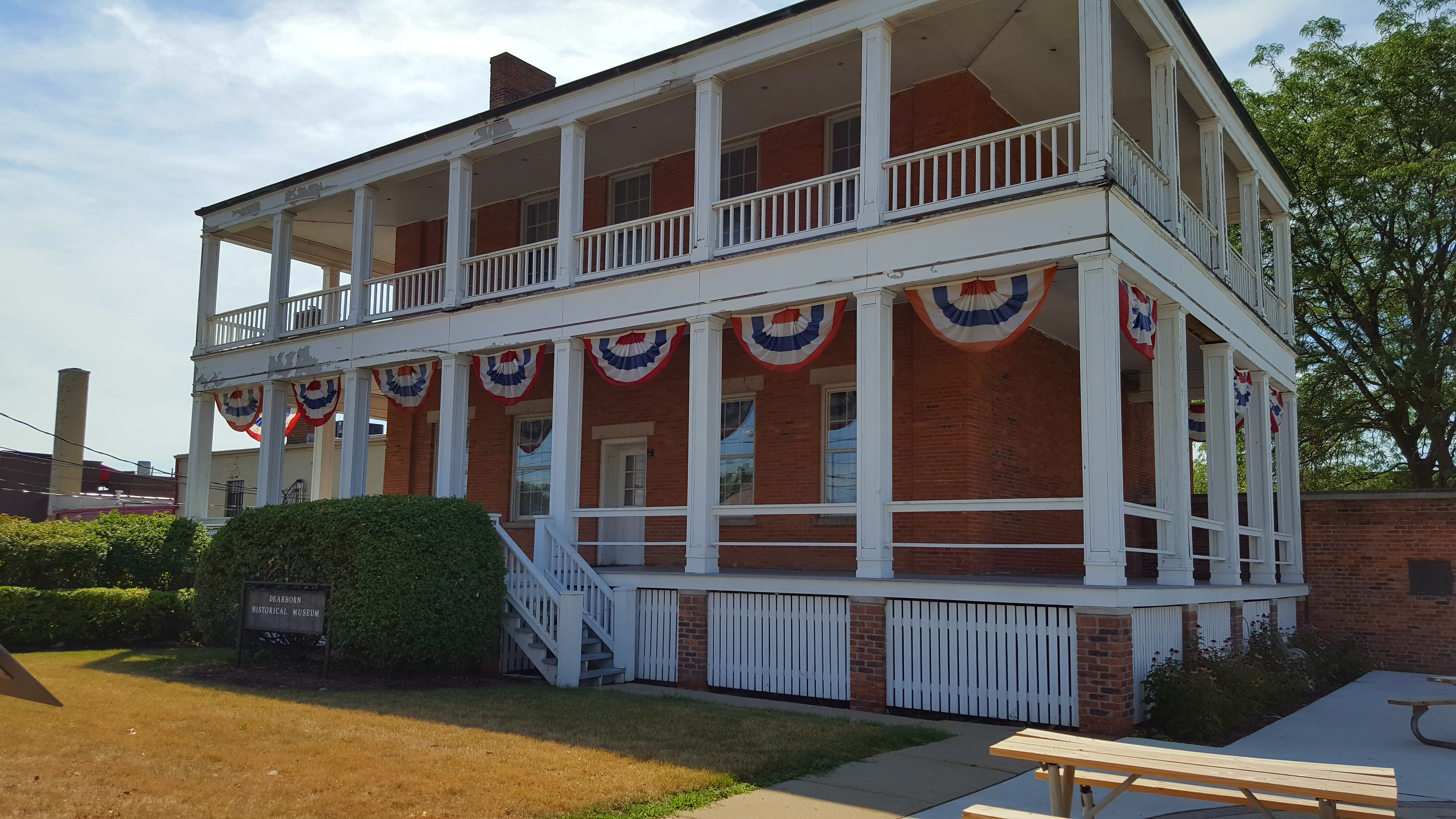
Rear of Commandant's Quarters

The arsenal was eventually judged to be no longer useful, and in 1877 the US government auctioned off the buildings. The only building remaining of the original eleven that is still in its original location and form is the commandant's quarters.

After 1877, the armory was adapted as a civic center named the "Liberty Hall," hosting events such as dancing, lodge meetings, and roller skating. In 1899, the armory was converted into a woolen mill; in 1910 the mill was destroyed in a fire. The bricks from the building were used to build new houses, some of which still stand in the area.

The guard house, enlisted men's barracks, and the surgeon's quarters were used as residences. In 1893, all three were demolished to build a school. The sutler's shop was remodeled and used for, among other things, a doctor's office. The carpenter shop and the smith's shop were combined into one two-story, three-unit building. The structure was used as a lumber mill and later by the Detroit-Dearborn Motor Car Company and by a paint shop.

The saddler's shop was used as a residence, and in the 1920s was converted into the Dearborn Town Hall. It was used for meetings until 1928. It was sold to S. S. Kresge and removed from the property. The structure was destroyed in 1946.

The gun carriage shed was converted into a two-story structure in 1906 for use by the Masonic Temple. It was later used by Pride Cleaners; it is currently home to a European Bakery. The arsenal office was used as a residence, and later as a commercial store. It was demolished in the early 20th century. The powder magazine was converted into a private residence in 1883 by Nathaniel Ross. The structure was donated to the city of Dearborn in 1950. Currently located at 915 Brady Street, it was renamed the McFadden-Ross House after it was donated to the City to be used as a museum.

The last remaining structure of the original eleven, the commandant's quarters, served as a social and cultural center in Dearborn until 1875. The building was later used as a library, American Legion hall, a town hall, police station, school, and a newspaper office. In 1949, the commandant's quarters was purchased by the Dearborn Historical Commission for use as a museum. The building was restored in 1959, and in 1970 it was listed on the National Register of Historic Places. It currently houses the Dearborn Historical Museum.

== Description of the Commandant's Quarters ==
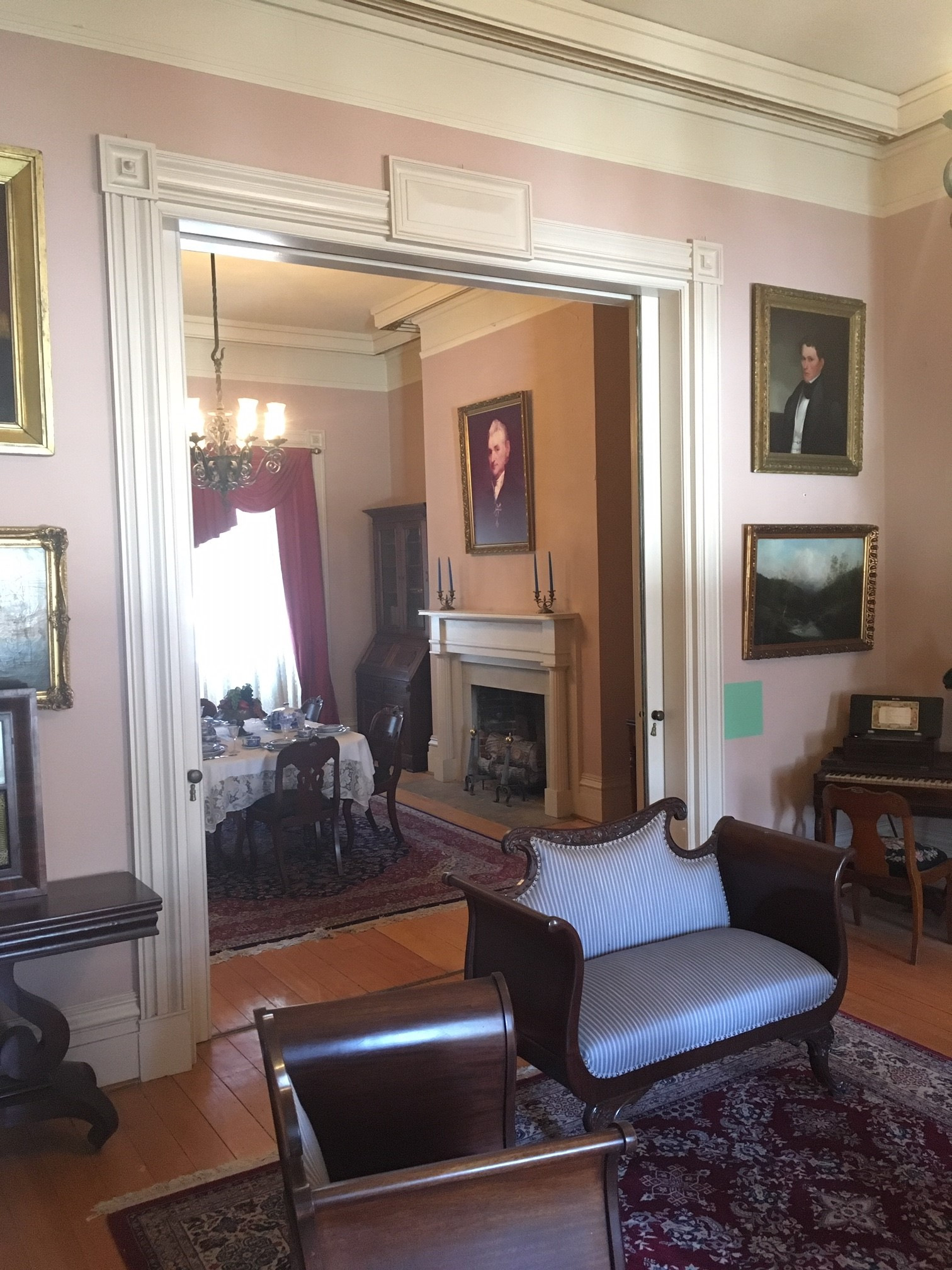
A view of the Commandants Quarters Parlor C. 2020

The Commandant's Quarters is a two-story, square, red-brick building on a raised piano nobile. The exterior of the building is classically Federal in design, while the interior was designed in the then fashionable Greek Revival style. Originally the red brick was whitewashed in the entire Arsenal. The low pitched hipped roof is covered with slate, and has gabled dormers and a balustrade. A two-story verandah with square columns extends around the rear and sides of the building, which was recreated in the 1970s to the original design. The wrought iron railing near the front entrance is handmade and original to the building. The building was surveyed by the HABS surveys in the 1930s and drawings are in the National Archives.

The interior is a typical center hall plan with a hall and staircase running front to back, with two rooms on each side. There are four bedrooms upstairs off the center hall, and a large walk up attic which was finished as a servants quarters. Kitchens were in the basement, and the home has 10 fireplaces.

Much of the interior of the Commandant's Quarters has been restored to resemble the original makeup of the building. The wall and sliding doors between the Parlor and dining room on the first floor has been replaced, and the second floor partitions, removed in the 1930s, have also been re-installed. The building is currently undergoing restoration to repair plaster and repaint rooms to historic colors. Period 1840s rooms are set up in the formal Parlor and Dining room, while other rooms are being transitioned into a chronological history museum about the city of Dearborn.
