= Detroit-Dearborn =

Defunct American motor vehicle manufacturer

The Detroit-Dearborn Motor Car Company was an American automobile manufacturer in Dearborn, Michigan from 1909 to 1910.

The company's first car was completed in January 1910. It produced two models: the Minerva, a touring torpedo, and the Nike, a roadster. After producing only 110 cars, the company went bankrupt later in 1910 as it had only $50,000 in capital.

== Specifications ==
- 112 in (280 cm) wheelbase, 36 in × 3 1/2 in (914 mm × 89 mm) tires, hickory wheels
- $1650 F.O.B. Dearborn, Michigan
- 35 hp (26 kW), four-cylinder engine; bore 4 1/8 inches, stroke 4 3/4 inches (253.92 cubic inches)
- 3-speed transmission; 3 forward speeds plus reverse
- 20-gallon gas tank capacity
- Body, hood and frame painted in Holland Blue with cream striping; springs and wheels painted cream with blue striping
- 5/8 in (16 mm) wood body panels
- Aluminum doors
- Solid oak floor and running boards

== Officers of the company ==
- Edward Bland, President
- Arthur E. Kiefer, Vice-President
- Samuel D. Lapham, Treasurer
- Elmer W. Foster, Secretary
- Paul Arthur, Superintendent and Engineer
