= Parklane Towers =

Skyscrapers in Dearborn, Michigan

Coordinates: 42.32422°N 83.20948°W

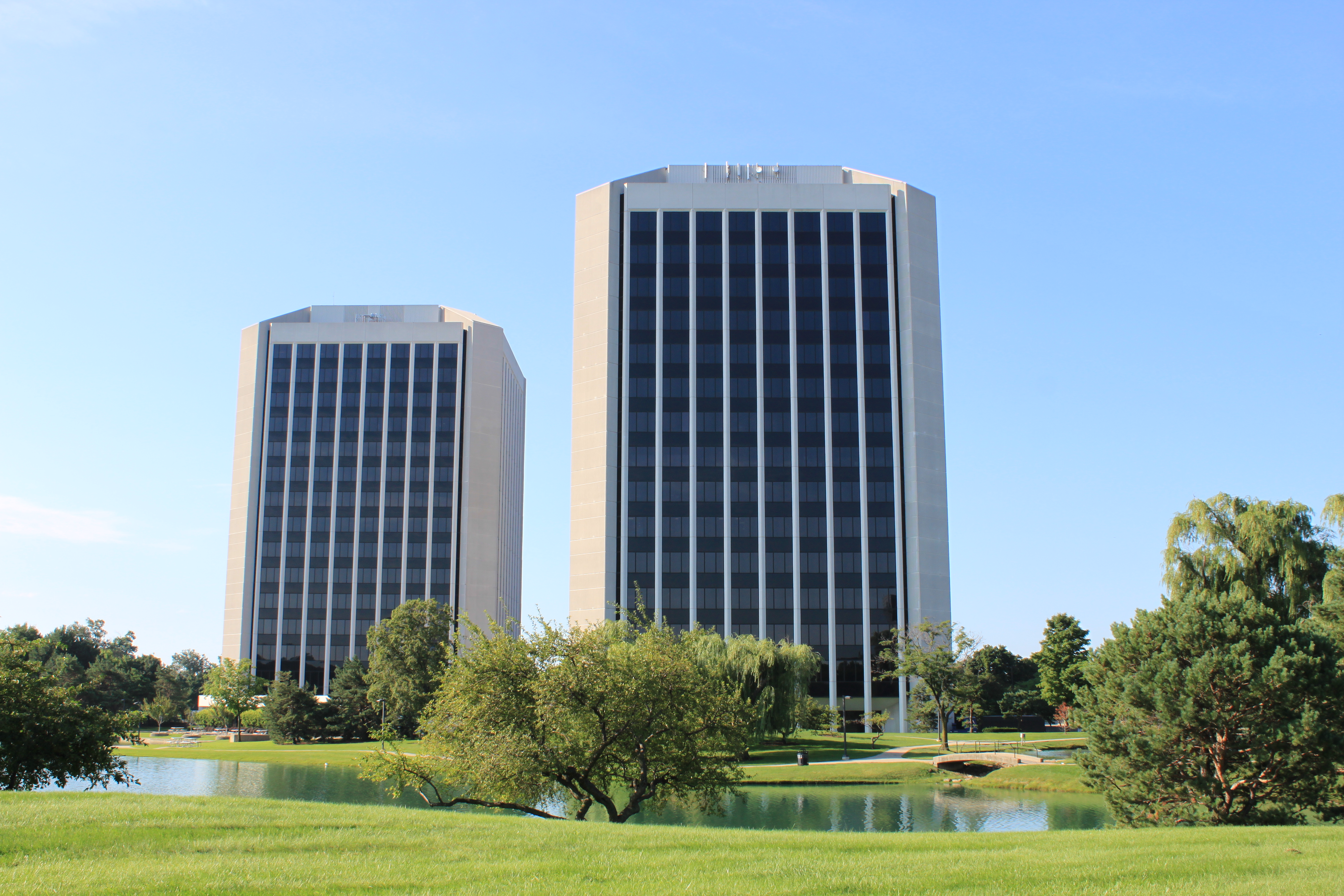
Parklane Towers

The Parklane Towers complex is a pair of twin office buildings in Dearborn, Michigan, United States, known locally as the "salt and pepper shakers" or "washer and dryer".

Parklane Towers East is located at 1 Parklane Boulevard in Dearborn, Michigan. It was constructed in 1971 and stands at 15 stories. The older of the twin buildings is used for offices, retail, and other commercial space.

Parklane Towers West is located at 3 Parklane Boulevard in Dearborn, MI. The younger of the two buildings was constructed in 1973 and stands at 15 floors in height. Designed by Rossetti architects, the high-rise is used for offices and retail space. Rossetti architects designed both towers in the modern architectural style with concrete and glass as its main materials. Joseph Pasquali was the tile setter and mechanic for the towers.
