= Dearborn City Hall Complex =

- U.S. National Register of Historic Places
- U.S. Historic district
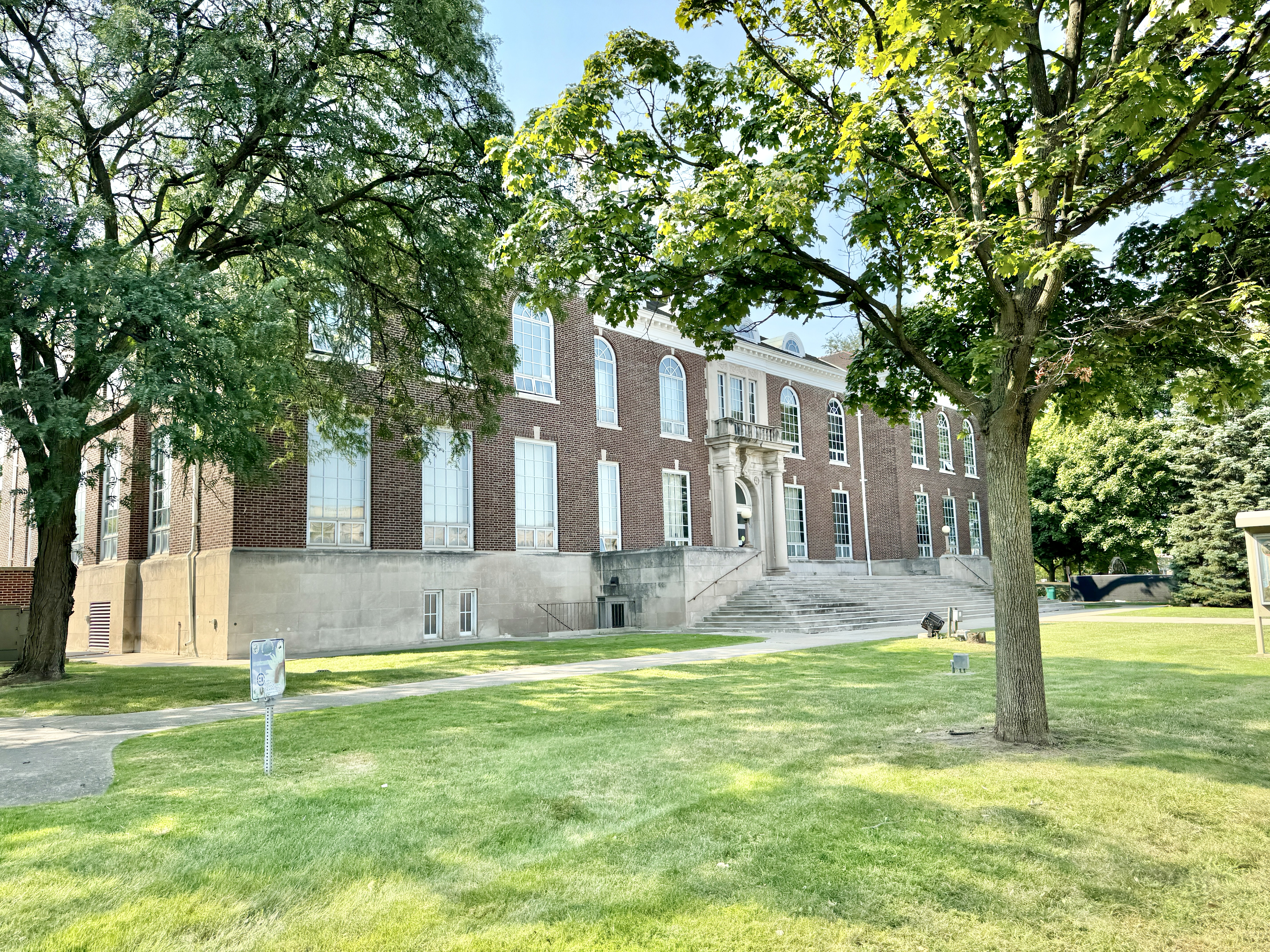
- Interactive map
- Location: 13615 Michigan Ave; Dearborn, Michigan
- Coordinates: 42°19′17″N 83°10′36″W
- Built: 1921, 1929
- Architect: Marcus Burrowes, Fry and Kasurin
- Architectural style: Colonial Revival, Georgian Revival
- NRHP reference No.: 14000513
- Added to NRHP: August 25, 2014

The Dearborn City Hall Complex is a complex of three government buildings located at 13615 Michigan Avenue in Dearborn, Michigan. The complex includes the 1921 Dearborn City Hall (originally the Springwells Municipal Building), the 1929 Police and Municipal Courts Building, and an office/auditorium concourse addition constructed in 1981. The complex was listed on the National Register of Historic Places in 2014.

== History ==
The settlement of Springwells, located around what is now the Dearborn City Hall, was first established along the Michigan Central Railroad line in 1837. Although Springwells was assigned a post office, it was not incorporated as a separate political jurisdiction until 1921, when the Village of Springwells was incorporated. That year the village commissioned architect Marcus Burrowes to construct the Springwells Municipal Building, Construction cost just over $200,000 (equivalent to $2.78 million in 2024). Burrowes envisioned the Municipal Building as the first of a complex of connected structures. Although his plan was never completely realized, additional structures were built in the 1920s to make a municipal complex.

With the tax base from the Ford River Rouge Complex and associated workers, Springwells rapidly grew into one of Detroit's largest and most prosperous suburbs, and the government complex grew along with it. A few years later the village was incorporated as a city, and in 1925 Springwells changed its name to Fordson. Also in 1925, the Fire Hall and Garage was constructed adjacent to the Municipal Building; the Fire Alarm Building was also constructed around the same time. In 1929, the City of Fordson consolidated with the nearby Village of Dearborn and Dearborn Township to form the City of Dearborn. In the same year, a Signal Bureau Building was added, along with the Police and Municipal Courts Building.

The Dearborn City Hall was the seat of power in Dearborn. The first mayor of the consolidated Dearborn was Henry Ford's cousin Clyde M. Ford, who served from 1929 to 1935. Orville L. Hubbard was mayor from 1942 to 1978. In 1979, three of the smaller buildings in the complex—the Fire Hall and Garage, the Fire Alarm Building, and the Signal Bureau Building—were demolished make room for the 1981 concourse addition.

== Description ==
The Dearborn City Hall Complex occupies a nearly an entire block along Michigan Avenue near downtown Dearborn. The complex consists of three buildings: the 1921 Dearborn City Hall which faces north on Michigan Avenue, the 1929 Police and Municipal Courts Building which faces west on Maple Street, and the 1981 office, auditorium, and parking structure addition to the southeast, which connects the two other buildings. The site also includes a landscaped public park, a small paved war memorial plaza, and a small surface parking lot.

=== Dearborn City Hall ===
The Dearborn City Hall is a 2 1/2-story symmetric red brick Georgian Revival structure with a limestone base and hipped roof, designed in 1921 by Marcus Burrowes. It is approximately 300 feet (91 m) long and 125 feet (38 m) deep, with the main entrance located in the center of the main facade. The main elevation is five bays wide, with projecting three-bay wide wings at each end of the building. The windows are irregularly spaced, with double-hung, four-over-four units installed in the basement, divided light units with square heads on the first floor, and round arch divided light units on the second-floor. The roof is covered with clay tile, and a dominant Colonial cupola is located in the center of the building.

The interior of the building has a central corridor with terrazzo and marble floors on all four levels. The corridors have a marble wainscot, and each floor is connected with a grand curving marble staircase. Most of the interior space consists of offices and storage rooms, with plastered walls and ceilings. Most of these spaces were remodeled in 1981.

=== Police and Municipal Courts Building ===
The Police and Municipal Courts Building is a symmetrical U-shaped red brick 2 1/2-story Colonial Revival structure, designed in 1929 by architect John Kasurin of the firm Fry and Kasurin. The building measures approximately 250 feet (76 m) long by 125 feet (38 m) deep. The main facade has a central projecting three-bay limestone entrance section clad in limestone, flanked by five-bay wide portions at each end of the building. The center entrance contains a tall double-door entryway with a large glass light and limestone pediment lintel, with a pair of double-hung windows flanking the entry doors. Four Tuscan limestone pilasters support a projecting limestone entablature above the entry. The windows in the structure are irregularly spaced, and include double-hung three-over-three units in the basement, and square head double-hung eight-over-eight units on the first and second floors.

The interior of the building is similar to that of the City Hall, containing a central corridor with terrazzo and marble floors on all levels, with a marble wainscot on the upper floors. A grand curving marble staircase connects the floors in the central lobby. Most of the interior space consists of offices and storage rooms, with plastered walls and ceilings. Most of these spaces were remodeled in 1981.

=== Concourse Addition ===
The Concourse Addition does not contribute to the historic district. The addition is a partially underground cast-in-place concrete structure designed by Rosetti Associates in 1981 to provide a basement-level connection between the other two buildings.

== See also ==
- National Register of Historic Places listings in Wayne County, Michigan
