= Henry Ford Centennial Library =

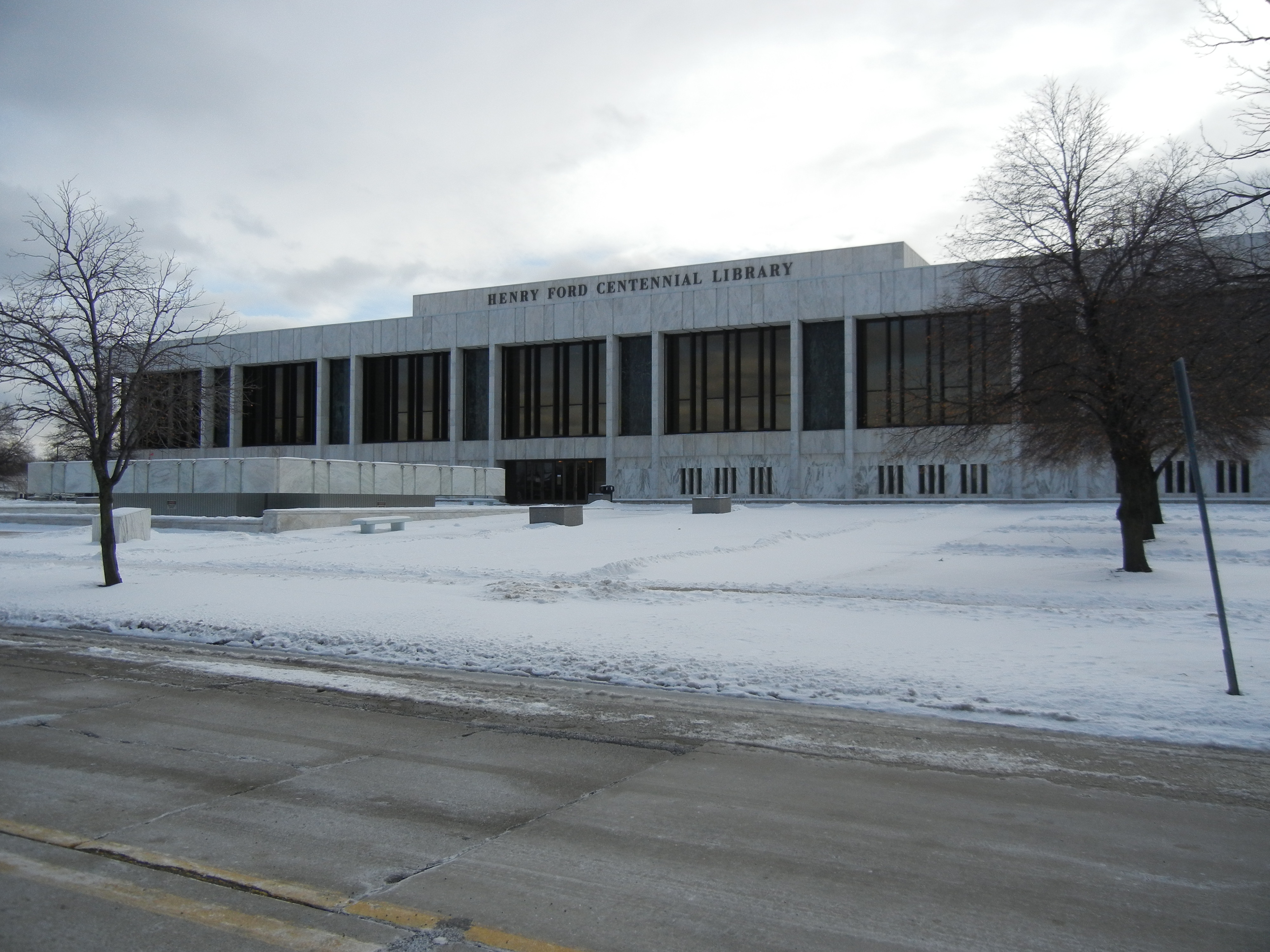
- Henry Ford Centennial Library
- 42.31317°N 83.20262°W
- Location: Dearborn, Michigan, United States
- Type: Public library
- Established: 1969
- Branches: 2 branches, 1 main building

Access and use
- Population served: 96,000

Other information
- Website: dearbornlibrary.org

The Henry Ford Centennial Library is the main branch of the Dearborn Public Libraries in Dearborn, Michigan in Metro Detroit. It is located at 16301 Michigan Avenue.

== History ==
In 1963, to commemorate the centennial anniversary of the birth of Henry Ford, the Ford Foundation donated three million dollars to the City of Dearborn to construct a memorial library. On July 30, 1963, Ford's hundredth birthday, the Ford Motor Company deeded 15.3 acres (6.2 ha) of land to the City of Dearborn for the building. The library was formally dedicated November 25, 1969.

Henry Ford Centennial Library's original floorplan designs included large meeting rooms along the first floor; a sizable Children's section, detailed public card catalogue, an adult reading room (now a conference room where the Ford Collection of books is currently kept), open periodical stacks for active issues of magazines and closed periodical stacks where back issues could be kept, record listening booths, adult fiction and nonfiction sections, and typewriters spread along the second floor; and a closed book stack and the Audio-Visual department, where 8mm and 16mm film reels and other materials were kept in staff-accessible archives, were located on the third floor, where the Mezzanine and study rooms are located now.

In March 2016, the city demolished the fountain which was a major component of the plaza outside the main entry since the building's construction. The fountain had not functioned in several years and city officials said it was too costly to repair and maintain. In its place, the city re-constructed the plaza to include monuments honoring veterans. The city had veterans' monuments on the grounds of the former city hall, however the city moved its offices and sold that structure in 2014. Terms of the sale required the city to remove the monuments and leaders decided that the library site was the best location.

The Library closed in May 2019 for major renovations that were expected to be completed that Autumn. Work included replacement of HVAC systems; installation of energy-efficient lighting; additional electrical outlets and charging stations; restroom renovations; reorganization of the second floor and new carpet and wallpaper. Due to unforeseen construction issues, the reopening was delayed until 2020. Initial plans were that it would be in May. However, Michigan Governor Gretchen Whitmer announced a Stay-at-home order on March 24, 2020, in response to the COVID-19 pandemic which eventually extended through May 28.

== Artwork ==
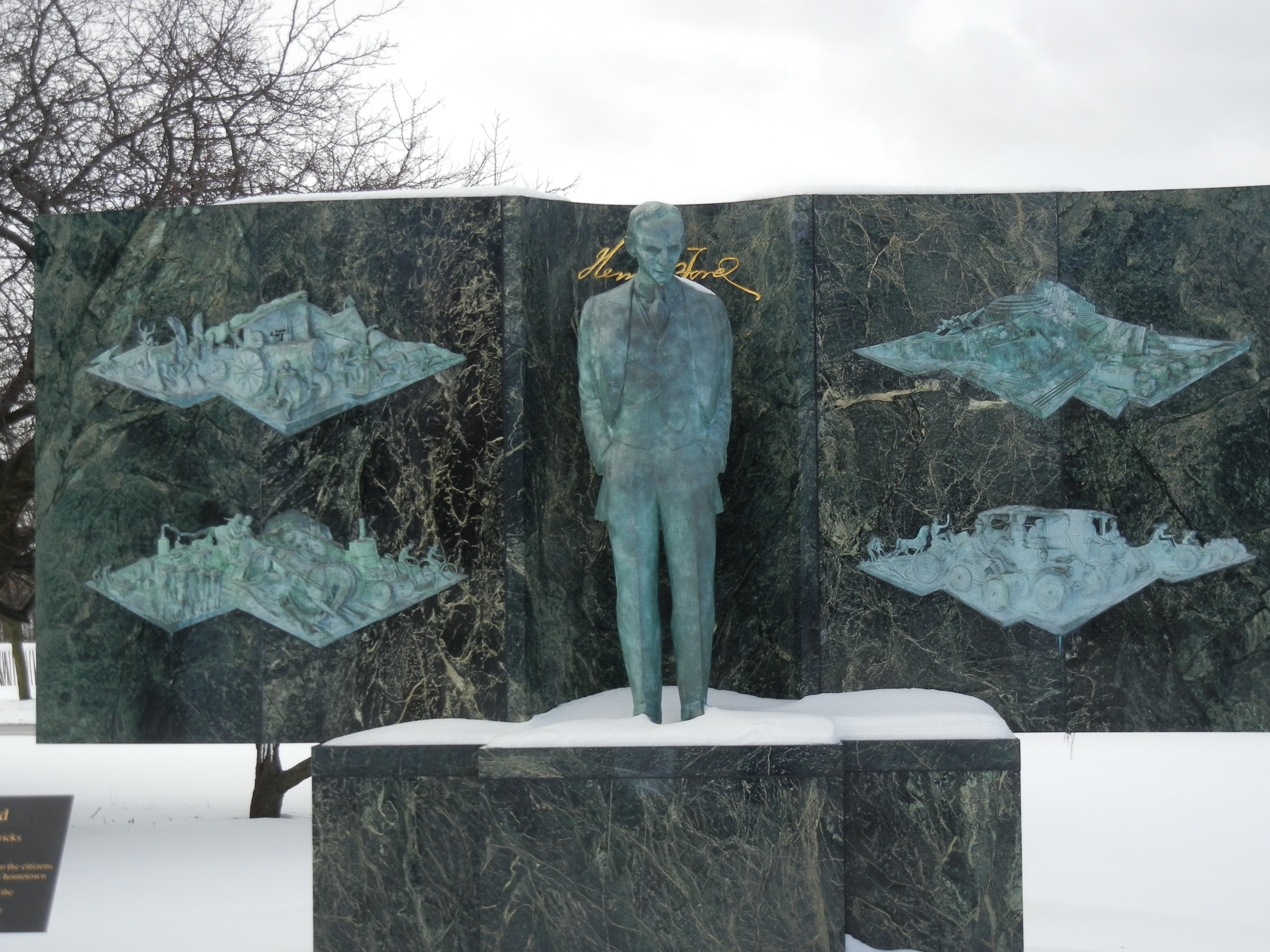
Henry Ford Memorial

In 1968, a group of residents formed "The Henry Ford Statue Committee" for to act on ideas first proposed after Ford's death in 1947, to create a memorial honoring his contributions to the city. The committee commissioned a statue of Ford from local sculptor Marshall Fredericks at a cost of $50,000. The statue was dedicated in 1975 on the library's plaza. The statue is bronze on a green marble pedestal. It depicts an elder Ford with head bowed and hands in his pockets as if caught in a moment of thought. Behind him is a green marble slab on which appear his signature, carved above the statue, and four relief scenes also in bronze. Three of the reliefs represent various modes of transportation including horse- and oxen-drawn wagons, steam-powered vehicles, bicycles and finally several early autos. The fourth depicts trucks, autos and trains emerging from a collage of buildings associated with the history of Ford Motor Company. The rear of the slab contains three quotes. Over the years, the exposure to the elements caused the memorial to deteriorate until 2007 when the Henry Ford II Fund and Friends of the Library–Dearborn contributed to restore it.

The first floor of the library houses the Rotunda Gallery, a free public art gallery, "managed cooperatively by the Dearborn Library Commission and the Dearborn Community Arts Council." Also in the Rotunda is a reflecting pool and serpentine wall created by Glen Michaels. The spiral staircase connecting all three floors surrounds a large hanging tapestry created by Michaels. Another of Michaels's artworks, a bas-relief mural of the United States that was originally part of the Ford Pavilion at the 1964 New York World's Fair, is on the library's second floor.

== Special programs ==
The library and Friends of the Library-Dearborn offer screenings of current and classic films on Monday nights. Screenings are open to the public and free of charge. The library also hosts book and game swaps for teens and story hours, craft workshops and other activities for children.
