= Ford-Wyoming Drive-In =

Drive-in theater in Dearborn, Michigan, United States

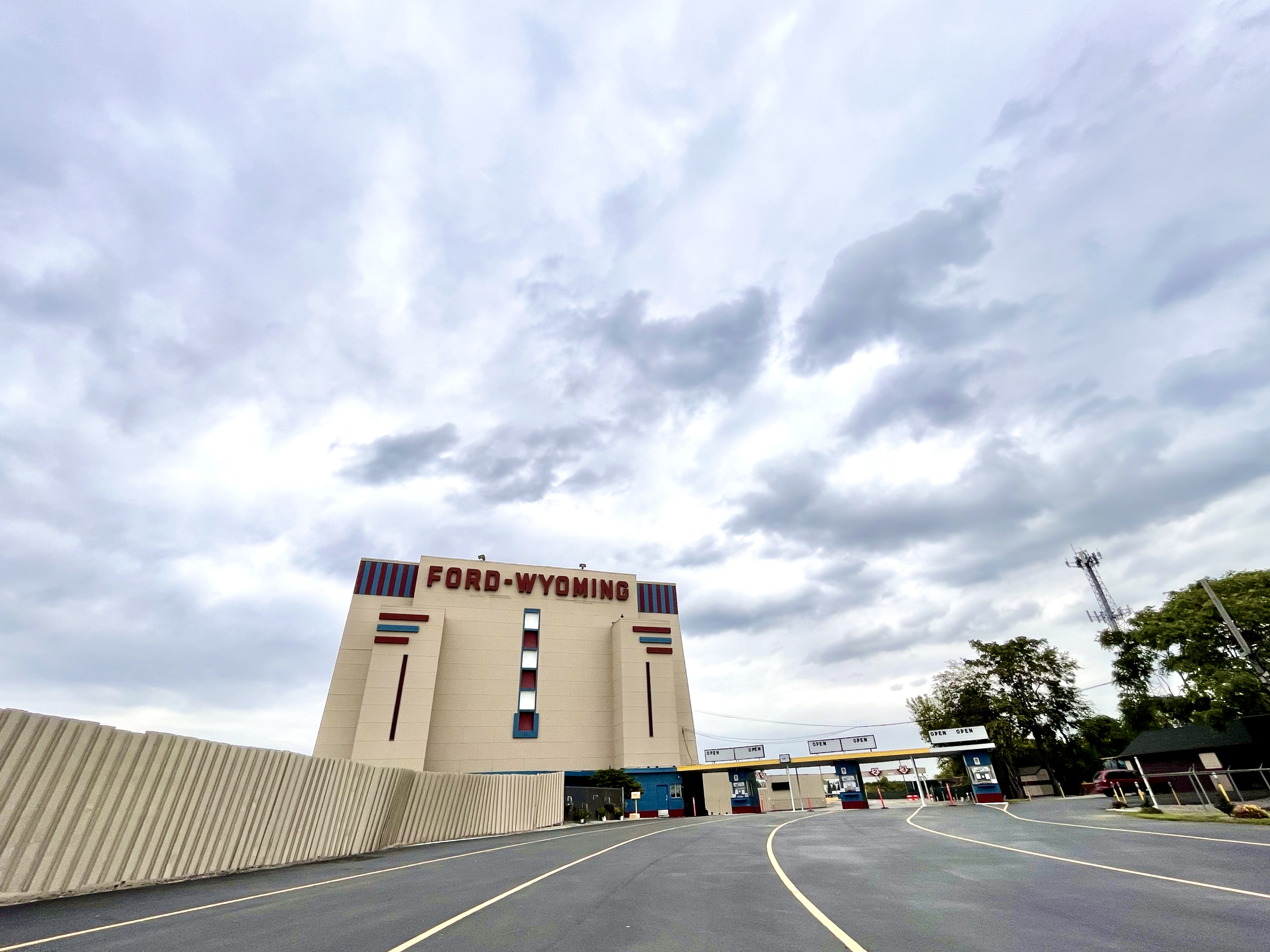
- Entrance, October 2023
- Interactive map of Ford-Wyoming Drive-In
- Address: 10400 Ford Road; Dearborn, Michigan; United States
- Coordinates: 42.3319°N 83.1603°W
- Capacity: 2500
- Type: drive-in theater
- Screen: 5

Construction
- Built: 1950
- Opened: May 19, 1950; 76 years ago
- Years active: 1950-present

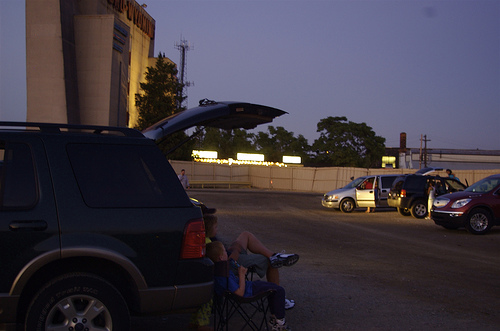
Audience in parking lot

Ford-Wyoming Drive-In is a drive-in theater located in Dearborn, Michigan, United States. Opened in 1950, it features five screens. The property previously had nine, leading it to be declared the largest drive-in theater in the world.

== History ==
Clark Enterprises built the Ford-Wyoming Drive-In in 1950. The theater opened for business on May 19 of that year, with a double-bill of The Man from Colorado and Road to Rio as its first attraction. Upon opening, the drive-in had the capacity for 750 cars.

Wayne Amusements purchased the drive-in in 1981 and expanded it by continuing to add screens. At its peak, the Ford-Wyoming had nine screens and a capacity of over 3,000 cars, leading it to become the largest drive-in theater in the world.

In 2006, the owners sold the land on which the sixth through ninth screens were located. This decision was made due to the rise of home-theater systems and a decline in population of nearby Detroit. The five screens have remained operational since this downsizing. This has reduced the overall capacity to 2,500 cars. It is one of nine remaining drive-in theaters in the state of Michigan, and the only one in Metro Detroit. As of 2019, the theater is owned by Charles Shafer.
