= Dearborn Ice Skating Center =

Indoor Ice Arena

Coordinates: 42.3304°N 83.1893°W

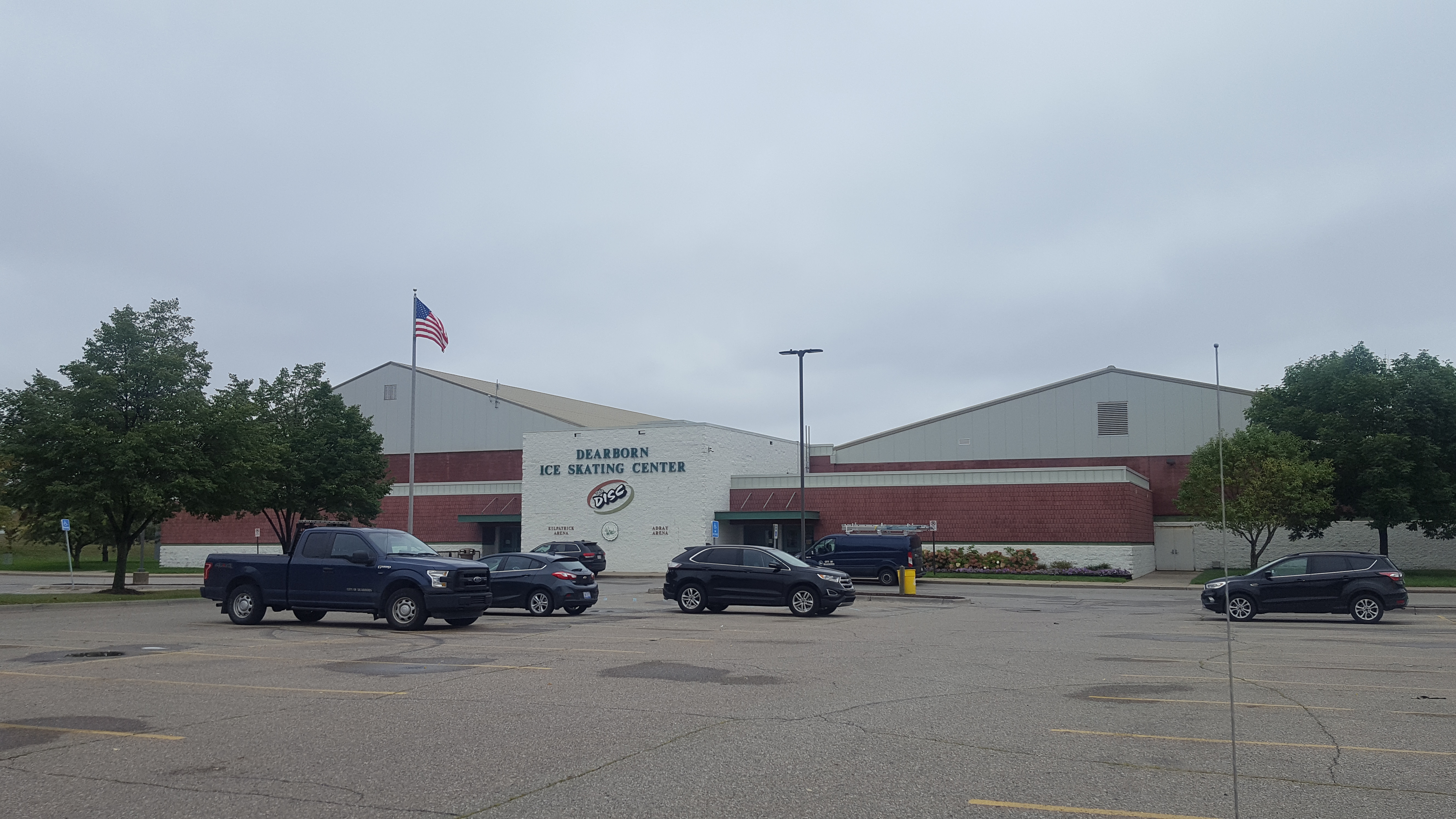

Dearborn Ice Skating Center (The DISC, formerly Mike Adray Arena) is a 1,700-seat indoor ice arena located in Dearborn, Michigan, United States, in Metro Detroit. It is used primarily for high school and youth hockey as well as for ice skating. There are 1,500 seats at the main arena and another 200 in the viewing area. The arena contains eight locker rooms and three officials' rooms. Two party rooms also overlook the arena. The arena was recently remodeled with a new 4,000-square-foot (370 m^{2}) lobby and main entrance. Built in 1971 as the Ford Woods Ice Arena, it was renamed the Mike Adray Sports Arena in 1981. A second ice rink was added in 1996 and named Kilpatrick Arena, with the entire complex being renamed the Dearborn Ice Skating Center.
