= Dearborn, Michigan =

- City
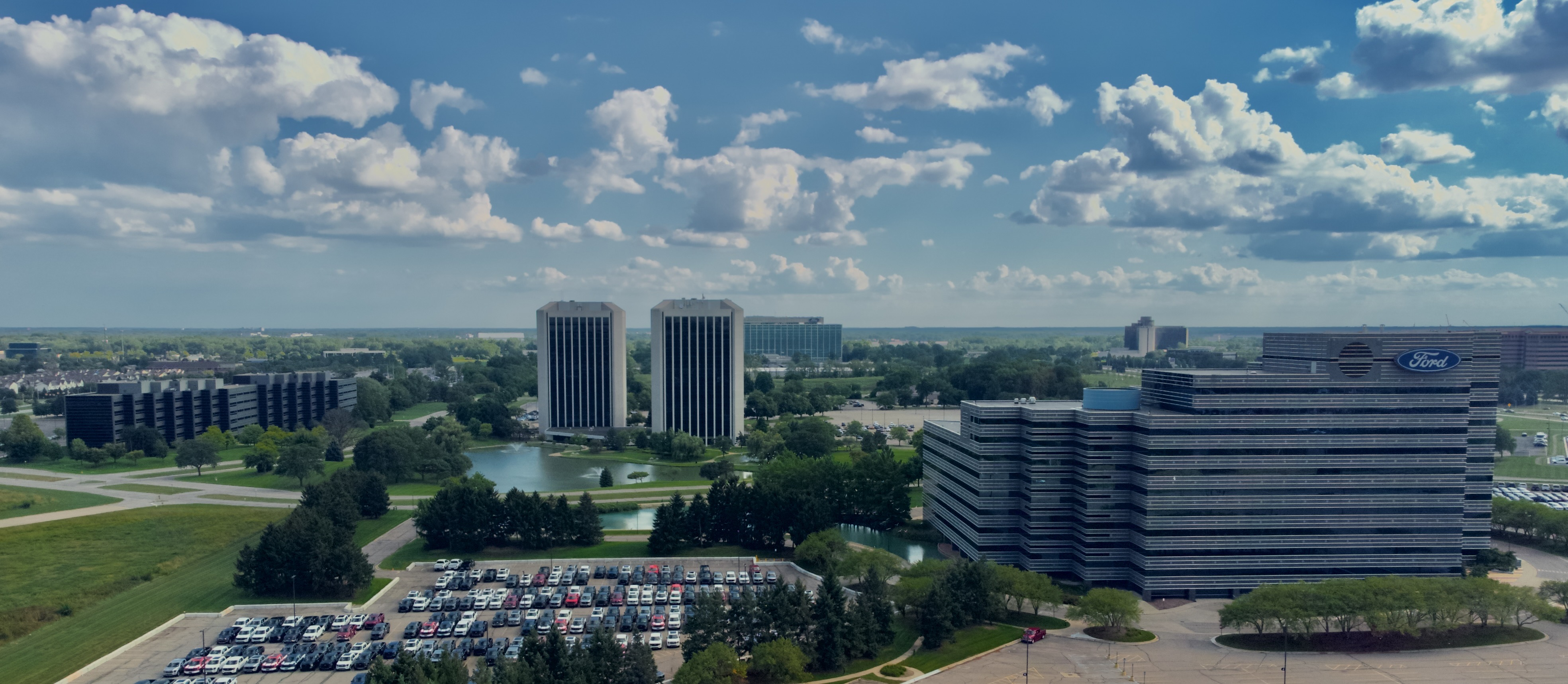
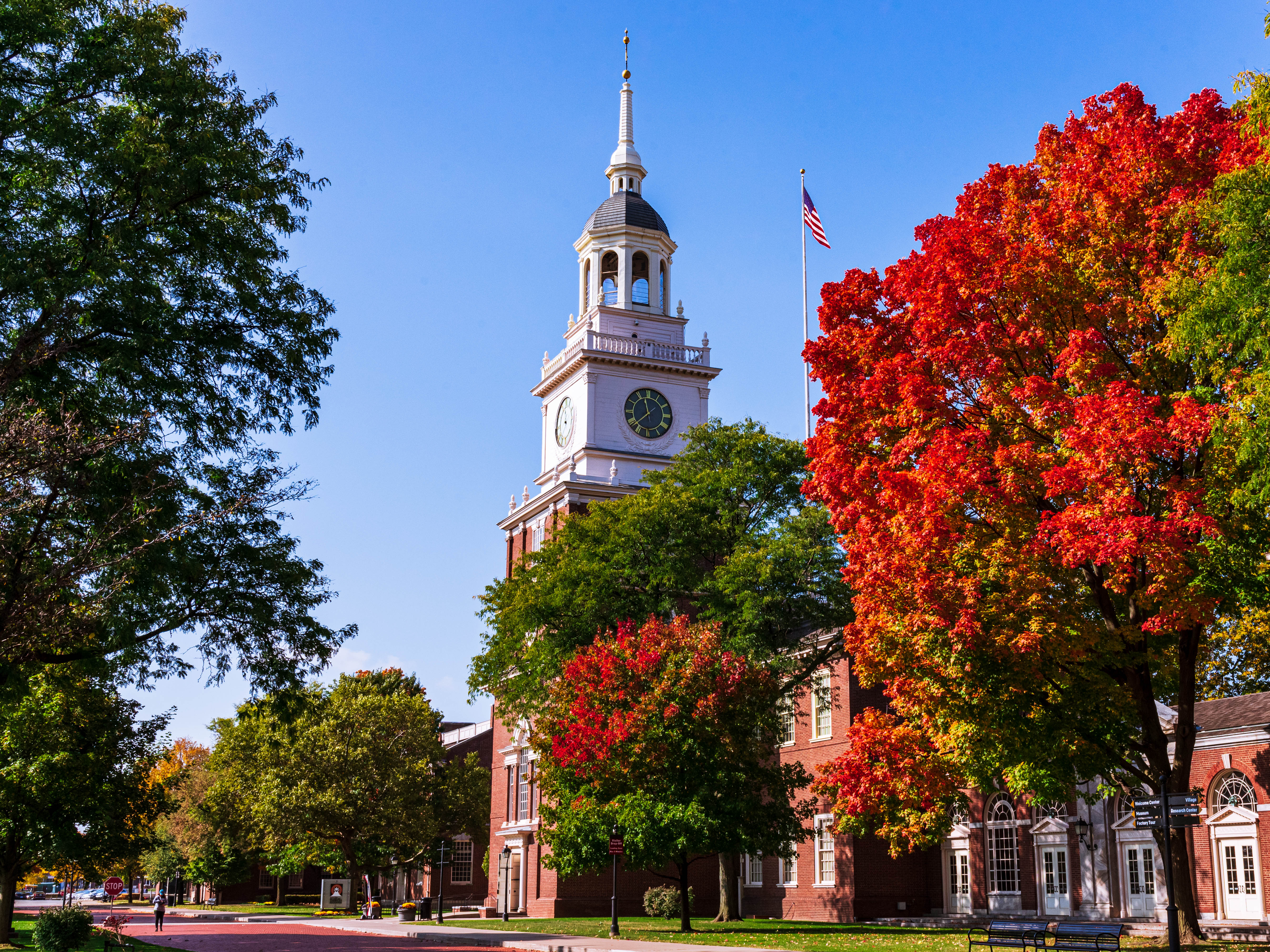
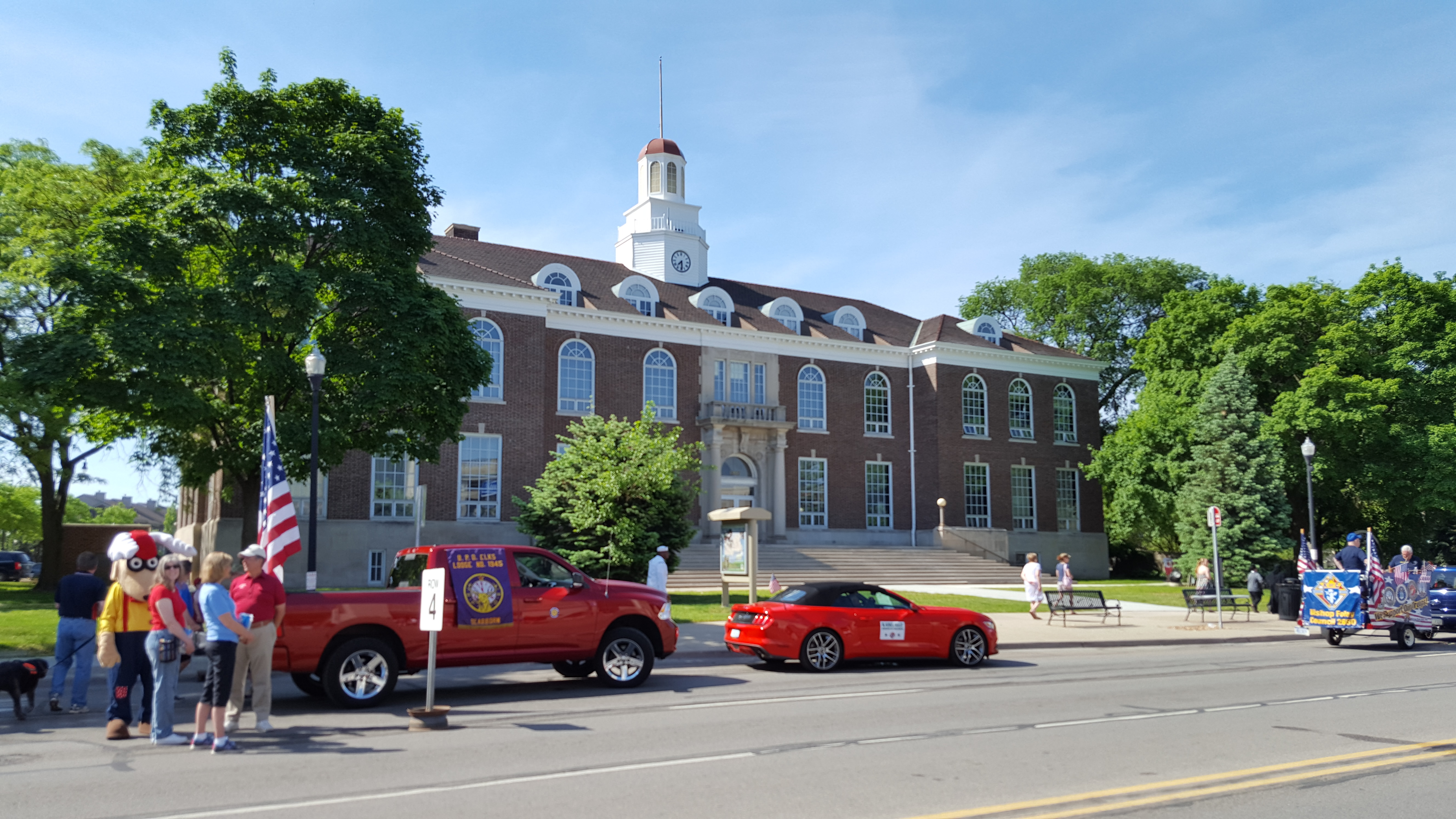
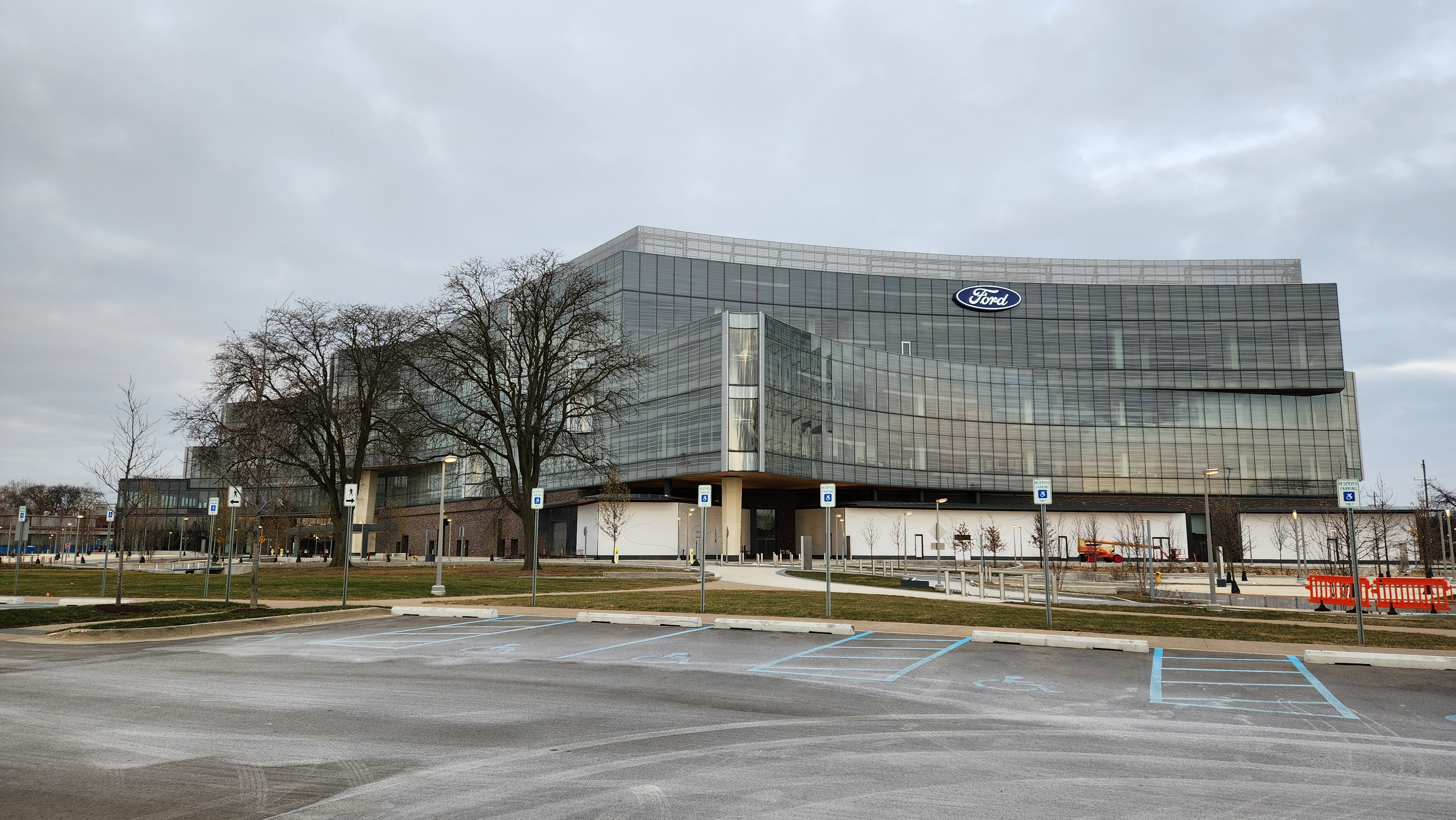
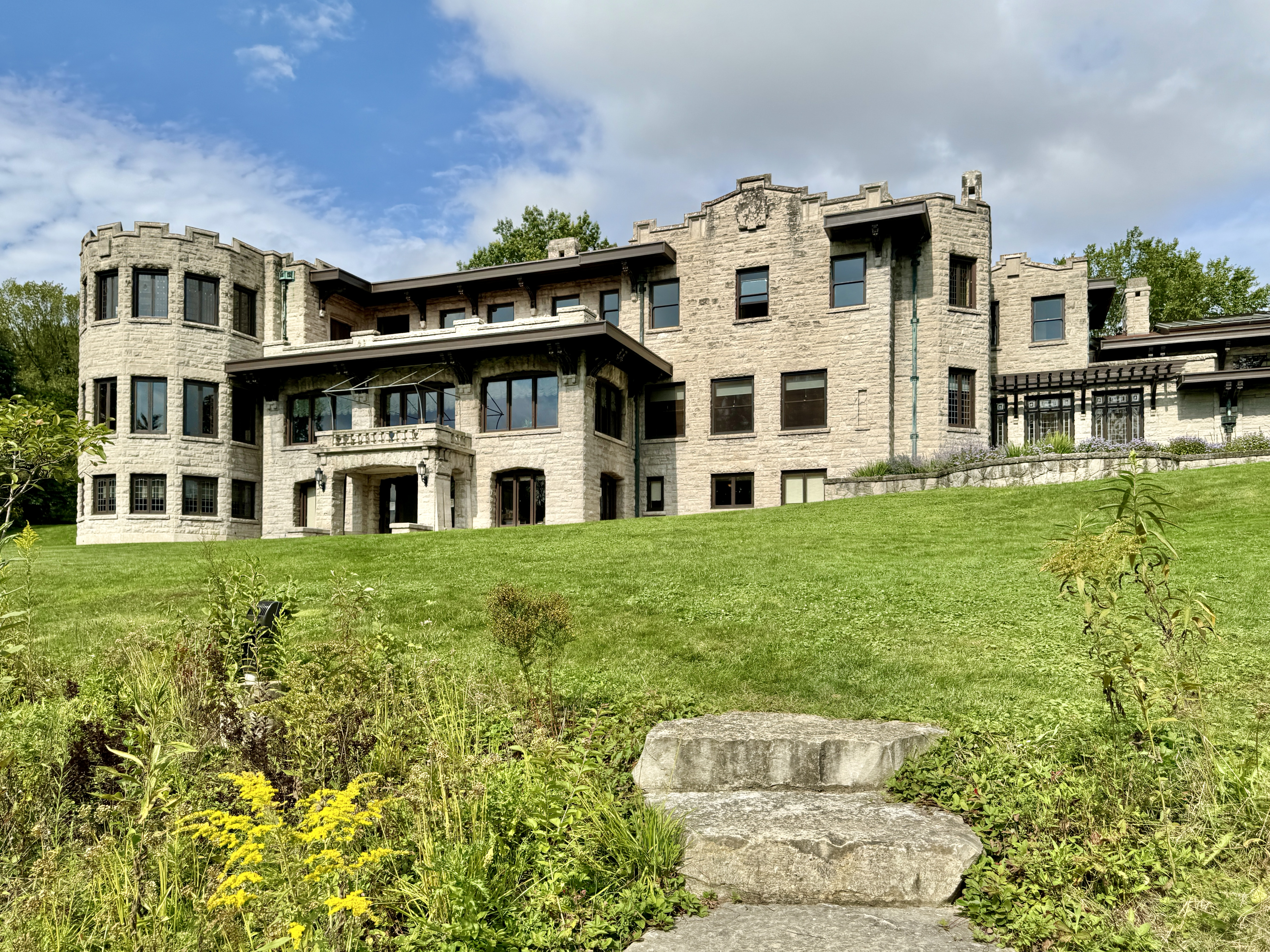
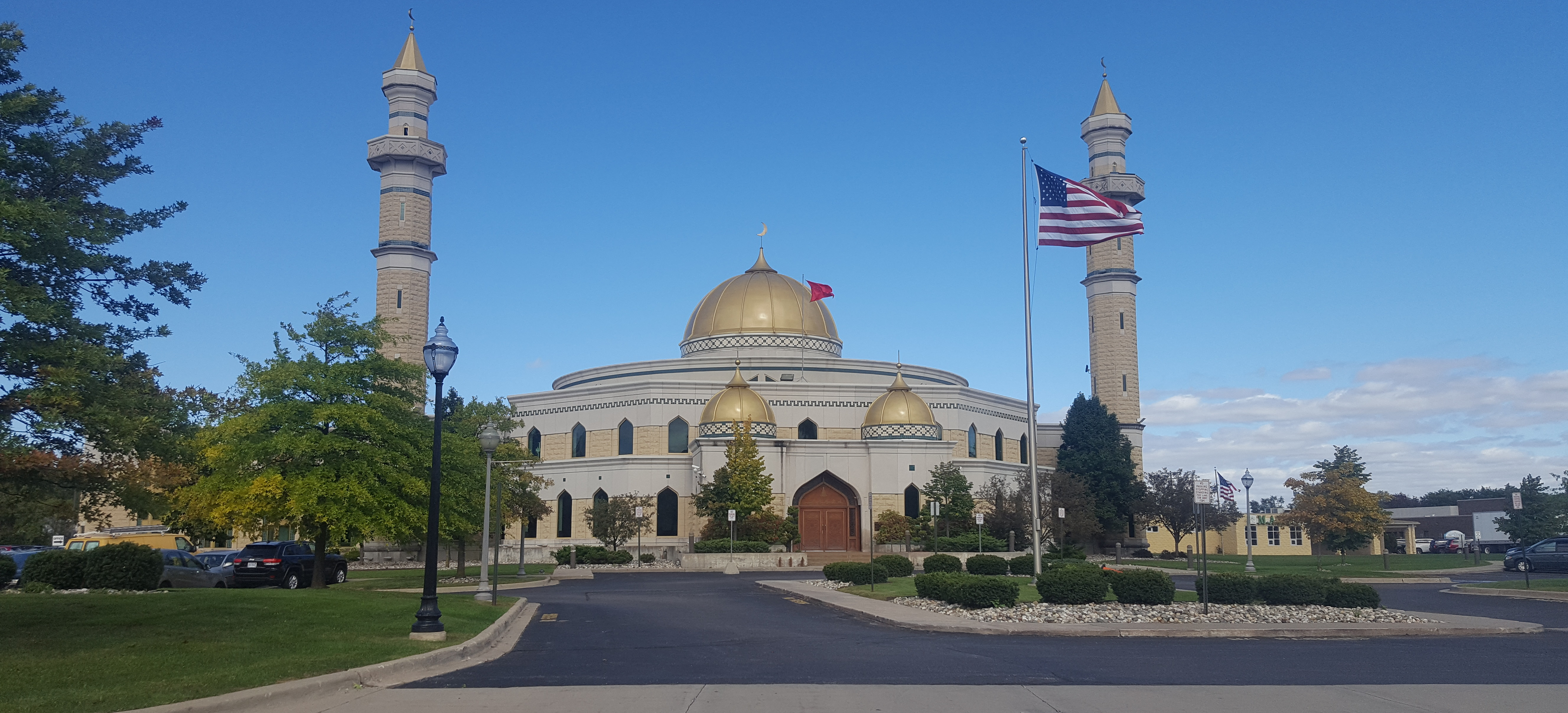
- Skyline of Dearborn with the Parklane Towers The Henry Ford Dearborn City Hall Complex Ford World Headquarters Fair Lane Islamic Center of America

- Flag Seal
- Motto: "Home Town of Henry Ford"
- Interactive map of Dearborn, Michigan
- Location within Michigan Location within the United States
- Coordinates: 42°18′52″N 83°12′48″W
- Country: United States
- State: Michigan
- County: Wayne
- Settled: 1786; 240 years ago
- Incorporated: 1893; 133 years ago (village); 1927; 99 years ago (city)
- Named for: Henry Dearborn

Government
  - Type: Mayor–council
  - Mayor: Abdullah Hammoud (D)
  - Clerk: George Darany

Area
  - City: 24.51 sq mi (63.49 km^{2})
  - Land: 24.25 sq mi (62.80 km^{2})
  - Water: 0.27 sq mi (0.69 km^{2})
- Elevation: 590 ft (180 m)

Population (2020)
  - City: 109,976
  - Density: 4,535.7/sq mi (1,751.25/km^{2})
  - Metro: 4,285,832 (Metro Detroit)
- Time zone: UTC−5 (EST)
  - Summer (DST): UTC−4 (EDT)
- ZIP code(s): 48120, 48121, 48123, 48124, 48126, 48128
- Area code: 313
- FIPS code: 26-21000
- GNIS feature ID: 0624432
- Website: dearborn.gov

Dearborn is a city in Wayne County in the U.S. state of Michigan. An inner-ring suburb of Detroit, Dearborn is bordered by Detroit to the north and east, roughly 7 miles (11.3 km) west of downtown Detroit. As of the 2020 census, it had a population of 109,976, ranking as the seventh-most populous city in Michigan. Dearborn is best known as the hometown of the Ford Motor Company and of its founder, Henry Ford.

The first written settlement of Dearborn is from the 18th century by French-Canadian voyageurs who initially called the settlement La Belle Fontaine or Place aux Fontaines because of the abundant springs in the area. Therefore, Dearborn was once named Springwells, an anglicization of the French name. The settlement was connected to the Detroit River ribbon farm communities and other farms connected to the Rouge River and the Sauk Trail. The community grew in the 19th century with the establishment of the Detroit Arsenal on the Chicago Road linking Detroit and Chicago. During the 20th century, it developed as a major manufacturing hub for the automotive industry.

Henry Ford was born on a farm that was once at the intersection of Ford Road and Greenfield Road. Ford later built his estate, Fair Lane, and his River Rouge Complex, the largest factory of his empire, in Dearborn. He developed the mass production of automobiles, and based the world headquarters of the Ford Motor Company here. The city has a campus of the University of Michigan, and Henry Ford College. The Henry Ford is the largest indoor-outdoor historic museum complex in the United States, and Metro Detroit's leading tourist attraction.

Dearborn residents are Americans primarily of European or Middle Eastern ancestry, many descendants of 19th and 20th-century immigrants. The census identifies primary European ethnicities as German, Polish, Irish, and Italian. New waves of immigration came from the Middle East in the late 20th century, mostly Muslims and fewer Christian minorities from Lebanon, Palestine, Syria, Iraq, and Yemen. Dearborn has the proportionally largest Muslim population in the United States and the largest mosque in North America. In 2023, Dearborn became the first Arab-majority city in the US, with 55% of its residents claiming to be of Middle Eastern or North African ancestry in a 2023 survey.

== History ==
Before European encounter, the area had been inhabited for thousands of years by successive First Nations peoples. Historical tribes belonged mostly to the Algonquian-language family, especially the Council of Three Fires, the Potawatomi and related peoples. In contrast, the Huron (Wyandot) were Iroquoian speaking. French colonists had a trading post at Fort Detroit and a settlement developed there in the colonial period. Another developed on the south side of the Detroit River in what is now southwestern Ontario, near a Huron mission village. French and French-Canadian colonists also established farms at Dearborn in this period. France ceded all of its territory east of the Mississippi River in North America to Great Britain in 1763 after losing to Britain in the Seven Years' War.

Beginning in 1786, after the United States gained independence in the American Revolutionary War, more European Americans entered this region, settling in Detroit and the Dearborn area. With population growth, Dearborn Township was formed in 1833 and the village of Dearbornville in 1836, each named after Henry Dearborn, a general in the American Revolution who became Secretary of War under President Thomas Jefferson. The Town of Dearborn was incorporated in 1893. Through much of the 19th century, the area was largely rural and dependent on agriculture.

Stimulated by industrial development in Detroit and within its own limits, in 1927 Dearborn was established as a city. Its current borders result from a 1928 consolidation vote that merged Dearborn and neighboring Fordson (previously known as Springwells), which feared being absorbed into expanding Detroit.

According to historian James W. Loewen, in his book Sundown Towns (2005), Dearborn discouraged African Americans from settling in the city. In the early 20th century, both white and black people migrated to Detroit for industrial jobs. Over time, some city residents moved to the suburbs. Many of Dearborn's residents "took pride in the saying, 'The sun never set on a Negro in Dearborn'". According to Orville Hubbard, the segregationist mayor of Dearborn from 1942 to 1978, "as far as he was concerned, it was against the law for a Negro to live in his suburb." Hubbard told the Montgomery Advertiser in the mid-1950s, "Negroes can't get in here. Every time we hear of a Negro moving in, we respond quicker than you do to a fire."

The area between Dearborn and Fordson was undeveloped, and remains so in part. Once farm land, much of this property was bought by Henry Ford for his estate, Fair Lane, and for the Ford Motor Company World Headquarters. Later developments in this corridor were the Ford airport (later converted to the Dearborn Proving Grounds), and other Ford administrative and development facilities.

More recent additions are The Henry Ford (a reconstructed historic village and museum), the Henry Ford Centennial Library, the super-regional shopping mall Fairlane Town Center, and the Ford Performing Arts Center. The open land is planted with sunflowers and often with Ford's favorite crop of soybeans. The crops are never harvested.

The Arab American National Museum (AANM) opened in 2005, the first museum in the world devoted to Arab American history and culture. Arab Americans in Dearborn include descendants of Lebanese Christians who immigrated in the early twentieth century to work in the auto industry, and more recent Arab immigrants and their descendants from other, primarily Muslim nations.

On February 2, 2024, the Wall Street Journal published an opinion piece titled "Welcome to Dearborn, America's Jihad Capital", reporting that there were a large number of supporters of Islamic extremism in the area. Mayor Abdullah Hammoud said the article was inflammatory and was responsible for increased online hate speech against the city's citizens, so he increased police patrols.

A suit filed in September 2026 by a resident against the city and its mayor claimed that Dearborn uses official funds to cover the cost of displays for Muslim holidays, but has not fulfilled requests for similar displays for other religions, calling the city "a hostile place for Christians and Jews".

== Geography ==
According to the United States Census Bureau, the city has a total area of 24.5 square miles (63 km^{2}), of which 24.4 square miles (63 km^{2}) is land and 0.1 square miles (0.26 km^{2}) (0.37%) is water. The city developed on both sides of the Rouge River. An artificial waterfall/low head dam was constructed by Henry Ford on his estate to power its powerhouse. The Upper, Middle, and Lower Branches of the river come together in Dearborn. The river is widened and channeled near the Rouge Plant to allow lake freighter access.

Fordson Island (42°17′38″N 83°08′52″W) is an 8.4 acres (3.4 hectares) island about three miles (5 km) upriver on the River Rouge from its confluence with the Detroit River. It is the only major island in a tributary to the Detroit River. It was created in 1922 when engineers dug a secondary trench to reroute the River Rouge to increase navigability for shipping purposes, and businesses needed it to be navigable by the large lake freighters. The island is privately owned, has no public access, and is part of the city of Dearborn which has no frontage along the Detroit River.

Dearborn is among a small number of municipalities that own property in other cities. It owns the 626-acre (2.53 km^{2}) Camp Dearborn in Milford, Michigan, which is located 35 miles (56 km) from Dearborn. Dearborn was among an even smaller number of cities that hold property in another state. For a time, the city owned the Dearborn Towers apartment complex in Clearwater, Florida, but this has been sold. Camp Dearborn is considered part of the city of Dearborn. Revenues generated by camp admissions are incorporated into the city's budget.

== Climate ==
Climate data for Dearborn, Michigan (1991–2020 normals, extremes 1952–present)
Month	Jan	Feb	Mar	Apr	May	Jun	Jul	Aug	Sep	Oct	Nov	Dec	Year
Record high °F (°C)	65 (18)	71 (22)	86 (30)	90 (32)	95 (35)	104 (40)	102 (39)	102 (39)	100 (38)	91 (33)	77 (25)	69 (21)	104 (40)
Mean daily maximum °F (°C)	32.0 (0.0)	34.9 (1.6)	45.2 (7.3)	58.3 (14.6)	70.0 (21.1)	79.2 (26.2)	83.6 (28.7)	81.8 (27.7)	75.1 (23.9)	62.1 (16.7)	48.3 (9.1)	36.9 (2.7)	58.9 (14.9)
Daily mean °F (°C)	24.8 (−4.0)	27.0 (−2.8)	35.8 (2.1)	47.6 (8.7)	58.8 (14.9)	68.5 (20.3)	72.8 (22.7)	71.3 (21.8)	64.3 (17.9)	51.9 (11.1)	40.3 (4.6)	30.5 (−0.8)	49.5 (9.7)
Mean daily minimum °F (°C)	17.7 (−7.9)	19.1 (−7.2)	26.4 (−3.1)	36.9 (2.7)	47.5 (8.6)	57.8 (14.3)	62.0 (16.7)	60.8 (16.0)	53.4 (11.9)	41.6 (5.3)	32.3 (0.2)	24.0 (−4.4)	40.0 (4.4)
Record low °F (°C)	−20 (−29)	−14 (−26)	−9 (−23)	10 (−12)	23 (−5)	36 (2)	41 (5)	40 (4)	29 (−2)	19 (−7)	4 (−16)	−9 (−23)	−20 (−29)
Average precipitation inches (mm)	2.51 (64)	2.27 (58)	2.29 (58)	3.26 (83)	3.60 (91)	3.28 (83)	3.54 (90)	3.23 (82)	3.01 (76)	2.87 (73)	2.74 (70)	2.45 (62)	35.05 (890)
Average snowfall inches (cm)	11.7 (30)	7.3 (19)	5.7 (14)	0.6 (1.5)	0.0 (0.0)	0.0 (0.0)	0.0 (0.0)	0.0 (0.0)	0.0 (0.0)	0.0 (0.0)	0.9 (2.3)	4.6 (12)	30.8 (78)
Average precipitation days (≥ 0.01 in)	11.8	9.3	9.4	11.9	12.3	10.1	10.2	9.5	9.2	11.6	10.4	11.5	127.2
Average snowy days (≥ 0.1 in)	6.7	5.2	2.8	0.4	0.0	0.0	0.0	0.0	0.0	0.0	1.0	4.5	20.6
Source: NOAA

== Demographics ==
Historical population
Census	Pop.	Note	%±
1860	355		—
1870	530		49.3%
1880	410		−22.6%
1900	844		—
1910	911		7.9%
1920	2,470		171.1%
1930	50,358		1,938.8%
1940	63,589		26.3%
1950	94,994		49.4%
1960	112,007		17.9%
1970	104,199		−7.0%
1980	90,660		−13.0%
1990	89,286		−1.5%
2000	97,775		9.5%
2010	98,153		0.4%
2020	109,976		12.0%
U.S. Decennial Census; 2018 Estimate

=== 2020 census ===
Dearborn city, Michigan – Racial and ethnic composition Note: the US Census treats Hispanic/Latino as an ethnic category. This table excludes Latinos from the racial categories and assigns them to a separate category. Hispanics/Latinos may be of any race.
Race / Ethnicity (NH = Non-Hispanic)	Pop. 2000	Pop. 2010	Pop. 2020	% 2000	% 2010	% 2020
White alone (NH)	82,893	85,116	93,884	84.78%	86.72%	85.37%
Black or African American alone (NH)	1,225	3,895	4,346	1.25%	3.97%	3.95%
Native American or Alaska Native alone (NH)	214	166	107	0.22%	0.17%	0.10%
Asian alone (NH)	1,431	1,696	2,783	1.46%	1.73%	2.53%
Native Hawaiian or Pacific Islander alone (NH)	13	31	16	0.01%	0.03%	0.01%
Other race alone (NH)	124	171	549	0.13%	0.17%	0.50%
Mixed race or Multiracial (NH)	8,944	3,692	4,351	9.15%	3.76%	3.96%
Hispanic or Latino (any race)	2,931	3,386	3,940	3.00%	3.45%	3.58%
Total	97,775	98,153	109,976	100.00%	100.00%	100.00%

In 2020, 54.5% of the population reported Middle Eastern or North African ancestry. The most reported detailed ancestries were:

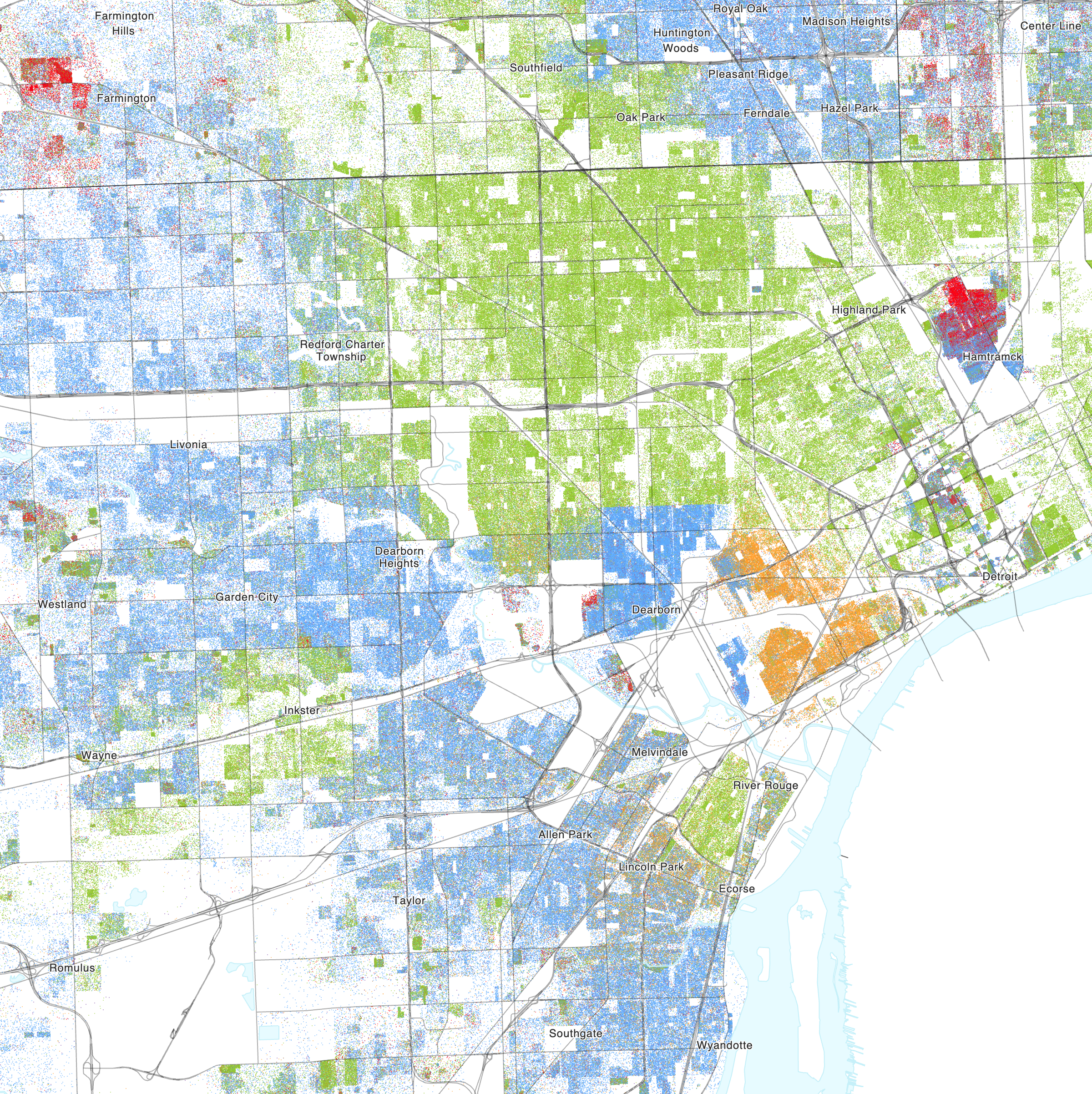
Map of racial distribution in Dearborn, 2020 U.S. census. Each dot is one person: ⬤ White ⬤ Black ⬤ Asian ⬤ Hispanic ⬤ Multiracial ⬤ Native American/other

- Lebanese (20.7%)
- Yemeni (13.2%)
- Arab (8.6%)
- German (8.2%)
- Irish (7.6%)
- English (6.4%)
- Polish (6%)
- Iraqi (4.5%)
- Italian (3.7%)
- African American (2.7%)

=== 2010 census ===
As of the 2010 census, the population of Dearborn was 98,153. The racial and ethnic composition was 89.1% White, 4.0% black or African-American, 0.2% Native American, 1.7% Asian, 0.2% Non-Hispanic of some other race, 4.0% reporting two or more races and 3.4% Hispanic or Latino. 41.7% were of Arab ancestry (categorized as "White" in Census collection data).

=== 2000 census ===
In the 2000 census, 61.9% spoke only English at home, 29.3% spoke Arabic, 1.9% Spanish, and 1.5% Polish. There were 36,770 households, out of which 31.3% had children under the age of 18 living with them, 51.0% were married couples living together, 9.4% had a female householder with no husband present, and 35.1% were non-families. 30.9% of all households were made up of individuals, and 14.7% had someone living alone who was 65 years of age or older. The average household size was 2.65 and the average family size was 3.42.

In the city, 27.8% of the population was under the age of 18, 8.3% was from 18 to 24, 29.2% from 25 to 44, 19.1% from 45 to 64, and 15.6% was 65 years of age or older. The median age was 34 years. For every 100 females, there were 99.0 males. For every 100 females age 18 and over, there were 96.5 males.

The median income for a household in the city was $44,560, and the median income for a family was $53,060. Males had a median income of $45,114 versus $33,872 for females. The per capita income for the city was $21,488. About 12.2% of families and 16.1% of the population were below the poverty line, including 24.4% of those under age 18 and 7.6% of those age 65 and over.

As of the 2012 estimate, Dearborn's population was thought to have fallen to 96,474, a decrease of 1.7% since 2010. Over the same period, though, SEMCOG, the local statistics agency of Metro Detroit Council of Governments, has estimated the city to have grown to 99,001, or an increase of 1.2% since 2000. SEMCOG's July 2014 estimate listed Dearborn with a population of 102,566.

=== Ethnic groups ===
Dearborn has a large community of descendants of ethnic Europeans who arrived as immigrants from the mid-19th into the 20th centuries. Their ancestors generally first settled in Detroit: Irish, German, Italians, and Polish. It is also a center of Maltese American settlement, from the Mediterranean island of Malta. Also attracted to jobs in the auto industry, some were among immigrant Maltese who first settled in Corktown.

The city has a small African-American population, many of whose ancestors came to the area from the rural South during the Great Migration of the early twentieth century.

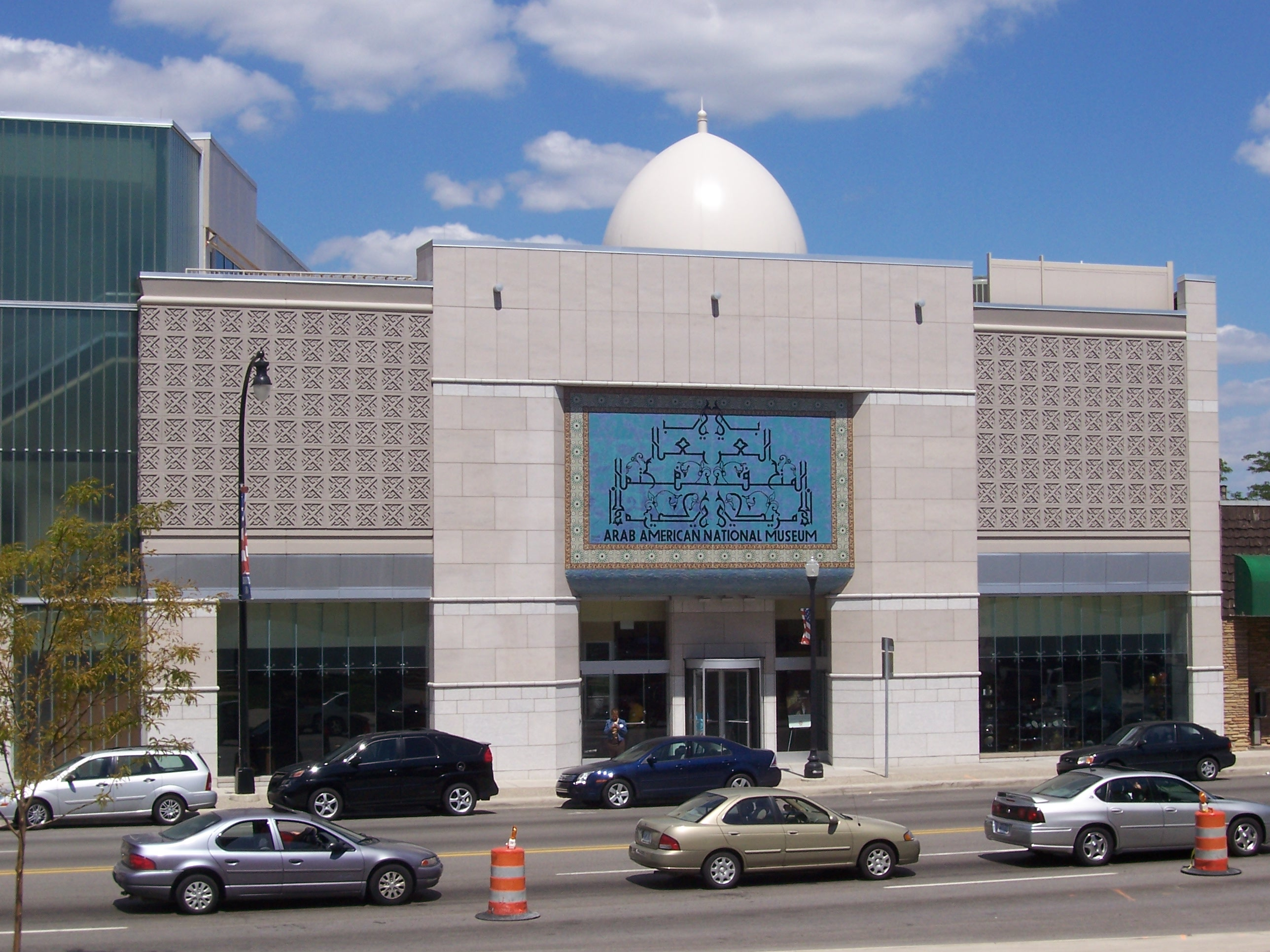
The Arab American National Museum is in Dearborn.

The city's population includes 40,000 Arab Americans. Per the 2000 census, Arab Americans totaled 29,181 or 29.85% of Dearborn's population; many are descendants of families who have been in the city since the early 20th century. The city has the largest proportion of Arab Americans in the United States, and has been called the "Capital of Arab America". As of 2006 Dearborn had the largest Lebanese American population in the United States.

The first Arab immigrants came in the early-to-mid-20th century to work in the automotive industry and were chiefly Christians from Lebanon, Palestine, and Syria. Other immigrants from the Middle East, such as Assyrians, have also immigrated to the area. Since then, immigrants from Yemen, Iraq and Palestine, most of whom are Muslim, have joined them. Lebanese Americans comprise the largest group of ethnic Arabs. The Arab Muslim community has built the Islamic Center of America serving the Arab Shia Muslim community and the American Moslem Society serving the Arab Sunni Muslim community. More Iraqi refugees have come, fleeing the continued war in their country since 2003.

Warren Avenue has become the commercial center of the Arab-American community. The Arab American National Museum is located in Dearborn. The museum was opened in January 2005 to celebrate the Arab-American community's history, culture and contributions to the United States.

In the 2019 U.S. Census estimates, the largest ethnic group were Lebanese Americans, and the second largest were Yemeni Americans.

=== Christian missionaries and politicians ===
In 2010, Nabeel Qureshi, David Wood, and two other people acting as Christian missionaries, were arrested at the Dearborn International Arab Festival. They had been handing out Christian literature aimed at Muslim believers. The four were prosecuted for breach of the peace. Police ordered them to stop filming the incident, to provide identification, and to move at least five blocks from the border of the fair. After reviewing the video evidence, the jury acquitted the defendants. The four defendants filed a separate civil suit against the city. Dearborn was found to have violated their constitutional rights related to freedom of speech. The city settled the lawsuit and issued a formal apology to the individuals.

Preacher Terry Jones of Gainesville, Florida, known for burning a Quran, the sacred book of Islam, planned a protest in 2011 outside the Islamic Center of America. Local authorities required him either to post a $45,000 "peace bond" to cover Dearborn's cost if Jones incited violence, or to go to trial. Jones contested that requirement, and he and his co-pastor Wayne Sapp refused to post the bond. They were held briefly in jail, while claiming violation of First Amendment rights. That night Jones was released by the court. The ACLU had filed an amicus brief in support of Jones's protest plans. One week later, on April 29, Jones led a rally at the Dearborn City Hall, in a designated free speech zone. Riot police were called out to control counter protesters. Jones also planned to speak at the annual Arab Festival on June 18, 2011, but his route was blocked by protesters, six of whom were arrested. Police said they did not have enough officers present to maintain safety. Christian missionaries accompanied Jones with their own protest signs.

On November 11, 2011, Wayne County Circuit Court Judge Robert Ziolkowski vacated the "breach of peace" ruling against Jones and Sapp on the grounds that they were denied due process. On April 7, 2012, Jones led another protest in front of the Islamic Center of America, where he spoke about Islam and free speech. The mosque officials had locked it down to prevent damage. The city used thirty police cars to block traffic from the area in an effort to prevent a counter protest.

== Economy ==
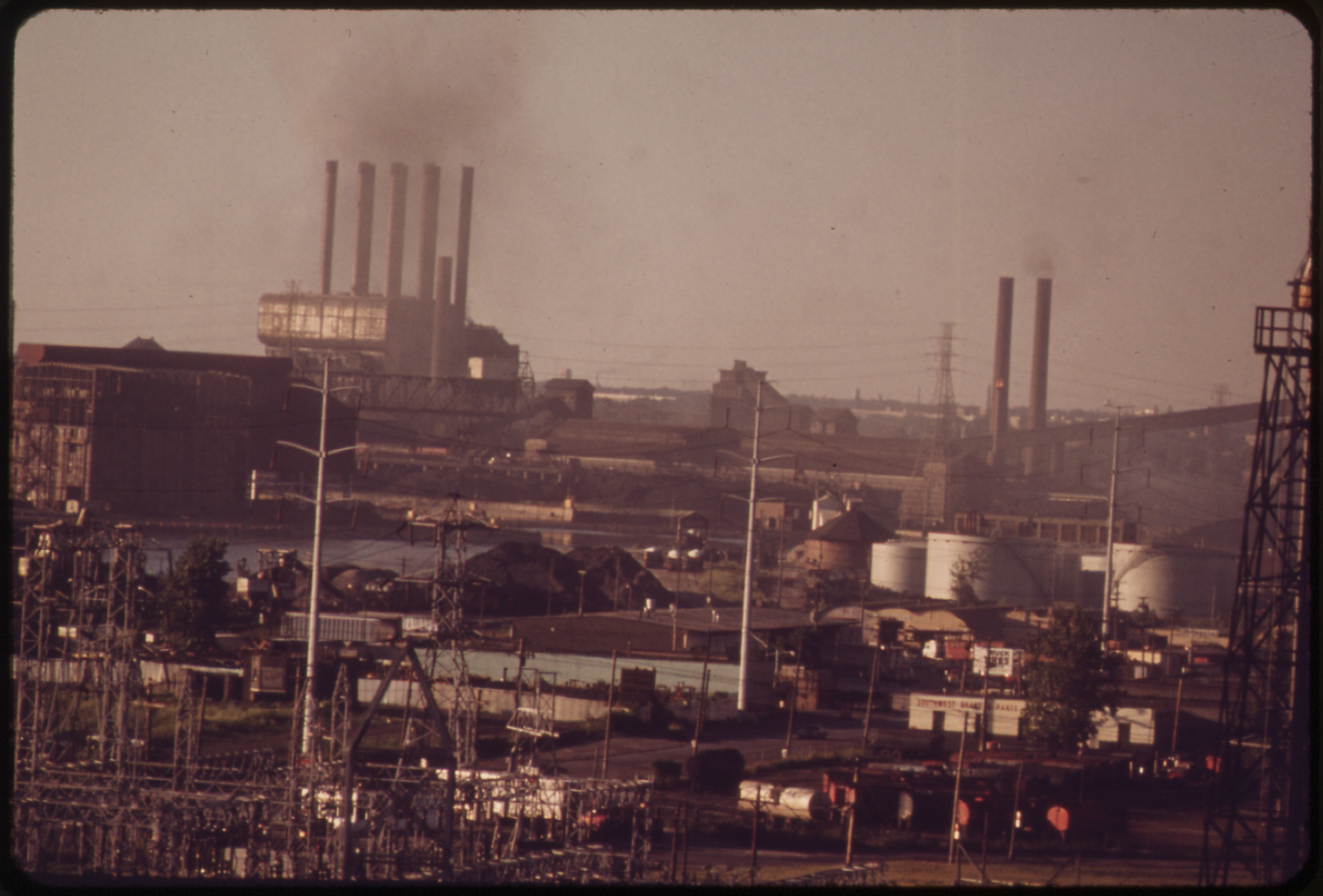
Dearborn skyline with Ford River Rouge Complex in background, 1973

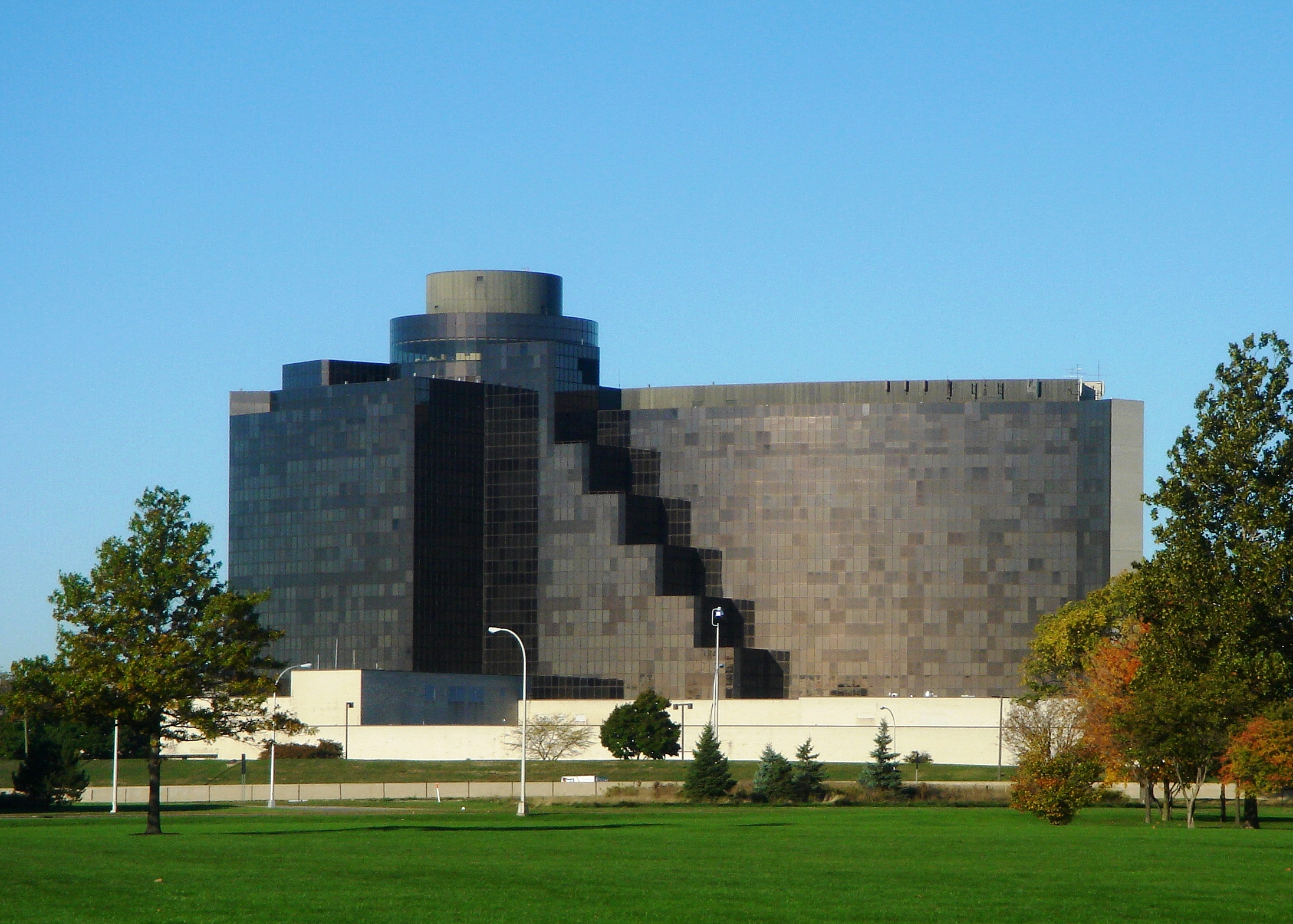
Edward Hotel and conference center

The world headquarters of Ford Motor Company is in Dearborn. Its Dearborn campus contains many research, testing, finance, and some production facilities. Ford Land controls the numerous properties owned by Ford, including sales and leasing to unrelated businesses, such as the Fairlane Town Center shopping mall. DFCU Financial, the largest credit union in Michigan, was created for Ford and related companies' employees.

One of the largest employers in Dearborn is Oakwood Healthcare System (now a part of Beaumont Health) H. Other major employers include auto suppliers like Visteon, education facilities such as Henry Ford College, and museums such as The Henry Ford. Other businesses headquartered in Dearborn include Carhartt (clothing), Eppinger (fishing lures), AAA Michigan (insurance), and the Society of Manufacturing Engineers.

=== Largest employers ===
According to the city's 2022 Comprehensive Annual Financial Report, the largest employers in the city are:

Five top employers in Dearborn
Rank	Employer	No. of employees
1	Ford Motor Company	43,080
2	Beaumont Health	7,883
3	School District of the City of Dearborn	2,283
4	AAA Michigan	1,316
5	Cleveland Cliffs – Dearborn Works	1,290
6	City of Dearborn	1,068
7	The Edison Institute (Henry Ford)	747
8	Carhartt Inc.	616
9	Hollingsworth Logistics Group	550
10	Ghafari Inc.	442

== Education ==
=== Colleges and universities ===
University of Michigan–Dearborn and Henry Ford College are located in Dearborn on Evergreen Road and are adjacent to each other. Central Michigan University offers classes in Dearborn. Career training schools include Kaplan Career Institute.

=== Primary and secondary schools ===
Dearborn residents, along with a small portion of Dearborn Heights residents, attend Dearborn Public Schools. The system operates 34 schools, including the major high schools Fordson High School, Dearborn High School, and Edsel Ford High School. The public schools serve more than 18,000 students in the fourth-largest district in the state.

Divine Child High School and Elementary School are private schools in Dearborn; the high school is the largest private coed high school in the area. Henry Ford Academy is a charter high school inside Greenfield Village and the Henry Ford Museum. Another charter secondary school is Advanced Technology Academy. Dearborn Schools operated the Clara B. Ford High School inside Vista Maria, a non-profit residential treatment agency for girls in Dearborn Heights. Clara B. Ford High School became a charter school in the 2007–08 school year.

A small portion of the city limits is within the Westwood Community School District. The sections of Dearborn within the district are zoned for industrial and commercial uses.

The Islamic Center of America operates the Muslim American Youth Academy (MAYA), an Islamic elementary and middle school.

The Roman Catholic Archdiocese of Detroit operates Sacred Heart Elementary School. It previously operated the St. Alphonsus School in Dearborn. In 2003 the archdiocese closed the high school of St. Alphonsus, and in 2005 closed the St. Alphonsus elementary school.

Global Educational Excellence operates multiple charter schools in Dearborn: Riverside Academy Early Childhood Center, Riverside Academy East Campus (K-5), and Riverside Academy West Campus (6–12).

Dearborn Christian School closed in 2014.

=== Public libraries ===
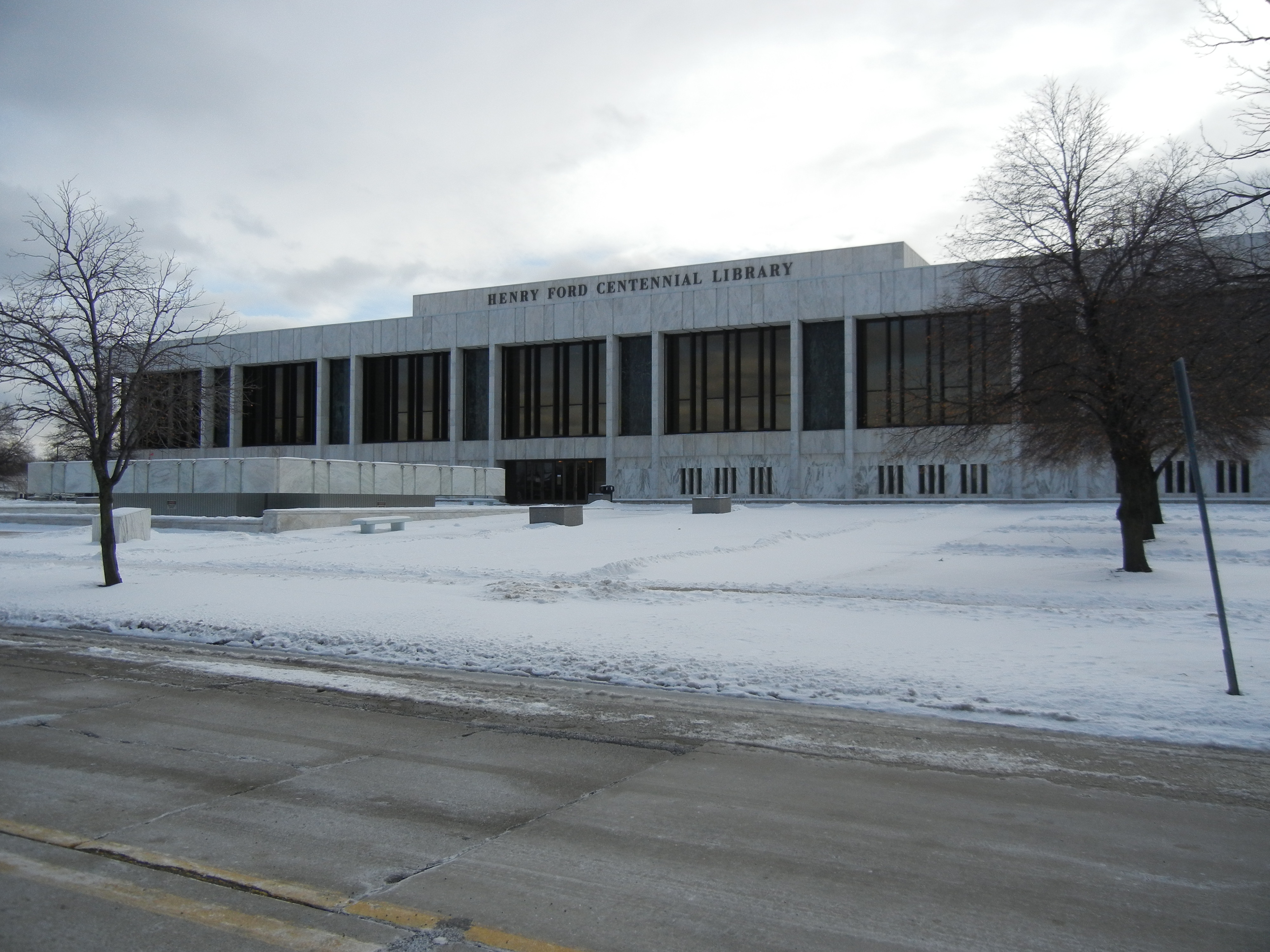
Henry Ford Centennial Library

Dearborn Public Library includes the Henry Ford Centennial Library, which is the main library; and the Bryant and Esper branches.

Dearborn's first public library opened in 1924 at the building now known as the Bryant Branch. This served as the main library until the Ford library opened in 1969. In 1970 what became known as the Mason building was classified as a branch library. The library was renamed in 1977 after Katharine Wright Bryant, who developed a plan for the library and campaigned for it.

Around April 1963 the Ford Motor Company granted the City of Dearborn $3 million to build a library as a memorial to Henry Ford. The company deeded 15.3 acres (6.2 ha) of vacant land for the public library to the city on July 30, 1963, the centennial or 100th anniversary of Henry Ford's birth. The Ford Foundation later granted the library an additional $500,000 for supplies and equipment. On November 25, 1969, the library was dedicated. Originally only the library had offices in the building but in 1979, the library gave up the western side's meeting rooms for the City of Dearborn Health Department.

The Esper Branch, the smallest branch, is located in what is known as the Arab residential quarter of the city, dedicated on October 12, 1953. Originally named the Warren Branch, this structure had replaced the Northeast Branch, which opened in a storefront in 1944. In October 1961, it was named after city councilman Anthony M. Esper.

=== Post office ===
During the years 1934 to 1943, during and after the Great Depression, murals were commissioned for federal public buildings in the United States through the Section of Painting and Sculpture, later called the Section of Fine Arts, of the Treasury Department. They often featured representation of local history. In 1938 artist Rainey Bennett painted an oil-on-canvas mural for the federal post offices in Dearborn titled Ten Eyck's Tavern on Chicago Road.

=== Sports facilities ===
Sports facilities include the Dearborn Ice Skating Center and the Dearborn Civic Center.

== Transportation ==
Amtrak, the national passenger rail system, provides service to Dearborn, operating its Wolverine three times daily in each direction between Chicago, Illinois and Pontiac, via Detroit. Baggage cannot be checked at this location; however, up to two suitcases, in addition to any "personal items" such as briefcases, purses, laptop bags, and infant equipment, are allowed on board as carry-ons. There is one rail stop in Dearborn: the John D. Dingell Transit Center. Amtrak operates on the Michigan Department of Transportation Michigan Line. This track runs from Dearborn to Kalamazoo, Michigan. CSX Transportation's Detroit Subdivision, Canadian National Railway/Grand Trunk Western Railroad's Dearborn Subdivision, and Conrail Shared Assets' Junction Yard Running Track also pass through Dearborn. Most of the freight traffic on these rails is related to the automotive industry.

Dearborn is served by buses of both the Detroit Department of Transportation (DDOT) and the Suburban Mobility Authority for Regional Transportation (SMART) systems.

From 1924 to 1947, Dearborn was the site of Ford Airport. It featured the world's first concrete runway and the first scheduled U.S. passenger service.

Launched in March 2021, SMART Flex is an on-demand public transit service launched in partnership with TransitTech company Via Transportation. SMART Flex is available to residents and workers in Dearborn, Troy, the Hall Road corridor between Utica and New Baltimore, Pontiac/Auburn Hills, and Farmington/Farmington Hills to book rides using the SMART Flex app.

== Arts and culture ==
=== Museums ===
- Arab American National Museum
- Automotive Hall of Fame
- The Henry Ford (Henry Ford Museum & Greenfield Village)
- Fair Lane Estate
- Dearborn Historical Museum
- The Stamelos Gallery at the University of Michigan Dearborn Mardigan Library
- The Alfred Berkowitz Gallery at the University of Michigan Dearborn Mardigan Library

=== Parks ===
- Crowley Park and Field
- Ford Field Park
- Ford Woods Park
- Hemlock Park
- Levagood Park
- Lapeer Park
- Rouge Gateway Park / Trail

=== Theaters ===
- Ford Community & Performing Arts Center
- Ford-Wyoming Drive-In

=== Architecture ===
- Edward Hotel & Convention Center
- Henry Ford II World Center
- Ford World Headquarters
- Ford Homes Historic District
- Islamic Center of America

Several designs are by architect Albert Kahn for Henry Ford.

- Dearborn Inn
- Ford Engineering Laboratory
- Ford River Rouge Complex

== Government ==
Dearborn has a mayor-council form of government. As of 2021, the Mayor of the City of Dearborn is Abdullah Hammoud. The City Clerk is George T. Darany. The City Council President is Michael T. Sareini.

Built in 1922, the Dearborn City Hall Complex was in operation until 2014 when government operations moved to the new Dearborn Administrative Center. The former city hall was redeveloped by Artspace Projects to preserve affordable and sustainable space for artists and arts organizations.

== Politics ==
Dearborn has historically firmly voted for the Democratic Party.

In 2016, Bernie Sanders received the most votes in the heavily Muslim and Arab parts of Dearborn in the 2016 Democratic Party presidential primaries.

In the 2020 United States presidential election, within Dearborn, of the voters, 68.8% selected Joe Biden and 29.9% selected Donald Trump.

In 2021, Niraj Warikoo of the Detroit Free Press reported that Yemeni Americans in Dearborn were advocating for more of a role in their city's government.

In the 2022 Michigan elections, there was a shift in east Dearborn (heavily Arab and Muslim) toward the Republican Party as LGBTQ+ materials in schools became a political issue. According to Niraj Warikoo of The Detroit News, "Democrats still won the city overall by a comfortable margin".

In the 2024 Michigan Democratic presidential primary, the Uncommitted vote won a majority in Dearborn, as well as in the cities of Hamtramck and Dearborn Heights. All three cities have a significant Arab American and Muslim population. They protested against Biden over his handling of the Gaza war.

In the run-up to the 2024 United States presidential election, mayor Abdullah Hammoud refused to endorse President Joe Biden for re-election due to the government's position in the Gaza war. In that election, within Dearborn, 42.48% of the voters voted for Trump, 36.26% voted for Kamala Harris, and 18.37% voted for Jill Stein, the Green party candidate. Trump became the first Republican to win the city since the 2000 presidential election.

== Media ==
The metropolitan-area newspapers are The Detroit News and the Detroit Free Press.

The Dearborn & Dearborn Heights Press and Guide publishes local news for Dearborn and the neighboring Dearborn Heights. The Arab American News is published in Dearborn.

== Timeline ==
=== European exploration and colonization ===
- 1603 – French lay claim to unidentified territory in this region, naming it New France.
- July 24, 1701 – Antoine de la Mothe Cadillac and his soldiers first land at what is now Detroit.
- November 29, 1760 – The British take control of the area from France.
- 1780 – Pierre Dumais clears farm near what became Morningside Street in Dearborn's South End.

=== Early U.S. history ===
- 1783 – By terms of the Treaty of Paris ending the American Revolutionary War, Great Britain cedes territory south of the Great Lakes to the United States, although the British retain practical control of the Detroit area and several other settlements until 1797.
- 1786 – Agreed year of first permanent settler in present-day Dearborn.
- 1787 – Territory of the US north and west of the Ohio River is officially proclaimed the Northwest Territory.
- December 26, 1791 – Detroit environs become part of Kent County, Ontario.
- 1795 – James Cissne becomes first settler in what is now west Dearborn.
- 1796 – Wayne County is formed by proclamation of the acting governor of the Northwest Territory. Its original area is 2,000,000 square miles (5,200,000 km^{2}), stretching from Cleveland, Ohio, to Chicago, Illinois, and northwest to Canada.
- May 7, 1800 – Indiana Territory, created out of part of Northwest Territory, although the eastern half of Michigan including the Dearborn area, was not attached to Indiana Territory until Ohio was admitted as a state in 1803.
- January 11, 1805 – Michigan Territory officially created out of a part of the Indiana Territory.
- June 11, 1805 – Fire destroys most of Detroit.
- November 15, 1815 – Current boundaries of Wayne County drawn, county split into 18 townships.
- January 5, 1818 – Springwells Township established by Gov. Lewis Cass.
- October 23, 1824 – Bucklin Township created by Gov. Lewis Cass. The area ran from Greenfield to approximately Haggerty and from Van Born to Eight Mile.
- 1826 – Conrad Ten Eyck builds Ten Eyck Tavern at Michigan Avenue and Rouge River.
- 1827 – Wayne County's boundaries changed to its current 615 square miles (1,593 km^{2}).
- April 12, 1827 – Springwells and Bucklin townships formally organized and laid out by gubernatorial act.
- October 29, 1829 – Bucklin Township split along what is today Inkster Road into Nankin (west half) and Pekin (east half) townships.
- March 21, 1833 – Pekin Township renamed Redford Township.
- March 31, 1833 – Greenfield Township created from north and west sections of Springwells Township, including what is now today east Dearborn.
- April 1, 1833 – Dearborn Township created from southern half of Redford Township south of Bonaparte Avenue (Joy Road).
- 1833 – Detroit Arsenal built.
- October 23, 1834 – Dearborn Township renamed Bucklin Township.
- March 26, 1836 – Bucklin Township renamed Dearborn Township.
- January 26, 1837 – Michigan admitted to the Union as the 26th state. Stevens T. Mason is first governor.
- 1837 – Michigan Central Railroad extended through Springwells Township. Hamlet of Springwells rises along railroad.
- April 5, 1838 – Village of Dearbornville incorporates. Village later unincorporated on May 11, 1846.
- 1849 Detroit annexes Springwells Township east of Brooklyn Street.
- April 2, 1850 – Greenfield Township annexes another section of Springwells Township.
- February 12, 1857 – Detroit annexes Springwells Township east of Grand Boulevard.
- March 25, 1873 – Springwells Township annexes back section of Greenfield Township south of Tireman
- May 28, 1875 – Postmaster general changes name of Dearbornville post office to Dearborn post office, hence changing the city's name.
- 1875 – Detroit Arsenal closed.
- 1875 – Detroit annexes another section of Springwells Township.
- 1876 – William A. Nowlin writes The Bark Covered House in honor of country's 100th birthday.
- June 20, 1884 – Detroit annexes Springwells Township east of Livernois.
- 1889 – First telephone installed in Dearborn at St. Joseph's retreat.

=== Incorporation as village ===
- March 24, 1893 – Village of Dearborn incorporates.
- 1906 – Detroit annexes another section of Springwells Township.
- 1916 – Henry, Clara, and Edsel Ford move to Dearborn.
- 1916 – Detroit annexes more of Springwells Township, forming Dearborn's eastern boundary.
- 1917 – Rouge "Eagle" Plant opens.
- November 1, 1919 – The first house numbering ordinance in Dearborn starts. Residents required to place standard plate number on right side of the main house entrance five feet up.
- December 9, 1919 – Springwells Township incorporates as village of Springwells.
- October 16, 1922 – Springwells Township annexes small section of Dearborn Township east of present-day Greenfield Road.
- December 27, 1923 – Voters approve incorporation of Springwells as a city. It officially became a city April 7, 1924.
- September 9, 1924 – Village of Warrendale incorporates.
- November 1924 – Ford Airport opens.
- April 6, 1925 – Warrendale voters and residents of remaining Greenfield Township approve annexation by Detroit.
- May 26, 1925 – Village of Dearborn annexes large portion of Dearborn Township.
- December 23, 1925 – Springwells changes name to city of Fordson.
- February 15, 1926 – First U.S. airmail delivery made, going from Ford Airport in Dearborn to Cleveland.
- September 14, 1926 – Election approves incorporation of village of Inkster. Unincorporated part of Dearborn Township split into two unconnected sections.
- October 11, 1926 – Only dirigible to ever moor in Dearborn docks at Ford Airport.

=== Reincorporation as city ===
- February 14, 1927 – Village of Dearborn residents approve vote to become a city.
- June 12, 1928 – Voters in Dearborn, Fordson and part of Dearborn Township vote to consolidate into one city.
- January 9, 1929 – Clyde Ford elected as first mayor of Dearborn.
- 1929 – Henry Ford Museum and Greenfield Village opens.
- July 1, 1931 – Dearborn Inn opens as one of the first airport hotels in world.
- March 7, 1932 – Ford Hunger March crosses Dearborn city limits. Four marchers are shot to death by police and Ford service men; a fifth dies of his injuries a few months later.
- 1936 – John Carey becomes second mayor of Dearborn.
- June 19, 1936 – Montgomery Ward opens in Dearborn.
- May 26, 1937 – Harry Bennett's Ford "service" men beat United Auto Workers (UAW) official Richard Frankensteen in the Battle of the Overpass
- June 21, 1941 – Ford Motor Company signs its first union contract.
- 1939 – The Historic Springwells Park Neighborhood is established by Edsel B. Ford to provide company executives and auto workers with upscale housing accommodations.
- January 6, 1942 – Orville L. Hubbard takes office as third mayor of Dearborn.
- April 7, 1947 – Henry Ford dies.
- October 20, 1947 – Dearborn City Council approves purchase of land near Milford, Michigan, for what would become Camp Dearborn. First section of camp opens following year.
- October 21, 1947 – Ford Airport officially closes.
- 1950 – First Pleasant Hours senior citizen group formed.
- 1950 – Dearborn Historical Museum formally established.
- January 1953 – Oakwood Hospital formally opened and dedicated.
- April 22, 1958 – Election held to annex part of South Dearborn Township to Dearborn. Proposal fails.
- 1959 – University of Michigan (Dearborn Campus) opens.
- April 6, 1959 – Election held to annex part of North Dearborn Township to Dearborn. Proposal fails.
- 1960 – Remaining parts of Dearborn Township incorporated as Dearborn Heights, Michigan.
- 1962 – St. Joseph's retreat closed and razed.
- 1962 – New Henry Ford Community College campus dedicated.
- November 9, 1962 – Ford Rotunda burns down.
- 1967 – Dearborn Towers in Clearwater, Florida opens.
- March 2, 1976 – Fairlane Town Center opens.
- 1978 – John B. O' Reilly Sr. becomes fourth mayor of Dearborn.
- November 6, 1981 – Cable television reaches first home in Dearborn, on Abbot Street.
- December 16, 1982 – Orville Hubbard dies.
- 1986 – Michael Guido becomes fifth mayor of Dearborn.
- 1993 – Michael Guido is the first mayor to run unopposed.
- 2006 – Michael Guido dies at the age of 52 during his sixth term, the only mayor to die in office.
- 2006 – John B. O'Reilly Jr. is to become temporary Mayor. O'Reilly's father was the mayor who had preceded Mayor Guido.
- 2007 – John B. O'Reilly Jr. is elected sixth mayor of Dearborn, winning 93.97% of the vote.
- 2008 – John B. O'Reilly Sr. dies at the age of 89; he was mayor of Dearborn (1978–1985) and also served as chief of police for 11 years.
- 2022 – Abdullah Hammoud becomes seventh mayor of Dearborn.
- 2025 – John B. O'Reilly Jr. dies at the age of 76; he was mayor of Dearborn (2007–2022) and also served on the Dearborn City Council for 17 years.

== Notable people ==
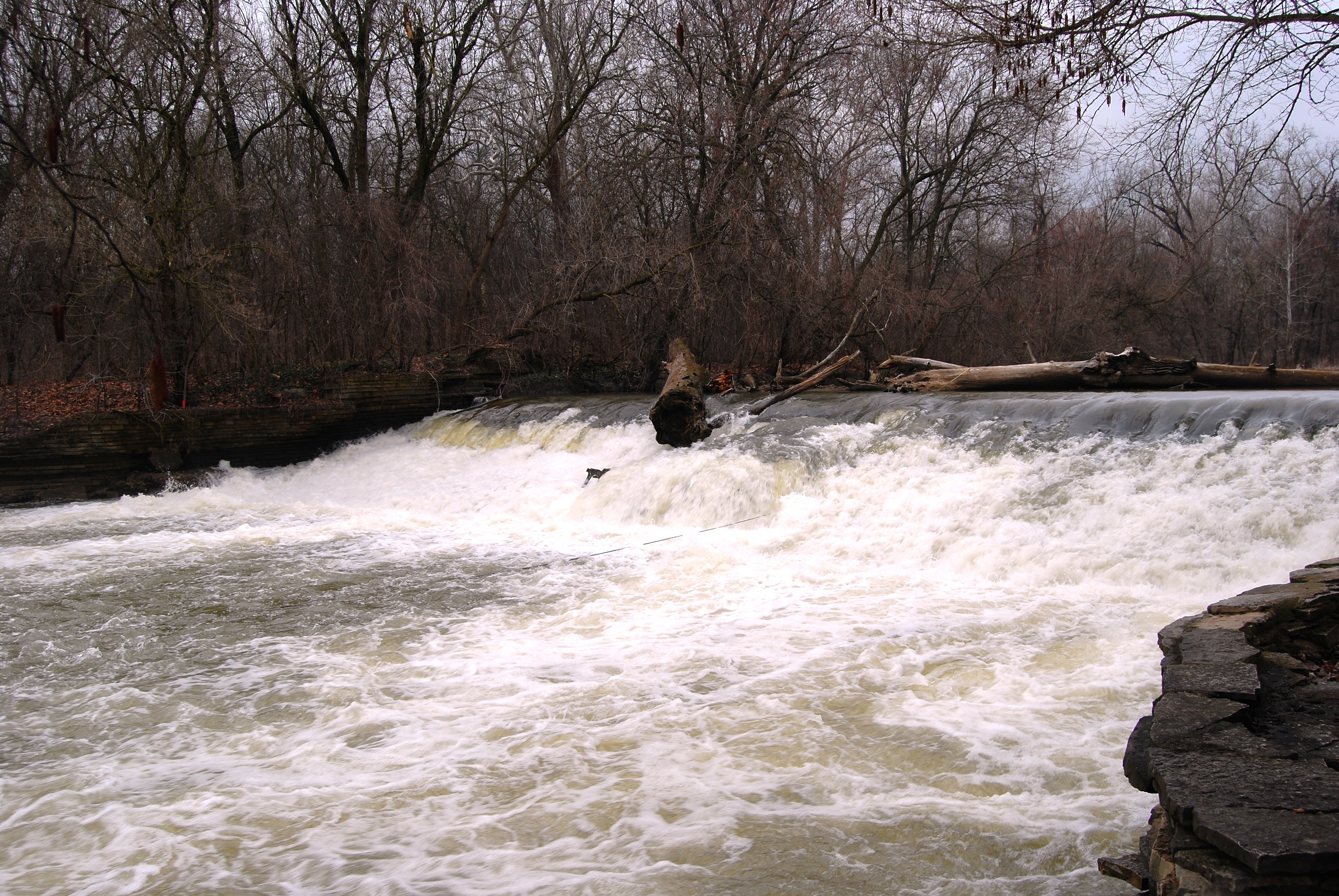
River Rouge from Henry Ford's estate

- Myles Amine – Olympic bronze medalist in freestyle wrestling at 2020 Summer Olympics representing San Marino
- Frankie Andreu – professional cyclist, rode Tour De France multiple years
- Anthony Bass – pitcher for the Miami Marlins
- Najah Bazzy – humanitarian and interfaith leader
- Robert Bierman – author
- Dave Brandon – CEO of Toys "R" Us, chairman of Domino's Pizza
- Claire-Marie Brisson – academic, Harvard University faculty
- David Burtka – chef and actor, married to Neil Patrick Harris
- Brian Calley – 63rd Lieutenant Governor of Michigan
- Garrett Clayton – actor
- Jim Cummins – NHL player
- Haz Al-Din – co-founder of the American Communist Party, political theorist and streamer
- John Dingell – former dean of the U.S. House of Representatives, longest-serving Congressman
- Agnes Dobronski – Michigan educator and legislator
- Kristen Doute – television personality, best known for Vanderpump Rules
- Ronnie Duman – auto racer
- Chad Everett – actor, Medical Center, The Last Challenge, Made in Paris, Airplane II: The Sequel
- Rima Fakih – Miss Michigan USA 2010, Miss USA 2010.
- Henry Ford – iconic automaker, founder of Ford Motor Company
- Edsel Ford – Henry Ford's son, second president of Ford Motor and co-namesake of Fordson
- Scott Freidheim – CEO, Investor and Author
- Dan Gheesling – winner of Big Brother 10 (U.S.) and runner-up on Big Brother 14 (U.S.)
- Russ Gibb – concert promoter and media figure
- George Z. Hart – Michigan state senator
- Ahmad Harajly – rugby player (USA Rugby)
- Orville L. Hubbard – Mayor of Dearborn from 1942 to 1978
- Al Iafrate – NHL defenseman
- Art James – TV quiz-show host
- Ahmad Musa Jibril – Islamic preacher
- Dakota Joshua – professional ice hockey player
- Ali Kabbani – better known as "Myth", YouTube live streamer and professional gamer
- John C. Kornblum – diplomat, former Ambassador to Germany
- Mei Lin – chef, winner of Top Chef: Boston
- Derek Lowe – Major League Baseball pitcher, 2004 World Series champion with Boston Red Sox
- Don Matheson – actor, Land of the Giants
- Nancy Milford – author and biographer
- Alan Mulally – CEO of Ford Motor Company
- Dorothy Naum – baseball player
- Johnny Pacar – actor, Flight 29 Down, Make It or Break It, Now You See It...
- Eugenia Paul – actress and dancer
- George Peppard – film actor, known for Breakfast at Tiffany's, How the West Was Won, and more
- Tom Price – United States Secretary of Health and Human Services
- Brian Rafalski – NHL defenseman (New Jersey Devils, Detroit Red Wings)
- Doug Ross – college ice hockey coach
- Soony Saad – soccer player
- Robert Saleh – NFL head coach of the Tennessee Titans
- Scott Sanderson – All-Star Major League Baseball pitcher in 19 Major League seasons for seven teams
- Norbert Schemansky – four-time Olympic medalist in weightlifting
- Suzanne Sena – host of IFC program Onion News Network and former Fox News anchor
- Serena Shim – Lebanese-American journalist
- Jim Snyder – Major League Baseball player and manager
- Edward Stinson – aviation pioneer
- Pat Shurmur – NFL offensive coordinator and former head coach
- Gary Wayne – former pitcher for the Minnesota Twins

== See also ==
- History of the Middle Eastern people in Metro Detroit
- List of sundown towns in the United States
