= Aquapendens =

Aquapendens may refer to:

- Acquapendente (in Latin), a city and comune in the province of Viterbo, in Lazio, Italy
- Aquapendens, sometimes used as an abbreviated Latin name for various people "of Acquapendente", such as Hieronymus Fabricius ab Aquapendente
