= Ellen Cantor =

American artist (1961–2013)

Ellen Cantor (1961–2013) was an American artist. Cantor was known for combining pornography, politics, pop culture and the handmade in her paintings, drawings, sculptures, videos, and films. She was known for her experimental film work, notably Pinochet Porn, an experimental film in the form of a soap opera, following children growing up during Augusto Pinochet’s regime in Chile. Born in Detroit, Michigan to a Jewish family, Cantor completed her studies at Brandeis University in 1983 with a degree in painting. She went on to study at the Skowhegan School of Painting and Sculpture in 1991.

== Life and career ==
In an interview in 2008, Cantor described her work as “humorous, but also quite disturbing.” Having grown up in the first generation after the Holocaust, Cantor describes a “strong sense of mourning” in the greater Detroit Jewish community:

From an early age in religious school and amongst family I heard survivors' horrific eyewitness accounts — memory was considered a duty to history and future survival. Also, our Rabbi, Morris Adler, was murdered in front of the congregation. And there was social unrest in Detroit, racism — the race riots. Anti-semitism was, for all practical purposes, institutionalized in Detroit, given Henry Ford’s relationship to Hitler, his anti-Semitic treatises and hiring practices, and Father Caughlin's public sermons. Most of my work is informed by the concerns brought up by these historical circumstances. But I also have the counter-memory of a utopian outlook, the architecture and river, the lakes and natural beauty I grew up with.

In the last five years of her life, Cantor worked on Pinochet Porn. The film was shot from Circus Lives from Hell, a hand drawn script by Cantor. Cantor cited Mel Brooks, Shalom Asch, and Hernandez Brother’s Love and Rockets comic book as influences. In the film, Cantor brings together themes of sexuality, identity, and control:

"I don’t approach sex as a subversion or taboo. I consider sexuality normal, particularly when depicting love relationships. The title Pinochet Porn salutes the film characters’ intimate relationships, but refers more to the dictatorship itself – to the regime’s systematic, sadistic, destruction of individual lives – policies furtively upheld by the United States, United Kingdom and the Papacy. In light of this collusion and abuse of power, the film questions, “Is tragedy a choice”?"

== Solo exhibitions and screenings ==
- Be My Baby, Delfina, London, 1999; XL Xavier LaBoulbenne, New York, 1998 and 1996; Feigen, Chicago, 1997; Cabinet, London, 1996; and Postmasters, New York, 1995.
- Video Drawing 1996-2001, Transmission Gallery, Glasgow, 2000; Kunstbunker, Nuremberg, 2001.
- Ellen Cantor Cerith Wyn Evans, Kunsthalle Wien, 2002; Sketch, London, 2005; Prince Charles Cinema, London, 2005.
- Path of Sun – Road of Life, 1000000 mph, London, 2006
- Within a Budding Grove, Participant Inc, New York, 2008; White Cubicle, London, 2008; Abbt Projects, Zurich, 2007
- Subversive Cinema: Ellen Cantor, curated by Lux, Zoo art fair, London, 2009
- Serpentine Cinema: Film in Progress, Serpentine Gallery, curated by Nicola Lees/Victoria Brooks, London, 2009
- Séance de projection de films, La GAD, Gallerie Arnaud Deschin, Marseille, 2011
- The Dictator & the Maid, The Black Mariah, Cork, Ireland, curated by Dallas Seitz & The Black Mariah, 2014
- Ellen Cantor at Künstlerhaus Stuttgart and Cinderella Syndrome at Wattis Institute for Contemporary Arts, San Francisco curated by Jamie Stevens and Fatima Hellberg, 2015–16
- Ellen Cantor: My Perversion is the Belief in True Love, Galerie Isabella Bortozzi, Germany, 2018

== Death and legacy ==
Cantor died of lung cancer on April 22, 2013, in her apartment in New York City after a year-long illness.
