= Abraham Littman =

Yiddish theater producer in Detroit

- אברהם ליטמאן
- Born: December 10, 1880; Borisov, Minsk Guberniya, Russian Empire
- Died: August 10, 1962 (aged 81); Brooklyn, Kings County, New York
- Citizenship: United States
- Occupations: Theatrical manager, impresario
- Years active: 1900–1950
- Organization: Hebrew Actors' Union
- Spouse: Yetta Littman (1905–1947)

Abraham Littman (אברהם ליטמאן) (December 11, 1880 – August 10, 1962), born in Borisov (Barysaw), in the Russian Empire, was a Yiddish-language theatrical producer, director, and impresario active in the United States. He was best known as the owner and operator of Littman's People's Theater in Detroit, Michigan, which operated from 1927 to 1944 in the city's predominantly Jewish 12th Street neighborhood.

== Early life ==
Born in Minsk Guberniya of the Russian Empire in 1880, Littman immigrated to the United States with his sister at the age of fifteen in 1895. He began working in textile industry sweatshops, but found himself attracted to the thriving Yiddish theatre scene on New York's Lower East Side. In 1905 he married Yetta Silberman.

== Career ==
=== Touring companies and time in Canada ===
Littman began his Yiddish theater career as an actor but quickly found that his poor eyesight did not permit him to continue in that position. Until 1923, he served as a director and manager of various touring companies at theaters around the Great Lakes region, including Toronto's Yiddish-language National Theater as well as in Buffalo, Pittsburgh, and Rochester.

=== The Yiddish Playhouse ===
In 1924, Littman and his business partner Misha Fishzon purchased a small theater on Hastings Street in Detroit which had up until that point been called the Circle Theater. Though the theater had hosted touring companies operated by managers such as Leon Krim, no Yiddish-language theatrical troupe had yet made Detroit their permanent home. Littman and Fishzon renamed it to the Yiddish Playhouse and began theatrical productions for the 1924–25 season to great acclaim with a troupe recruited from the Hebrew Actors' Union.

Though Hastings Street had, since the 1880s, been the center of Detroit's Jewish community, demographic shifts engendered by the Immigration Act of 1924 meant that the community's geographic center was shifting to the northwest and Hastings Street was becoming a majority-Black neighborhood. As such, the theater-going Jewish community became increasingly unwilling to travel to what they viewed as a slum. Local reviewers noted that despite good acting and well-renowned plays, the theater was too small for the audiences it attracted. A reviewer in the Detroit Jewish Chronicle remarked after a performance by the Vilna Troupe in March 1926 that:

The depressing inadequacies of the Circle Theater . . . were never so apparent as during these remarkable performances of the Dybbuk. One felt that the artists were using symbols and substituting drops for scenic effects. Despite every effort to concentrate upon the delightfully spoken lines, one could not but feel the synagogue walls were crowding the congregation out of the place. . . . Messrs. Littman and Fischson [sic] have done splendidly under most trying circumstances. They are anxious to give Detroit Jewry the best available Yiddish drama, but they cannot do it on Hastings Street . . . Are there not men and women sufficiently interested in Yiddish drama to help build a theater in a Jewish locality?

At the end of the 1925–26 season it was announced that the Playhouse would close and that a new, purpose-built theater designed by architect Morris Finkel, later known for designing Ann Arbor's Michigan Theater, would be constructed in the up-and-coming 12th Street neighborhood at the corner of 12th and Seward. Littman's troupe spent the 1926–27 season performing at the Majestic Theatre on Woodward Avenue.

=== Littman's People's Theater ===
The new theater, named Littman's People's Theater after its impresario, opened in September 1927, having been built at a cost of $250,000. Though the theater was lavish in its decorations, the architect had neglected to include dressing rooms for the actors in the design. The theater's attic was repurposed as an area for the cast to dress and makeup, requiring actors to make a grueling climb up and down three flights of stairs for every change of costume.

==== Influenza epidemic of 1928–29 ====
The theater was struck badly by the flu epidemic which affected Detroit and the rest of the United States during the winter of 1928–29. Actor Herman Yablokoff recalled in his memoir that two actors, Wolf Shumsky and Harry Reitz, died of the flu during productions that winter. Because of these deaths, members of the Hebrew Actors' Union refused to play in Detroit. The season continued, but with great difficulty.

==== The Great Depression ====
Like many theatrical enterprises, Littman's People's Theater was impacted significantly by the Great Depression. Declining revenues and increased costs led to the theater producing fewer and fewer high-quality "literary" plays and replacing more and more live productions with Yiddish-language "talkies." In the spring of 1937, Littman briefly rented out the theater to the Works Progress Administration's Federal Theatre Project. Yiddish productions continued the following autumn, albeit infrequently.

==== The Jewish Theater Guild of Detroit ====
As it became clear that the theater was unlikely to survive, leaders of the Jewish community came together in hopes of subsidizing its existence with communally provided funding via the newly formed Jewish Theater Guild of Detroit (Yidisher gezelshaftlekher teater fun Detroit). These leaders, including Rabbi Morris Adler of Congregation Shaarey Zedek, raised money in hopes of keeping Littman's open permanently. During 1942–43, the Guild put on productions of Peretz Hirschbein's famed play Green Fields starring Jacob Ben-Ami.

Despite the best efforts of the Guild's executive committee, contract negotiations with Hebrew Actors' Union director Reuven Guskin failed due to budgetary concerns and the project quickly ran out of money.

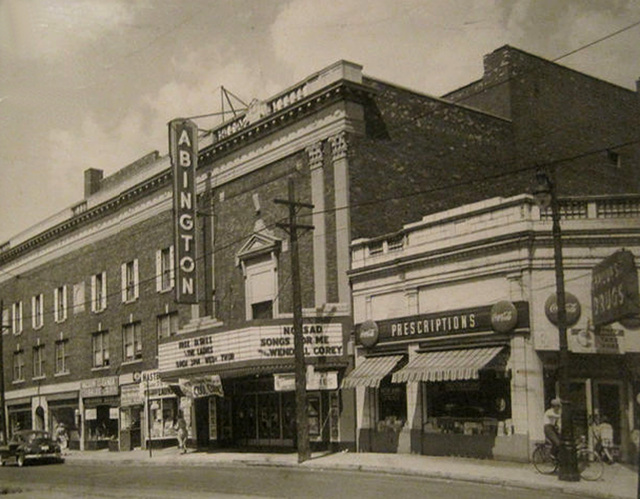
The Littman's People's Theater building under the name Abington Theater, c.1945–1953.

==== Decline & Closure ====
Littman's People's Theater remained operational at a reduced frequency of performances until 1944, when Littman lost ownership of the theater and began managing touring companies at the Detroit Masonic Temple's Scottish Rite Auditorium. By this time Yiddish theater in general was in decline as the Jewish community had become significantly more assimilated to American culture and language. That autumn, Detroit Jewish News columnist Philip Slomovitz lamented the theater's closure and celebrated Littman's dedication to the Jewish community of Detroit:

For 21 years, Abraham Littman had made the Yiddish theater his life's work. Year in and year out, he struggled to perpetuate activities for the Yiddish stage. This year, for the first time, he is compelled to reduce his efforts and to limit them to just a few specially sponsored performances.

. . . We record these facts with deep regret. Mr. Littman has earned the community's support and encouragement. But, apparently, the Yiddish theater-supporting audience has been considerably reduced and there is little hope of the theater's permanent revival. There is no longer a permanent home for Yiddish theater and another institution has been reduced to a minimum.

. . . it is a source of regret to us that Mr. Littman should be subjected to disillusionment after many years of loyal services to the Yiddish theater.

As Slomovitz predicted, the Yiddish theater did not reopen. In 1945 it was renamed the Abington Theatre and operated until 1953 as a movie theater, closing again and then briefly reopening as the Goldcoast Theatre. The building was likely destroyed during the 1967 Detroit riot or in the years following when 12th Street was widened.

=== Late Career & Death ===
Littman remained in Detroit, continuing to manage Yiddish theater productions at the Detroit Masonic Temple and other locations for some years. His wife, Yetta, died in January 1947 three months after suffering a severe brain hemorrhage.

The last mention of Littman in the Detroit Jewish News or Jewish Chronicle was in 1950. He died in 1962 at the age of eighty-one in Brooklyn, New York.
