= History of the Jews in Metro Detroit =

Jews have been living in Metro Detroit since it was first founded and have been prominent in many aspects the city's history. The Jewish community has also seen tensions and faced anti-Jewish backlash. Various Jewish organizations and institutions have been established. Many are now outside Detroit city limits.

== Background information ==
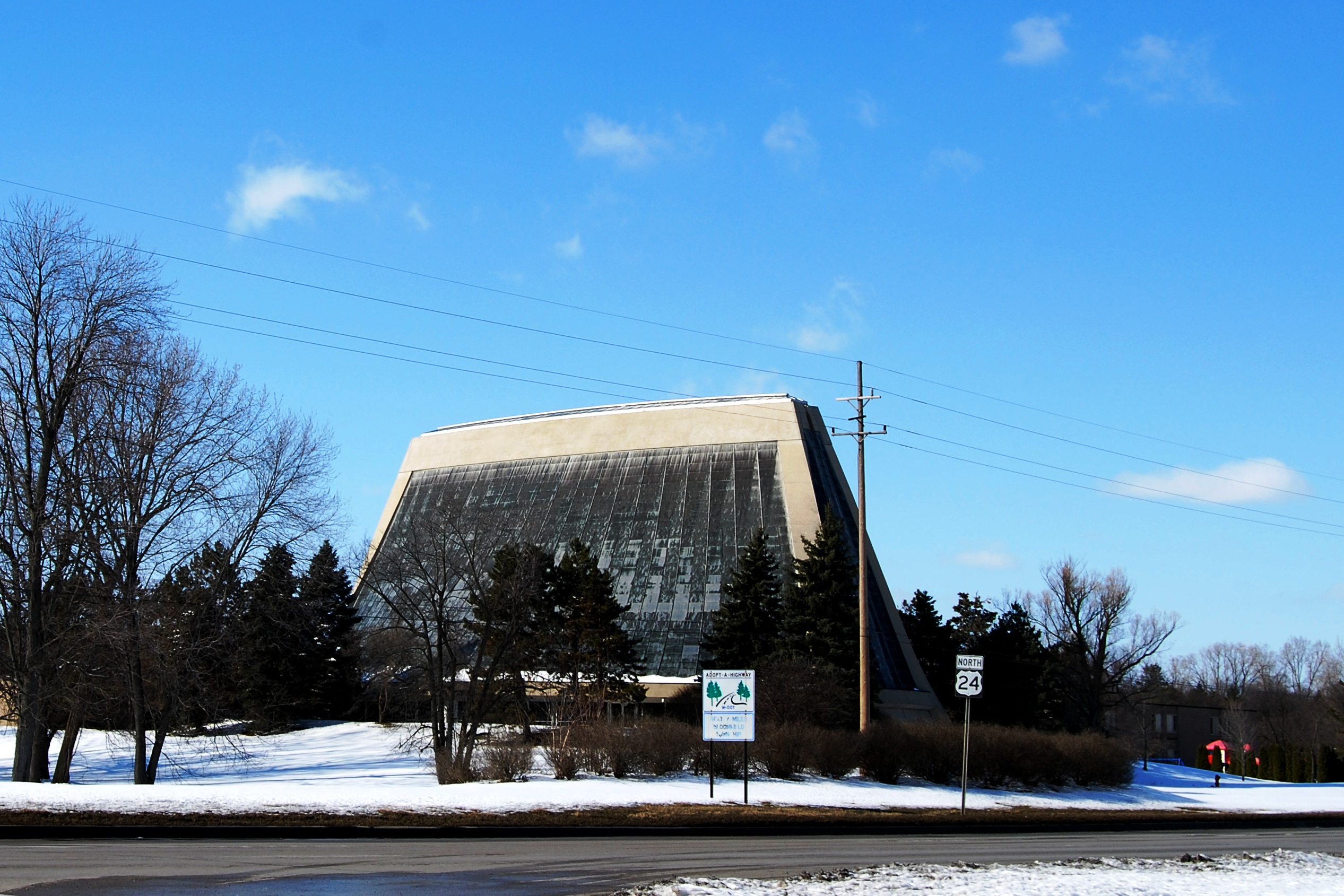
Temple Beth El in Bloomfield Township

As of 2012, about 116,000 Jewish Americans live in Metro Detroit. In 2001, about 96,000 Jewish Americans lived in Metro Detroit. That year, 75% of them lived in Oakland County. Many live within walking distance of their synagogues.

The Jewish community includes Ashkenazi, Hasidic, and Sephardic origin Jews who follow those traditions. The religious movements represented include common versions of Conservative, Orthodox, and Reform Judaism.

The nearby cities of Ann Arbor, Flint, Lansing, and Ypsilanti have their own Jewish communities. Barry Stiefel, author of The Jewish Community of Metro Detroit 1945–2005, classifies these cities as being part of the "Greater Metro Detroit" region.

== History ==
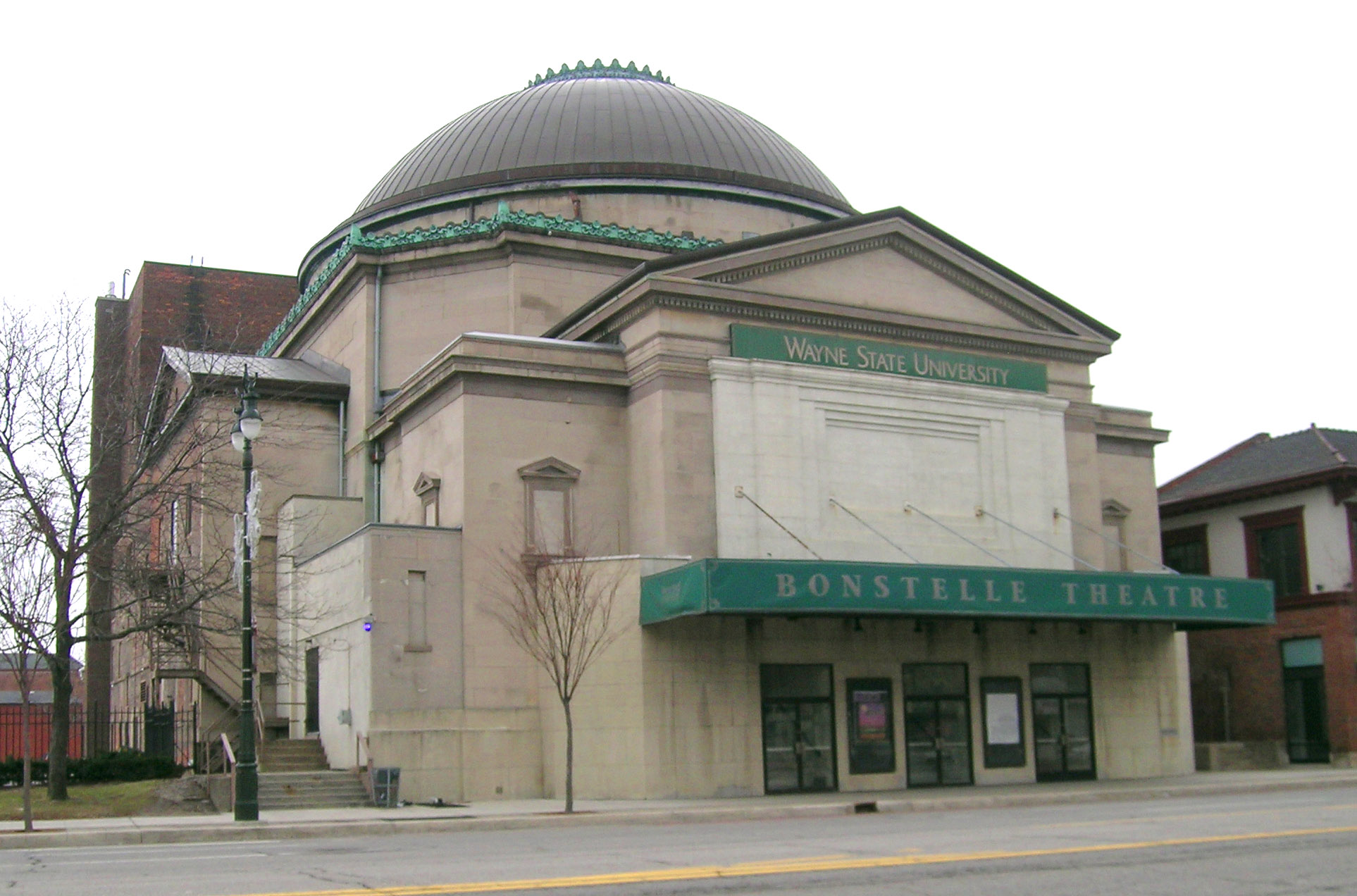
1902–1922 Temple Beth-El, now the Bonstelle Theatre

=== Early Jewish traders and settlers (1762–1830) ===
Early Jewish settlement in Detroit was limited and almost entirely transitory, consisting primarily of German-born fur traders who occasionally passed through the city. The first of these was Chapman Abraham from Montreal, who lived intermittently in Detroit between 1762 and his death in 1783. He was followed by dry goods traders Ezekiel and Levi Solomon who, though both captured by Ottawa forces during Pontiac's Rebellion, would eventually find themselves supporting opposite sides of the American Revolutionary War.

=== German arrivals (1840–1880) ===
As instability and economic hardship impacted Europe before, during, and after the Revolutions of 1848, tens of thousands of Jewish immigrants from German lands, primarily young men, arrived in the United States. Many of these immigrants, in particular those from Germany, settled in rapidly growing Midwestern cities such as Detroit. By 1856, Detroit was home to a German-language Jewish newspaper called Die Deborah.

These German Jews included Edward Kanter, who arrived sometime in the 1840s and became fluent in multiple regional Indigenous languages, including Ojibwe, as an interpreter for the American Fur Company. He would go on to found multiple banks in the city.

The first Jewish religious services held in Detroit were on September 22, 1850, in the home of Isaac Cozens. Called the Bet El Society (later changed to Temple Beth El), services were held in the style of the recently founded German-Jewish Reform movement. Their first leader, Rabbi Samuel Marcus, would die during the city's cholera epidemic in 1854.

In 1861, a doctrinal split within the community between Reform and Orthodox congregants resulted in the splitting off of the more traditional Shaarey Zedek Society from Beth El. This synagogue would eventually join the Conservative movement and become Congregation Shaarey Zedek.

As Northern industry swelled to supply the Union Army during the American Civil War, a number of these German-Jewish immigrants became economically successful, with the Sykes, Heavenrich, Butzel, and Heineman families successfully contracting their textile firms to supply uniforms for Union forces.

Both Beth El and Shaarey Zedek became the main focal points of the city's upwardly mobile and increasingly well-established German-Jewish communities, with the latter congregation commissioning the city's first purpose-built synagogue building in 1877.

=== Detroit's first Jewish neighborhood (1880–1930) ===
German and Central European Jews found their homes in the Hastings Street neighborhood around 1880. Here, the professions of the middle class included proprietors, managers, and white collar workers. Some of the elite were involved in politics including elected positions at the city and state level in the late 19th and early 20th centuries. After 1930, no Jew served on Detroit's elected Common Council until 1962.

=== Eastern European arrivals (1900–1940) ===
==== Demographics ====
Eastern European Jews arrived in Metropolitan Detroit in the 20th century. The German Jews left the Hastings Street neighborhood for the areas to the north and west of it, although such areas included east of Woodward Avenue near Warren and Oakland Avenues. In the 1930s, Jews leaving Germany under Adolf Hitler arrived in Detroit. In the 1940s, the 12th Street/Linwood/Dexter area housed the Jewish community in Detroit. The community later moved to the Livernois-Seven Mile area. It subsequently relocated to the Oakland County municipalities of Oak Park, Southfield, and West Bloomfield. The post-World War II Jewish community began to suburbanize. Barry Stiefel, author of The Jewish Community of Metro Detroit 1945–2005, wrote that "the move from Detroit to the suburbs north of Eight Mile Road was not a Jewish event, but one of socioeconomic class and race."

According to historian Lila Corwin Berman, although not as populated as the Lower East Side, Jewish Hastings Street still struck reports as overcrowded and teeming with foreignness and a "queer" Yiddish dialect." The Michigan census in 1935 stated, "10% of Jews lived in the Hastings Street area and 80% of the Jewish population lived in two neighborhoods, the Twelfth Street area and the neighborhood referred to as Dexter."

The local elementary school was the most populous in the city and had a predominantly Jewish student body. Synagogues and kosher markets lined the streets in this area of the city. The Dexter/Davison Market was where Jews came to show up and to pause in their errands for conversations and to catch up with one another.

==== Economy ====
According to Meyer, Jewish workers' incomes varied by industry. An income of $2,000 or more was received in 1934 by 33 percent of the Jewish workers who engaged in professional service, while only 5 percent of the workers in domestic and personal service industries and 6 percent of the Jewish workers in automobile factories reached that threshold. By 1935, the workforce was considered to be 34,459 people. The white collar occupation groups around that time included professional workers, proprietors, managers and officials, and clerks and kindred workers.

By 1937, 71,000 Jews lived in Detroit, which made it the sixth most populated Jewish city in the United States.

==== Prohibition Era (1920–1930) ====
In the 1920s and early 1930s, during the Prohibition Era, the Jewish Purple Gang operated alcohol smuggling and committed acts of violence in Detroit. By the early 1930s, the gang had been weakened and organized crime groups from the East Coast wrested control of the territory from the Purple Gang.

=== Tension (1936–1970) ===
==== Jewish Community Council ====
The Jewish Community Council was a centralized Jewish organization founded in 1936. The aim of the organization was to coordinate Jewish activity regarding relations with non-Jews throughout the city. In the late 1930s, the group turned its attention to the tension brewing in the Hastings Street area in the late 1930s.

==== Jewish and African American conflict ====
According to Berman, "In the fall of 1937, the rabbi of Temple Beth El, the city's largest Reform temple, chastised Jewish merchants in the Hastings street area for behaving unethically towards black customers." She also stated, "Black/Jewish conflict flared between 1938 and 1941, especially along Hastings Street where youths assaulted merchants and their stores." However, there were some African Americans who considered Jews their allies. According to Capeci, "Prominent Jewish Detroit's had supported the Urban League, genuinely but paternalistically concerned more with improving the welfare of black than raising their status." Following the Detroit race riot of 1943, Detroit Mayor Edward Jeffries decided to appoint a Jewish woman to his newly-established Inter-Racial Committee, and named Mrs. Golda Krolik, who served on this committee until 1968.

==== 1940s ====
In the 1940s, Jews in Detroit were involved in their neighborhood's policies. They were concerned with who was living where, who was moving, and why. In the fall of 1947, the Jewish Community Council joined forces with the Interracial Committee of the NAACP to create the Midtown Neighborhood Council.

==== Late 1960s and 1970s ====
In 1963 Rabbi Sherwin Wine, located in Metro Detroit, founded the Humanistic Judaism movement. In 1966, Rabbi Morris Adler of Congregation Shaarey Zedek was shot while leading a service on the bima, and later succumbed to his wounds.

=== The rise of the suburbs (1950–1958) ===
In the 1950s Jewish settlement patterns changed from the northwest suburb of Detroit into Jewish spaces. In 1958, one-fifth of all Detroit Jews lived in Oak Park and Huntington Woods. But, some left for the suburbs with a sense of defeat. According to Berman, "Most, however, expressed optimism that the suburbs would become a newer, better location for American and Jewish life than the city had been. Suburban planning commissions, driven by the building industry and federal incentives for home building in the suburbs, helped create the landscape of optimism."

=== The later suburban neighborhoods (1970–1988) ===
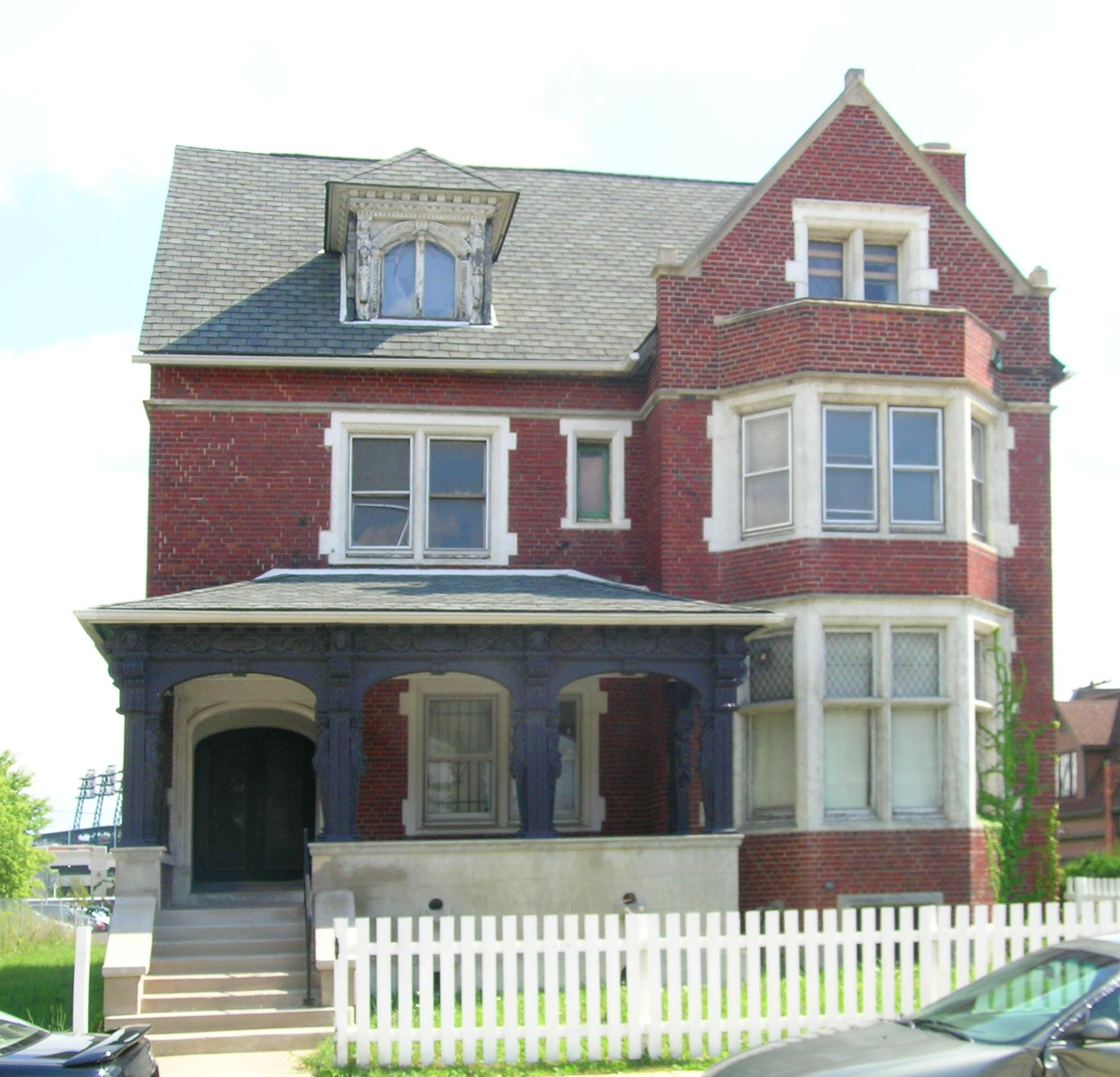
Bernard Ginsburg House

Stiefel wrote that by the 1970s the exodus of Jews from the City of Detroit to the suburbs had increased from a "trickle" to a "deluge." There were 80,000 Jews living in Metro Detroit in 1976, of a total population of 4,138,800, and in the metro area there were 34 congregations: 23 Orthodox, 6 Conservative, 4 Reform, and one Humanistic. In the 1980s the Metro Detroit Jewish community lived in several municipalities. Barry Steifel, author of The Jewish Community of Metro Detroit 1945–2005, wrote that in the 1980s "the new, collective foci of the Jewish community" were several municipalities in Oakland County and western Wayne County which housed "massive congregations". Stiefel wrote that it was by then "nonexistent" in the City of Detroit. Suburban municipalities defined by Stiefel as foci included Bloomfield Hills, Farmington Hills, Oak Park, Royal Oak, Southfield, and West Bloomfield. Smaller congregations of Jewish people existed in other municipalities such as Livonia and Trenton.

In the 1980s many Russian Jews arrived in Metro Detroit because of the Soviet Union's 1988 relaxation of travel restrictions and the processes of its dissolution. Oak Park received most of these Russian Jews. The Metro Detroit Jewish community helped thousands of these Soviet Jews travel to Michigan.

== Institutions ==
The Jewish Federation of Metropolitan Detroit is headquartered in Bloomfield Township, near Bloomfield Hills. The headquarters, the Max M. Fisher Building, was dedicated on May 3, 1992.

Jewish Community Center/JCC -West Bloomfield (World’s largest in size) -Ann Arbor -Oak Park (Closed in 2015)

Day Schools -Hillel Day School of Metropolitan Detroit, Farmington Hills -Farber Hebrew Day School (fka. Yeshivat Akiva), Southfield -Hebrew Day School of Ann Arbor, Ann Arbor -Frankel Jewish Academy (College prep.), West Bloomfield

Summer Camps -Tamarack Camps (Camp Maas), Ortonville -Tamarack Camps (Fresh Air Camp), Brighton (Closed in 1993, Ortonville is still running). -Camp Tanuga, Kewadin -Camp Sea-Gull, Charlevoix (Closed, 2012) -Camp Nehelu (Closed) -Wooden Acres Camp (2003-2016)

Delicatessens -Stage & Company, West Bloomfield & Troy -Deli Unique, West Bloomfield, Detroit, Bloomfield Hills, Novi -Plaza Deli, Southfield -Steven’s Deli, Bloomfield Hills

Bakeries & Bagel Bakeries. -Zeman's New York Bakeries, Oak Park & Southfield -Diamond Bake Shoppe, West Bloomfield -Star Bakeries, Oak Park & Southfield -Modern Bakery, Oak Park (Closed 2012)

-Chapels (Funeral) Dorfman, Ira Kaufman, Hebrew Memorial.

-Cemeteries. Adas Shalom Memorial Park, Machpelah, Beth Olem, B'nai David, Elmwood, Hebrew Memorial Park, Clover Hill, Beth El, Beth Abraham, Beth Tefilo

== Education ==
=== Primary and secondary schools ===
The Jean and Samuel Frankel Jewish Academy of Metropolitan Detroit is located in West Bloomfield.

Hillel Day School is in Farmington Hills.

The Tushiyah United Hebrew School previously operated in Detroit.

Yeshiva Beth Yehudah

Farber Hebrew Day School-Yeshivat Akiva

Yeshivas Darchei Torah

=== Colleges and universities ===
Michigan Jewish Institute (closed since 2016) had its U.S. administrative office in Southfield and its primary campus in West Bloomfield Township.

== Religion ==
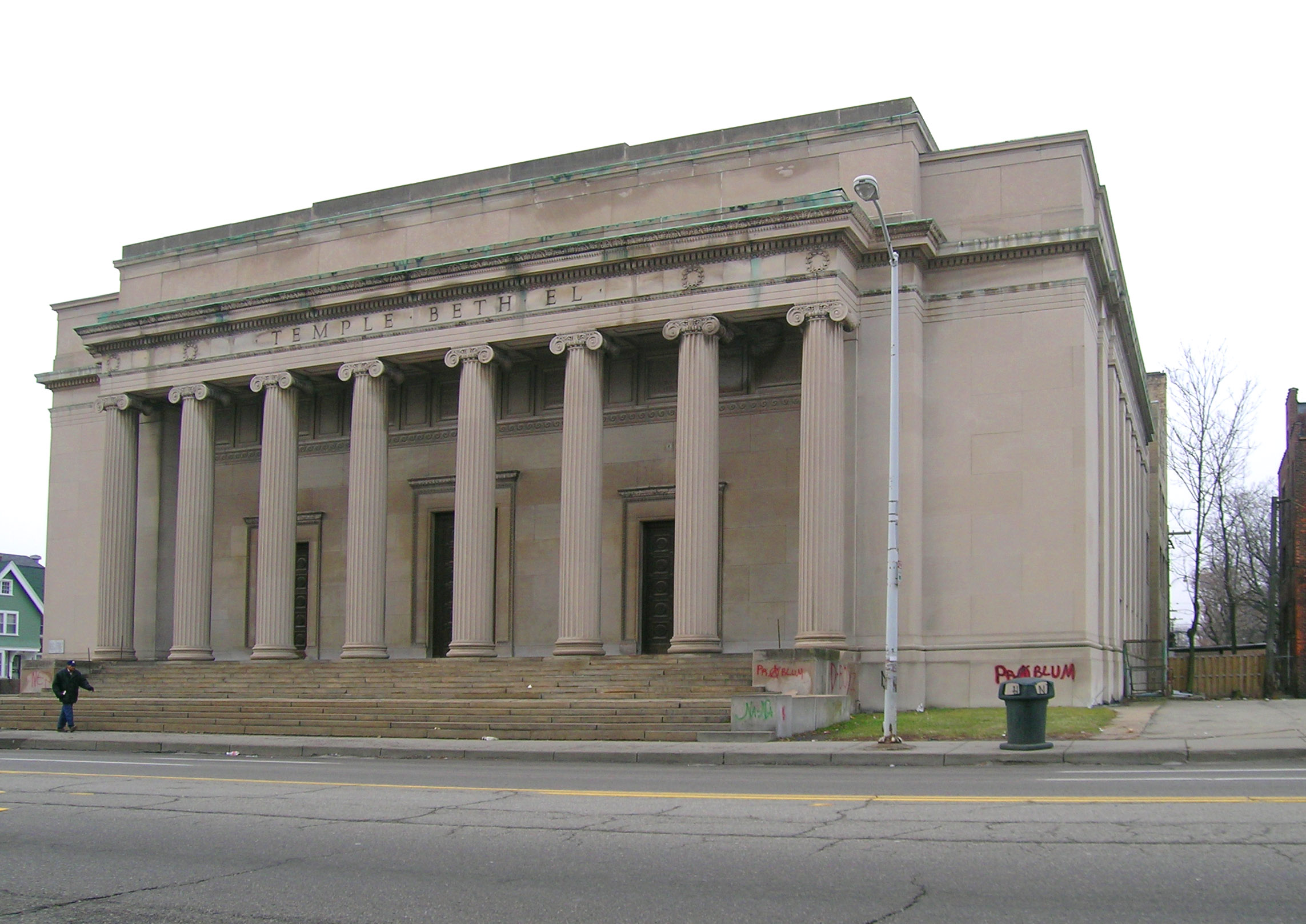
1922–1973 temple of Temple Beth El in Detroit

In the early 20th Century Jews of many nationalities had settled Detroit. The German Jews, who predominately lived north of Downtown Detroit, usually worshiped at Reform Temple Beth El. Russian and Eastern European Jews tended to worship at lower east side Jewish district Orthodox synagogues.

In Delray the First Hebrew Congregation of Delray or the Orthodox Hungarian Jewish Congregation was located on Burdeno, near Fort Wayne. It was operated by Hungarian Jews and it was Detroit's first Orthodox Judaism synagogue that was west of Woodward Avenue.

== Media ==
The Detroit Jewish News serves the Jewish community in Metro Detroit.

In 1951 there were Jewish community newspapers in Detroit in the English and Yiddish languages. Two English-language newspapers, The Jewish News and the Jewish Chronicle, were weekly. There were Detroit editions of The Jewish Daily Forward and one other paper, two daily Yiddish papers.

== Notable people ==
- Steve Ballmer
- Elizabeth Berkley
- Richard H. Bernstein
- Selma Blair
- Jerry Bruckheimer
- William Davidson
- Doug Fieger
- Geoffrey Fieger
- Max Fisher
- Dan Gilbert
- Lee Gordon
- David Hermelin
- Dana Jacobson
- Albert Kahn (architect)
- Aaron Krickstein
- Eric Lefkofsky
- Carl Levin
- Sander Levin
- Gilda Radner
- Debbie Schlussel
- A. Alfred Taubman
- Gary Torgow
- Don Was
- Sherwin Wine
- Gary Yourofsky

== See also ==
- Demographics of Metro Detroit
- Isaac Agree Downtown Synagogue
- Bonstelle Theatre (former Temple Beth-El)
- History of the Middle Eastern people in Metro Detroit
- History of the Indian Americans in Metro Detroit
- Interfaith Leadership Council of Metropolitan Detroit
