= Michigan Jewish Institute =

Educational institute

Coordinates: 42°32′34.3″N 83°24′50.0″W

- MJI
- Type: Private
- Active: 1994–2016
- Affiliations: Jewish
- Location: West Bloomfield, Michigan, United States
- Campus: Multiple campuses: West Bloomfield, Oak Park, and Online
- Website: www.mjiedu.com/

Michigan Jewish Institute (MJI) was a Jewish-sponsored independent institution of higher and professional education in the Metro Detroit, Michigan area. Its administrative office was in Southfield, Michigan, and its primary campus was West Bloomfield Township. The institute was located at the 45-acre Campus of Living Judaism, affiliated with the Chabad-Lubavitch movement.

In March 2016, the U.S. Department of Education denied its recertification of the school, no longer allowing it to access federal financial aid. The institute immediately suspended the majority of its operations.

== See also ==
- History of the Jews in Metro Detroit
