= Golda Krolik =

Detroit activist and organizer

Golda Ginsburg Krolik
- Born: Golda Ginsburg; August 24, 1892
- Died: May 1, 1985 (aged 92)
- Education: University of Michigan
- Organizations: United Jewish Charities Campaign; Detroit Community Fund; Resettlement Service; Detroit Commission on Community Relations
- Spouses: Leopold Mayer; Julian Krolik
- Children: 4
- Awards: Fred M. Butzel Award from the Detroit Jewish Welfare Federation; honorary director, Detroit NAACP; Amity Award, American Jewish Congress

Golda Ginsburg Krolik (August 24, 1892 - May 1, 1985) was a Detroit activist and organizer. The daughter of Detroit civic leaders Bernard and Ida Ginsberg, she was the first woman reporter for the Michigan Daily, an editor of The Detroit Jewish Chronicle, and an early employee of the Detroit United Jewish Charities. With her husband, she helped many relatives to come to the United States as European refugees, and became the second president of Detroit's Resettlement Service. Following the Detroit race riot of 1943, Detroit Mayor Edward Jeffries established an Inter-Racial Committee, and appointed her to this committee as a representative of the Jewish community. She served on this committee until 1968. As part of her work to reduce racial discrimination in Detroit, she raised funds for a counselor to assist black nursing students, helping to increase the number of black nurses in Detroit from 6 to 1,000.
