= Murder of Morris Adler =

Murder-suicide involving prominent Michigan rabbi in 1966

- Location: Congregation Shaarey Zedek, Southfield, Michigan, U.S.
- Date: February 12, 1966; 11:40am
- Attack type: Shooting, murder-suicide
- Weapon: Colt .32 revolver
- Deaths: 2 (including the perpetrator)
- Victim: Morris Adler
- Perpetrator: Richard Wishnetsky
- Motive: Mental illness; religious dispute

On February 12, 1966, Richard Wishnetsky entered Congregation Shaarey Zedek in Southfield, Michigan, during weekly Shabbat services and, brandishing a firearm, ordered everyone except Rabbi Morris Adler off the synagogue's bimah. After condemning the congregation, Wishnetsky shot Adler and himself.

The incident was witnessed by the entire congregation. Due to Adler's stature as one of the most influential leaders of the American Jewish community following World War II, the incident was highly publicized and reported internationally.

== Morris Adler ==
Rabbi Morris Adler

Personal life
- Born: March 30, 1906 Slutsk, Belarus, Russian Empire
- Died: March 11, 1966 (aged 59) Southfield, Michigan, USA
- Cause of death: Gunshot wound
- Resting place: Clover Hill Park Cemetery, Birmingham, Michigan
- Spouse: Goldie Adler (1929–1966, his death)

Religious life
- Religion: Judaism
- Denomination: Conservative Judaism
- School: Jewish Theological Seminary of America

Military service
- Service/branch: United States Army
- Years&nsbp;of&nsbp;service: 1943–1945
- Rank: Chaplain
- Unit: 11th Airborne Division Chaplain Corps

=== Early life and education ===
Adler was born to parents Joseph and Jenny Adler in the town of Slutsk, Belarus, in the Russian Empire in 1906. Joseph was a rabbi, and in 1913, the family left Russia for the United States. Settling in New York City, Adler attended DeWitt Clinton High School. He met his future wife, Goldie Kadish, at the age of 18 in 1924.

After graduating high school, Adler attended City College of New York and Yeshiva University simultaneously, graduating from the former in 1928 with concentrations in psychology, philosophy, and English. He married Goldie Kadish a year later, on June 12, 1929.

=== Early career ===
Adler's father, also a rabbi, became ill in 1929, resulting in the younger man taking over at the New York congregation. Following this experience, Adler became the rabbi of a small Orthodox congregation in St. Joseph, Missouri.

After a year in Missouri, Adler decided to become officially ordained as a Conservative rabbi, enrolling at Manhattan's Jewish Theological Seminary in 1931.

Adler graduated in 1935 and was almost immediately hired as the rabbi at the Reform Jewish Temple Emanu-El in Buffalo, New York. Three years later, in 1938, he was hired as an assistant rabbi by Congregation Shaarey Zedek in Detroit, Michigan. That year was also marked by tragedy for Adler when his father drowned while swimming at Rockaway Beach, Queens.

Swiftly, Adler made a name for himself as a respected member of the community in Detroit. As a younger counterpart to Shaarey Zedek's older, more traditional senior rabbi, Adler negotiated the ongoing transformations in American Jewish life of assimilation, acculturation, and transition from Orthodox to Conservative practice.

Adler became well-liked and was heavily involved in many cultural, religious, and political causes in the Detroit community. In 1942, he participated in the creation of the Detroit Yiddish Theater Guild, which was an attempt to communally subsidize the city's failing Yiddish theater.

=== Military service ===
Adler enlisted in the United States Army as a chaplain in 1943. Initially, he was stationed at the Rhodes General Hospital in Utica, New York, where he served patients, doctors, and their families. He was then transferred to the Pacific theater with the 11th Airborne Division, where he led services in the Philippines, Japan, and Australia.

After the end of the war, Adler visited Hiroshima and was deeply affected by what he saw, later saying, "I felt myself in the presence of a fury and a doom which filled me with foreboding and fear. I know what one of the great scientists meant when he said, 'I am a frightened man.'" Adler returned home with an "uncompromising hatred of war," writing that:

I mean a determined, impassioned fury, a deep, implacable hatred. Never again must we permit it to be pictured in romantic or glamorous fashion. We should give the lie to every poet who casts a halo of beauty over its grime and blood, and nail to the pillar of shame every pseudophilosopher who extols its virtue . . . There is nothing beautiful in destruction, nothing heroic in a man crouching behind a gun whose mouth spouts death, or in a flyer dropping ruin from the skies. Foxholes, sinking ships, disfigured bodies, gaping wounds, burning cities are the epitome of cruelty and ugliness.

=== Congregation Shaarey Zedek ===
After his return to civilian life in 1945 and elevation to the position of chief rabbi in 1946, Adler increased his involvement in social causes. These included ethical use of nuclear power and support for the burgeoning Civil Rights movement. In 1947, he published a collected volume titled Selected Passages of the Torah.

In 1954, he was elected to the position of chief rabbi for life by his congregation. An ardent Zionist, he took this opportunity to spend a sabbatical year in Israel before returning to the Jewish Theological Seminary to teach.

A prolific writer and activist, Adler served as chairman of the Law Committee of the Rabbinical Assembly, making halachic judgements to aid Jews in adapting traditional law to modern life. In 1958, he published The World of the Talmud. In 1957, he became chairman of the United Auto Workers Public Review Board. He was involved in at least fifteen additional religious, secular, political, and governmental boards, federations, and charities during the remainder of his life and received an honorary doctorate in law from Wayne State University in 1960.

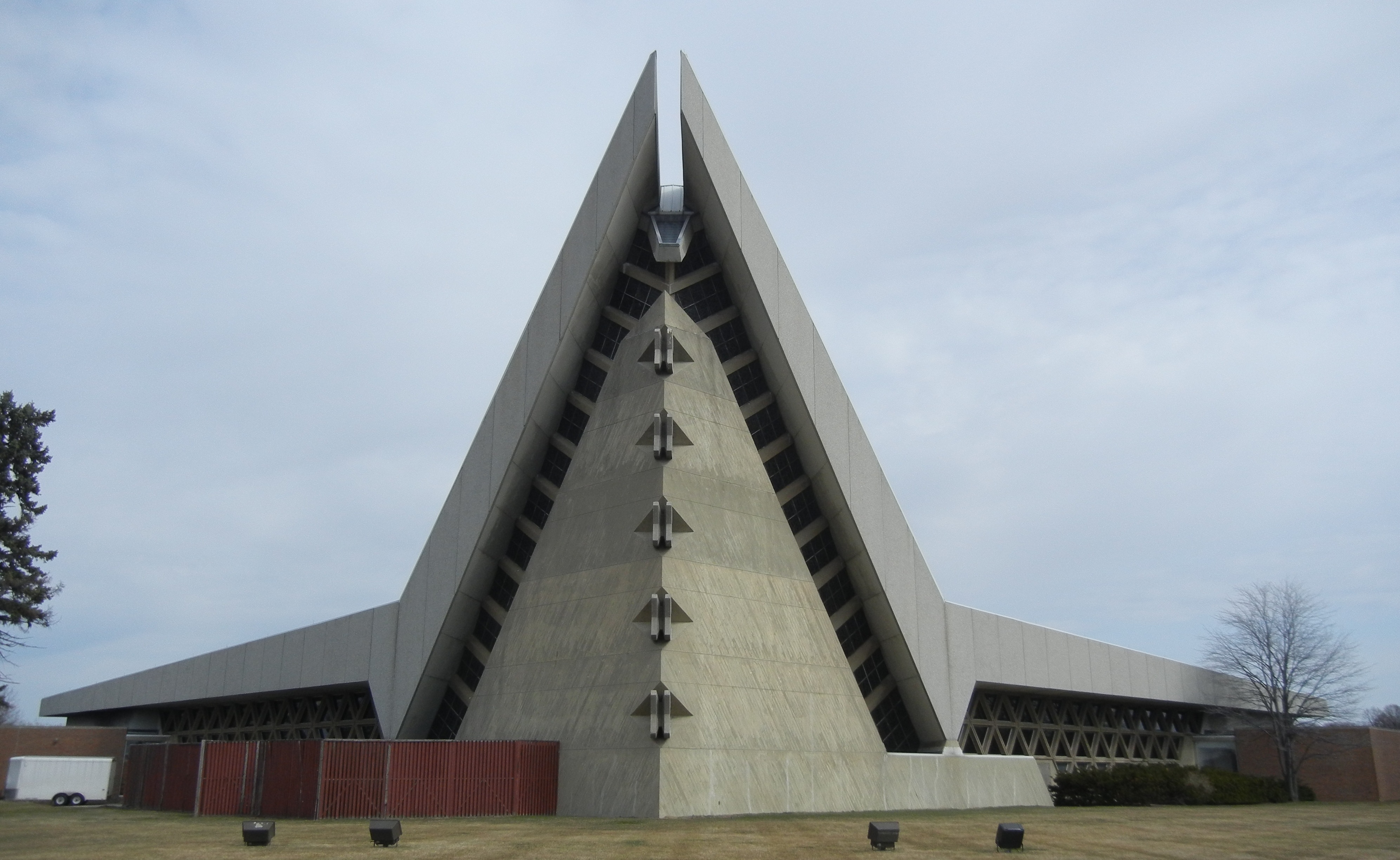
Congregation Shaarey Zedek's modernist building in Southfield, Michigan. Erected 1961, designed by Percival Goodman.

Adler supervised the congregation's move from the city of Detroit to suburban Southfield in 1961, to a new building in the brutalist style designed by architect Percival Goodman.

== Richard Wishnetsky ==
=== Early life ===
Richard S. Wishnetsky was born in 1942 in the Bronx, New York, where he attended a Yiddish-language Workmen's Circle school. At the age of eleven in 1953, his family moved to a predominantly Jewish neighborhood in Northwest Detroit. While attending Mumford High School, Wishnetsky was known as an intelligent and bright student, and was involved in numerous Jewish youth movements including B'nai Brith Youth Organization, United Synagogue Youth, and Farband.

=== Relationship with Adler ===
During his senior year of high school, Wishnetsky began attending Rabbi Adler's weekly lectures for young people, where he developed a rapport with Adler. After a hiatus during Wishnetsky's undergraduate studies at the University of Michigan, he and Adler had regular conversations and counseling sessions during Wishnetsky's graduate studies in Philosophy at the University of Detroit Mercy.

Though he idealized the rabbi, Wishnetsky was known by friends and community members to be critical of the congregation and of Adler, referring to it as "opulent" and "bourgeois," and saying that Adler was "using his brilliance as a force for evil." In particular, Wishnetsky levied criticism against the synagogue's 1962 relocation to suburban Southfield, viewing it as a manifestation of white flight from historically Jewish neighborhoods in Detroit which were becoming increasingly African-American.

=== Mental deterioration ===
Though Wishnetsky was known to be eccentric and highly intellectual, in the winter of 1965 he began exhibiting erratic, manic behavior, eliciting concern from classmates and friends. He spoke often of suicide. Joyce Carol Oates, who was at the time an assistant professor of English at the University of Detroit and an acquaintance of Wishnetsky's, said later:

"It was all there on that first day – the latent violence, the scornful refutations, the sense that the majority of people are somehow wrong and therefore contemptible. . . . He told me . . . that if God did not exist, life was not worth living and he would commit suicide."

Wishnetsky was taken to Detroit General Hospital, then to the Herman Kiefer Psychiatric Hospital, for medical and psychiatric observation on July 27, 1965, where he was determined to be a possible danger to himself and others. Soon after he was transferred to a private psychiatric care facility in Rochester, Michigan, from which he attempted unsuccessfully to escape multiple times. In August, he was transferred yet again to the Ypsilanti State Hospital, where he was diagnosed with borderline schizophrenia, suicidal, and homicidal tendencies.

In September, Wishnetsky escaped from the hospital, but by the end of the month was granted freedom on the condition that he see a psychiatrist regularly. He enrolled at Wayne State University, but his mental state continued to deteriorate, resulting in him being banned from the campus of University of Detroit.

By January, Wishnetsky had begun speaking openly of violent fantasies such as kidnapping the governor of Michigan, George W. Romney, or committing suicide at Shaarey Zedek in front of the congregation. In early February, he penned a six-page polemic titled "Fantasy Regarding an Assassination of Robert S. McNamara," framed as an apology for a hypothetical assassination of the then-Secretary of Defense for his role in the ongoing Vietnam War. On February 3, Wishnetsky traveled to Ohio and purchased a Colt revolver.

== Events of February 12 ==
At approximately 11:40am on Saturday, February 12, 1966, Wishnetsky entered the sanctuary of Congregation Shaarey Zedek, where Rabbi Adler was leading Saturday morning Shabbat services during the Bar Mitzvah ceremony of one Steven Frank. Adler had just finished delivering a sermon regarding the Assassination of Abraham Lincoln, on the occasion of Lincoln's birthday. Wishnetsky's parents were in attendance.

Approaching the rabbi, Wishnetsky raised his revolver and said "I have a statement to make. Everybody off the bimah except Rabbi Adler," then fired once into the ceiling.

Wishnetsky took to the bimah, where he spoke again, reading aloud from a prepared speech: "This congregation is a travesty and an abomination. It has made a mockery by its phoniness and hypocrisy of the beauty and spirit of Judaism. With this act I protest a humanly horrifying and hence unacceptable situation." He turned to Adler and shot him twice, in the forearm and head. Wishnetsky then turned the gun on himself.

Although Adler initially remained conscious, the first bullet had ricocheted off his arm and lodged inside his head. Both he and Wishnetsky, still alive, were taken to nearby Providence Hospital.

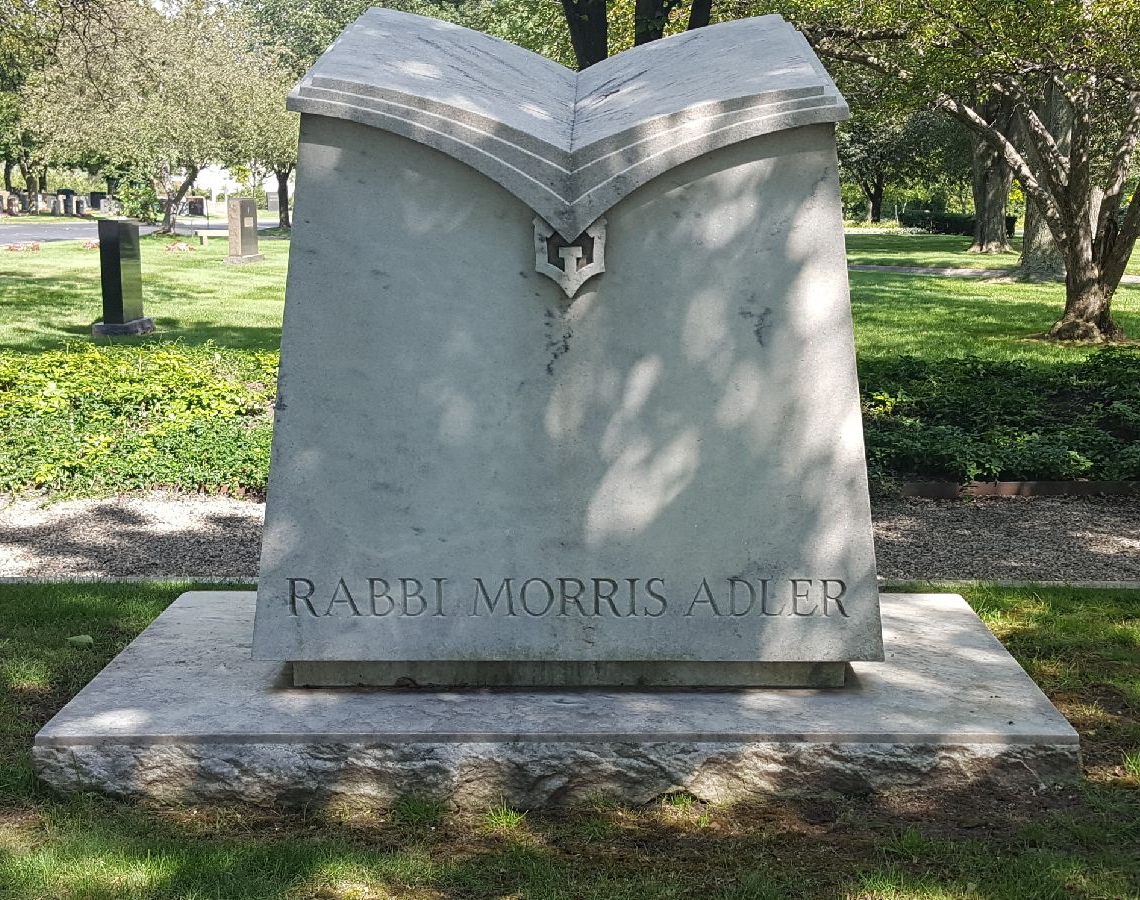
Rabbi Morris Adler's grave monument at Clover Hill Park Cemetery in Birmingham, Michigan.

Wishnetsky died four days later on February 16. Adler remained in a coma for nearly a month before dying on the morning of March 11. Both men were buried in the congregation's cemetery in Birmingham, Michigan. Between 6,000 and 20,000 people attended Adler's funeral, and his death was reported in newspapers around the world.

== Historiography ==
(See also: History of the Jews in Metro Detroit)

Holocaust survivor Elie Wiesel was among those who attempted to make sense of Adler's murder, comparing the incident to the assassination of John F. Kennedy and writing that "the Jews of Detroit have been walking as if in a nightmare. They do not understand. . . . They ask: how did it happen? Why? They have no answer." He argued that Wishnetsky's act "[came] not from an indifference to meaning, but from a desperate search for meaning."

Historian Lila Corwin Berman, in her book Metropolitan Jews: Politics, Race, and Religion in Postwar Detroit, situated the murder of Rabbi Adler, and the concerns which Wishnetsky expressed in his condemnation of the congregation, within greater societal shifts of the mid-to-late 1960s including suburbanization, youth alienation, and concerns within the Jewish community about assimilation:

"Wishnetsky intoned a prophecy of suburban ruin, not so different from social critics' vilification of the suburbs as breeding grounds of materialism, conformism, and vacuity. Unlike social critics, however, he used firepower to enact the prophecy and to stain the multimillion-dollar monumental synagogue with the blood of its rabbi and its disenchanted youth."

Historian of Jewish Detroit Sidney Bolkosky saw Adler's murder as one of a number of near-simultaneous crises, namely the Six-Day War and 1967 Detroit riot, that impacted the Detroit Jewish community in 1966-67, thus compounding the traumatic impact of the incident.

== Legacy ==
Morris Adler Elementary School in Southfield is named for Adler, as is a section of the M-10 freeway which passes in front of Shaarey Zedek.

The non-fiction book Murder in the Synagogue by T.V. LoCicero was published in 1970, detailing the lives of Adler and Wishnetsky and the lead-up to the assassination. Detroit author Adele Mondry included two short stories about Adler and Wishnetsky in her Yiddish-language short story collection Wyszkovo: A Shtetl on the Bug River, published in English in 1980.

In 2016, The Detroit Jewish News published a retrospective on Rabbi Adler on the 50th anniversary of his death.
