= Tushiyah United Hebrew School – Scott Memorial Methodist Episcopal Church =

- U.S. National Register of Historic Places
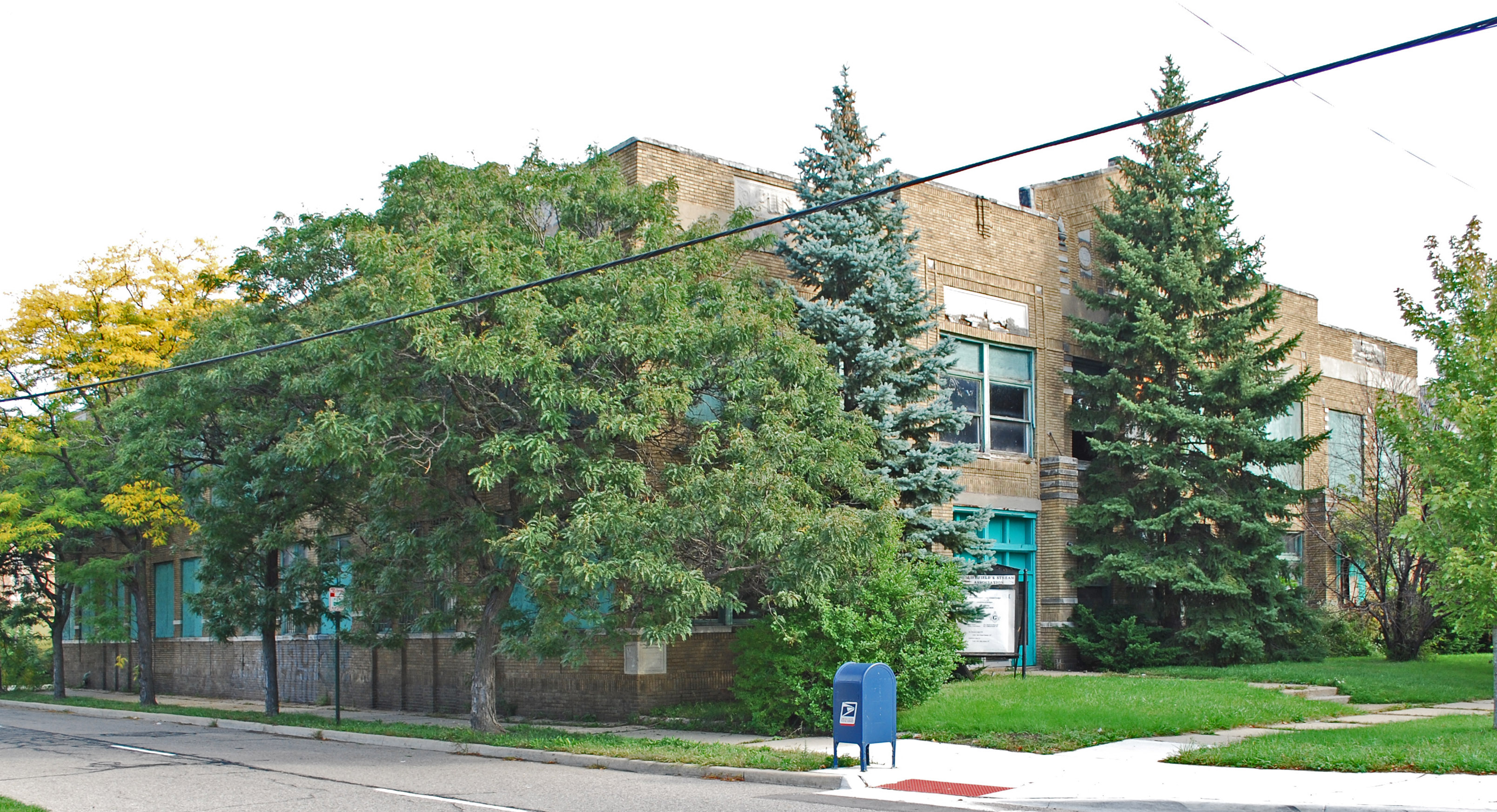
- Building before restoration as the Kirby Center Lofts
- Interactive map
- Location: 609 East Kirby Street; Detroit, Michigan
- Coordinates: 42°21′48″N 83°3′32″W
- Built: 1922
- Architect: Isadore M. Lewis
- NRHP reference No.: 11000616
- Added to NRHP: September 6, 2011

Kirby Center Lofts, formerly the Tushiyah United Hebrew School, later known as the Scott Memorial Methodist Episcopal Church, is a former educational building located at 609 East Kirby Street in Detroit, Michigan. This building, an important work of architect Isadore M. Lewis, was constructed as the Tushiyah United Hebrew School and served as the headquarters of the United Hebrew Schools of Detroit. It later served as the Scott Memorial Methodist Episcopal Church, the first mainline African-American Methodist Episcopal church in Detroit. It was listed on the National Register of Historic Places in 2011.

The building now houses the Kirby Center Lofts.

== Tushiyah United Hebrew School ==
In the early 1920s, the number of people of Detroit increased dramatically, and with it, the city's Jewish population also grew. The new wave of Jewish arrivals, particularly those emigrating from Eastern Europe, spread north along what was then the Hastings Street corridor (the current location of I-75). Between 1919 and 1924, the new population built a series of Talmud Torah schools, which emphasized community-based education. The locations of these schools spread northward along Hastings Street, following the Jewish population.

The Tushiyah United Hebrew School, built in 1922 on Kirby and St. Antoine, was one of these schools. Also known as the Kirby Center, it was constructed as the headquarters of the United Hebrew Schools. The building contained classrooms for 1500 students and an auditorium for 2000 people. It served not only as a school for children, but also hosted adult education classes and community group functions.

The school was designed by Isadore M. Lewis, a Jewish architect who designed a wide array of commercial, industrial, and residential buildings, primarily for Jewish clients. Lewis was born in Appleton, Wisconsin in 1888, and in 1916 moved to Detroit to open his own architectural firm. He practiced in Detroit until at least 1960, and died in 1968.

As the 1920s wound down, the Jewish population began shifting northward and westward away from the Tushiyah United Hebrew School, building homes and schools in the Dexter-Davidson neighborhood. New African-American residents began moving into the Hastings Street neighborhood as the earlier Jewish residents moved out. The shift in population, combined with the decline in popularity of the Talmud Torah schools, lead to the closure of the Tushiyah United Hebrew School in 1929.

== Scott Memorial Methodist Episcopal Church ==
In 1929, after the closure of the school, the building was sold to the Scott Memorial Methodist Episcopal Church. The Scott Memorial ME church was founded in 1909; it was the first African-American Methodist Episcopal congregation in the city. The congregation started small, meeting in homes and storefronts and sharing a pastor with a congregation in Toledo, Ohio. In 1914, the church constructed its first building. The congregation continued to grow, and by 1924, Scott was planning on the construction of a second building. The church instead purchased the Tushiyah United Hebrew School in 1929, presumably because the cost, $92,500, was less than that for a new building.

The congregation worked hard to retire the mortgage, and by 1943, the building was paid off. This freed funding for building improvements, and the congregation put in new pews and a new roof in 1943, and remodeled part of the first floor into a youth center in 1948.

Scott Memorial was instrumental in the eventual unification of the white and African-American Methodist Episcopal churches. In 1957, Scott Memorial co-hosted an inter-racial leadership conference with the white Detroit Metropolitan Methodist Church, featuring an address by Thurgood Marshall, then an attorney for the NAACP.

However, the Scott Memorial ME church continued to grow, with over 2000 members in the mid-1960s. In 1968, the congregation began once more to look for a larger building. In 1970, the predominantly white Grace United Methodist Church merged with another congregation and offered their building, located on West Boston, to Scott Memorial for $1.00. Scott Memorial accepted the offer, and moved from the Kirby building.

In 1984, Scott Memorial sold the Kirby building to the Wild Life Field and Stream Club. In 1997, the building was sold again to the Most Worshipful Unity Grand Lodge of Michigan, Ancient and Accepted Masons. This organization owned the building as of 2011, but planned to sell it to a developer for conversion into apartments. The building was sold, and conversion into loft space was underway by 2015. Renovation was completed in 2016, and as of 2018, the building housed 3 two-bedroom, 21 one-bedroom and 2 studio apartments.

== Description ==
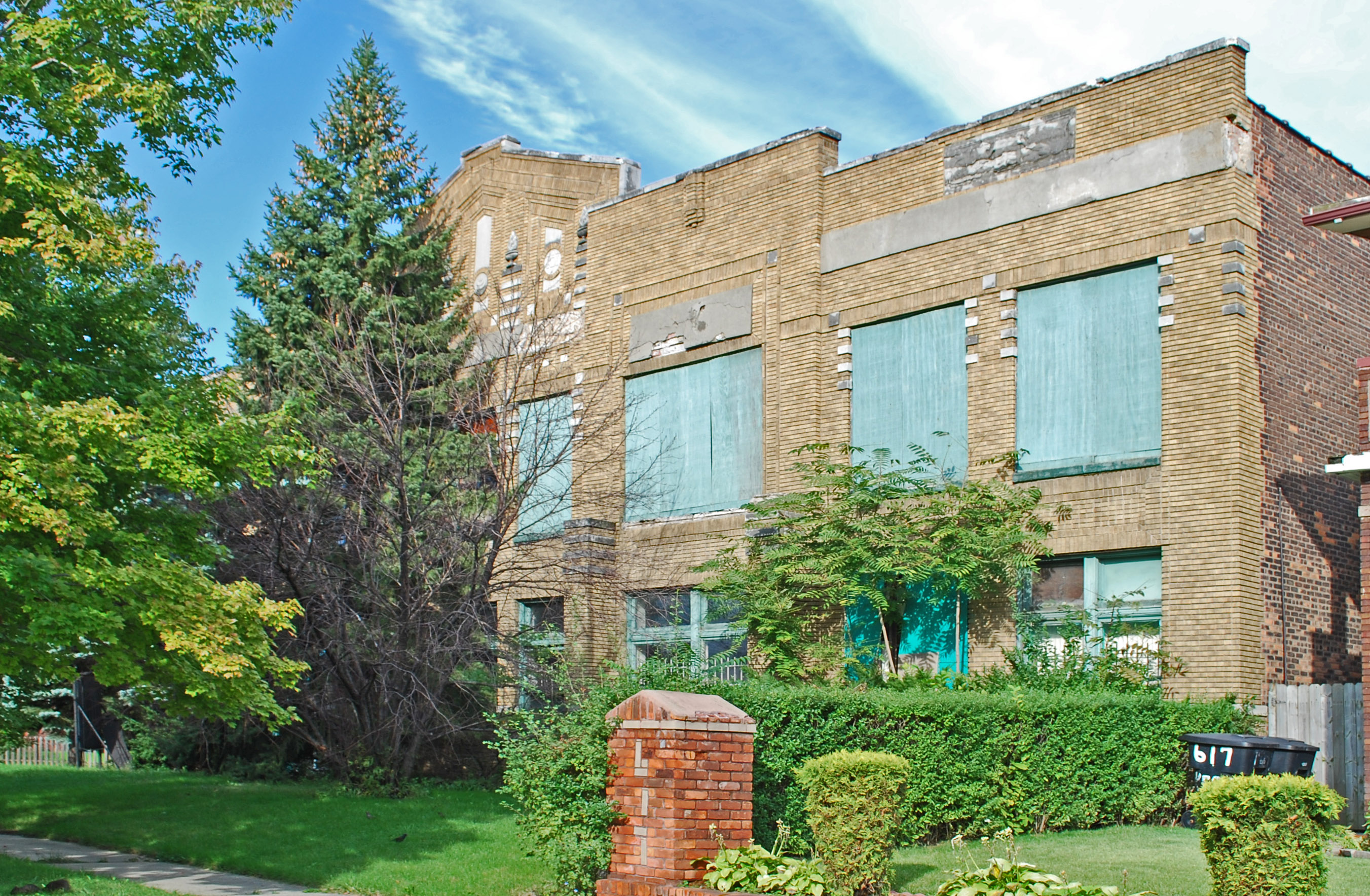

The Tushiyah United Hebrew School – Scott Memorial Methodist Episcopal Church is a two-story commercial-style building with a concrete foundation, masonry walls, and steel framing. The building is clad with tan brick, and features decorative brickwork with cast stone trim, medallions, and reliefs.

The original building was constructed in an L-shape, 102 feet by 134 feet. An arched roof, obscured by the parapet walls, covers the main section while the east–west section of the building has a flat roof. A single-story addition of concrete block and brick was built in 1950 across the rear, making a C-shape.

The front facade, facing Kirby Street, has five bays. The center bay has four piers with limestone bands and an urn at the top. Each floor has a pair of one-over-one double-hung windows with transoms. The bay to the left of the center contains the entrance, with two aluminum and glass doors. Two one-over-one double-hung windows with transoms hang on the second floor, surmounted by a weathered plaque reading "Tushiyah United Hebrew Schools of Detroit." The parapet wall has a brick relief in the center. The bay to the right of the center is identical to the entrance bay, but with two one-over-one double-hung windows with transoms on the first floor in place of the entrance doors. The two end bays have two pairs of one-over-one double-hung windows with transoms on each floor. A classical metal cornice once ran the width of the facade, but has been removed.

The side facade facing St. Antoine also has five bays: a wide center bay with five pairs of one-over-one double-hung windows with transoms, two flanking bays with three pairs of one-over-one double-hung windows with transoms, and two end bays with two pairs of one-over-one double-hung windows with transoms. Brick piers with limestone banding separate the windows. The elevations that do not face the street are red brick with limestone sills, pierced by similar one-over-one double-hung windows.

Inside the building, the main entrance has a white tile floor containing green tiles spelling, "Kirby Center" and green-and-yellow tile wainscoting. The interior hallways have terrazzo floors, plaster walls, and acoustic ceiling tile. Classrooms open onto the hall through wood-and-glass doors with transoms; many rooms retain the original wood floors, wood trim, and plaster walls. A dining hall on the first floor is not original. An auditorium and associated coat room, bar area, and restrooms are on the second floor.

== See also ==
- History of the Jews in Metro Detroit
