= Bernard Ginsburg House =

Historic house in Michigan, United States

- U.S. National Register of Historic Places
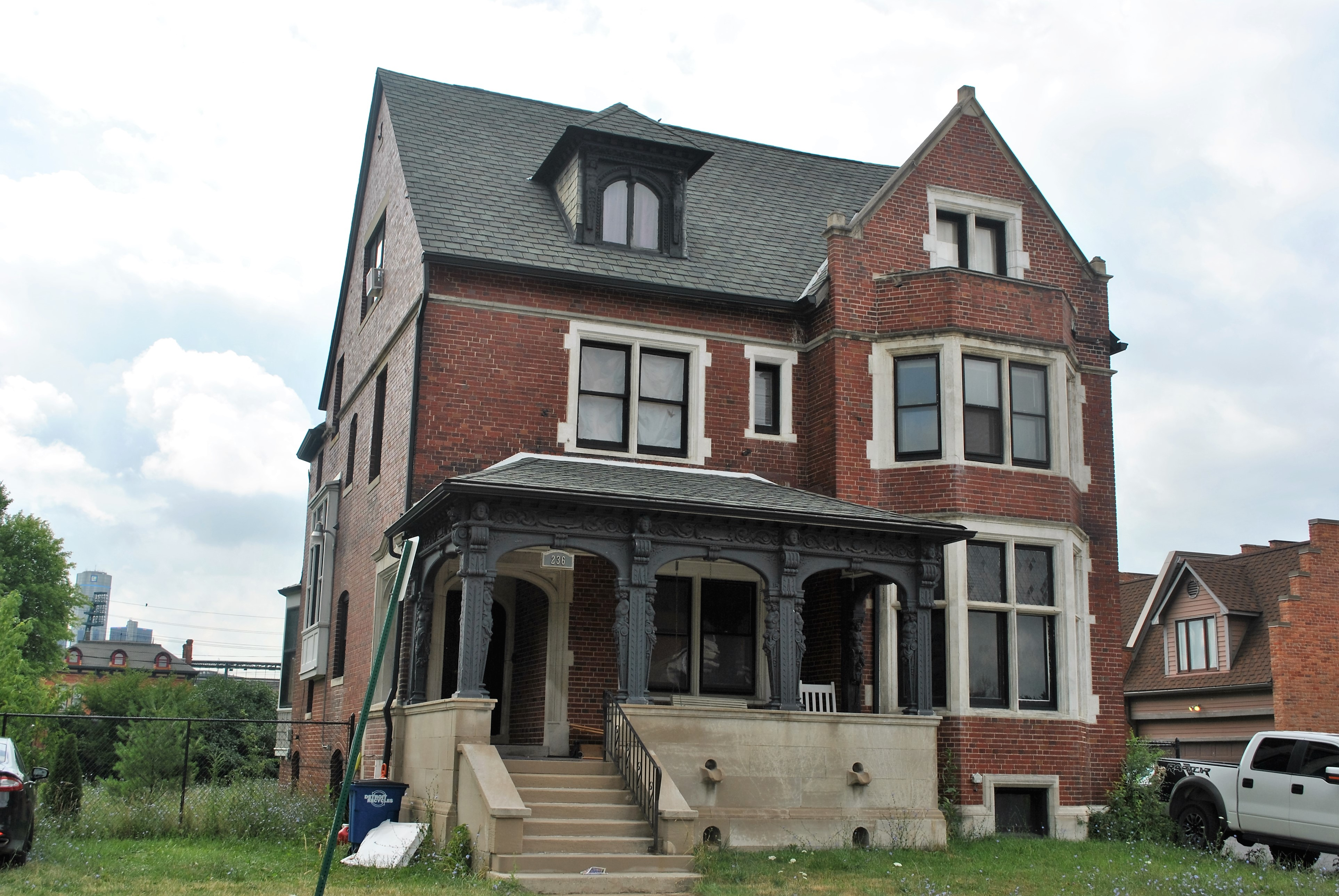

- Location within Michigan Location within the United States
- Interactive map
- Location: 236 Adelaide Street; Detroit, Michigan
- Coordinates: 42°20′34″N 83°3′5″W
- Built: 1898
- Architect: George W. Nettleton & Albert Kahn
- Architectural style: Tudor Revival
- NRHP reference No.: 91001015
- Added to NRHP: August 19, 1991

The Bernard Ginsburg House is a single-family private residence located in Midtown Detroit, Michigan, within the Brush Park district. It was listed on the National Register of Historic Places in 1991.

== Significance ==
The Bernard Ginsburg House is significant for both the original owner and the architect. Owner Bernard Ginsburg was an important figure in philanthropy, civic service, and the Jewish community in Detroit during the late 19th and early 20th century. Architect Albert Kahn went on to become well known in industrial and commercial architecture; the Ginsburg house and its English Renaissance style exhibited is typical of Kahn's early work.

== Bernard Ginsburg ==
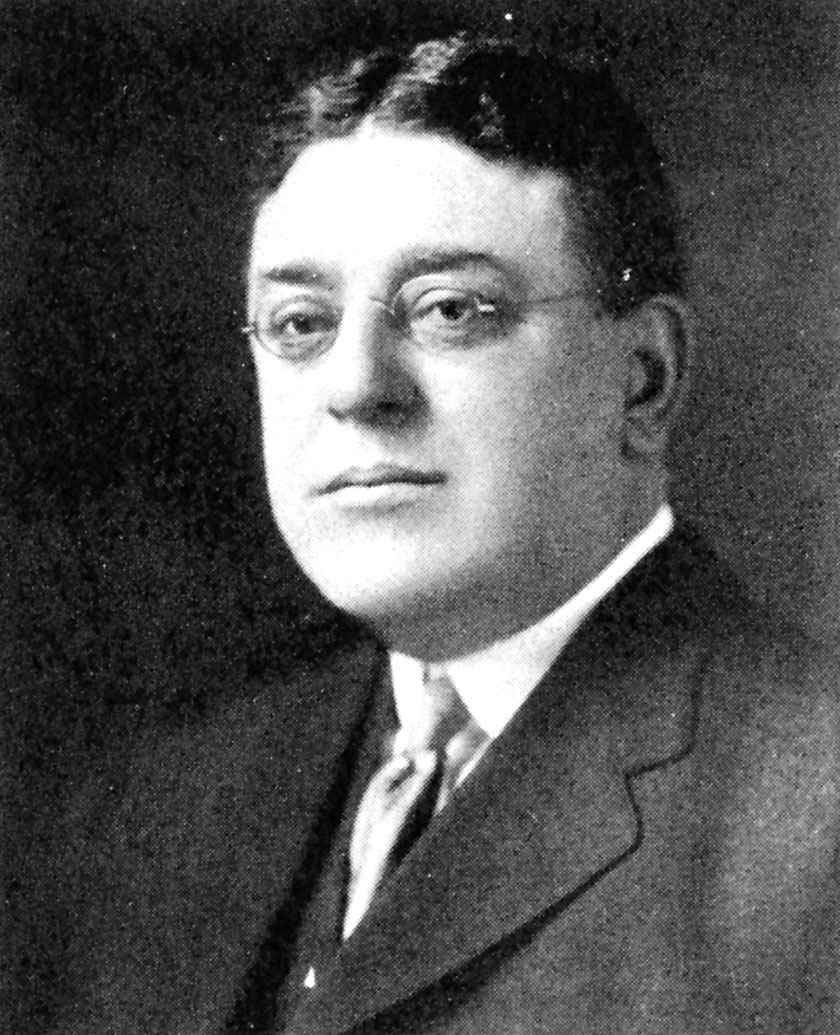
Bernard Ginsburg, c. 1919

Bernard Ginsburg was born in Columbus, Indiana, in 1864; his parents were Polish immigrants who had arrived in America in the mid-1850s. The family moved to New York and then to Detroit, where Bernard graduated from high school in 1881. Than same year, Bernard and his father began in business as iron merchants under the name, "R. L. Ginsburg". The business was successful, and Bernard became very well-to-do. He served as Public lighting Commissioner for two years and as a member of the Public Library Board. He was active in Jewish charities, particularly supporting the Eastern European Jews who were migrating into the country. He served as President of the United Jewish Charities, vice president of the National Conference of Jewish Charities, director of the Jewish Orphan Asylum in Cleveland, Ohio, and President of Temple Beth El from 1918 to 1919.

== Description ==
The Bernard Ginsburg House is a two-and-one-half-story structure made of red brick and stone. A carved wood arcade atop stone walls runs the width of the front porch. The statues support the porch roof. The openings for windows and doors have frames and quoins constructed of limestone.

== See also ==
- History of the Jews in Metro Detroit
