= Georgia Day =

US state holiday recognizing its founding

- Observed by: Georgia, United States
- Date: February 12
- Next time: February 12, 2027
- Frequency: annual

Georgia Day is the holiday which the U.S. state of Georgia recognizes in honor of its colonial founding as the Province of Georgia. On February 12, 1733 [NS] James Oglethorpe landed the first settlers in the Anne, at what was to become Georgia's first city (and later the first state capital), Savannah. Not a public holiday, it was created by Georgia's General Assembly, which provided that Feb. 12, "the anniversary of the landing of the first colonists in Georgia under Oglethorpe"—be observed in the public schools as Georgia Day. The law was never repealed, but was not included in the code when it was officially compiled in 1981. Its official legal status is unclear.

Georgia Day is now observed on or around February 12 at the Georgia Day Parade hosted by the Georgia Historical Society as part of the Georgia History Festival.
