= Galeazzo di Santa Sofia =

Italian physician and anatomist

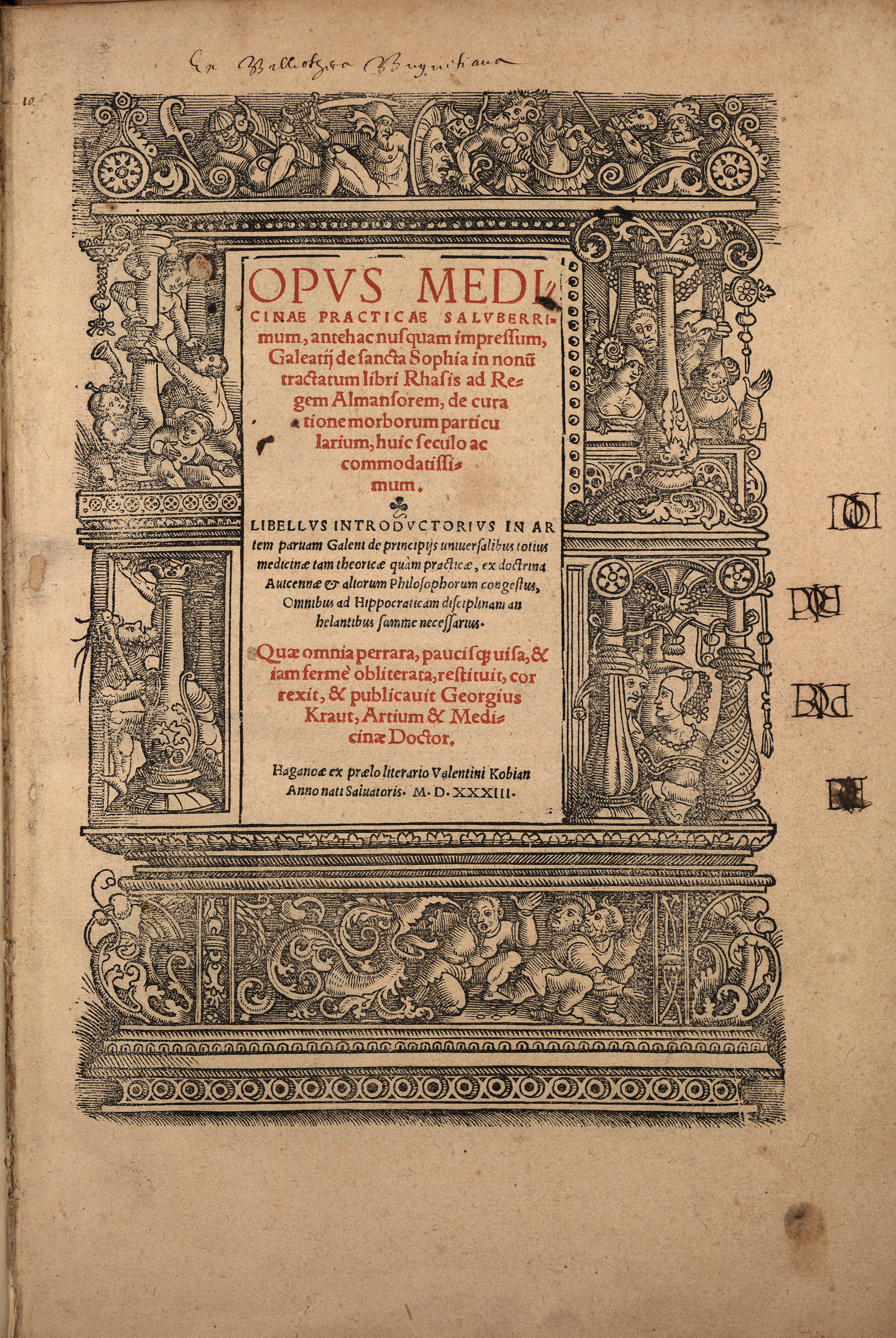
Opus medicinae practicae saluberrimum, title page (1533)

Galeazzo di Santa Sofia (died 1427) was an Italian physician and anatomist.

== Life ==
He taught medicine at the universities in Bologna and Padua. He was called to Vienna where he introduced anatomy as a subject of study and in 1404 made the first dissection north of the Alps.

== Works ==
- Opus medicinae practicae saluberrimum (in Latin). Haguenau: Valentin Kobian. 1533.
