= Congregation Shaarey Zedek (Michigan) =

Synagogue in Southfield, Michigan

Shaarey Zedek
- Hebrew: שַׁעֲרֵי צֶדֶק
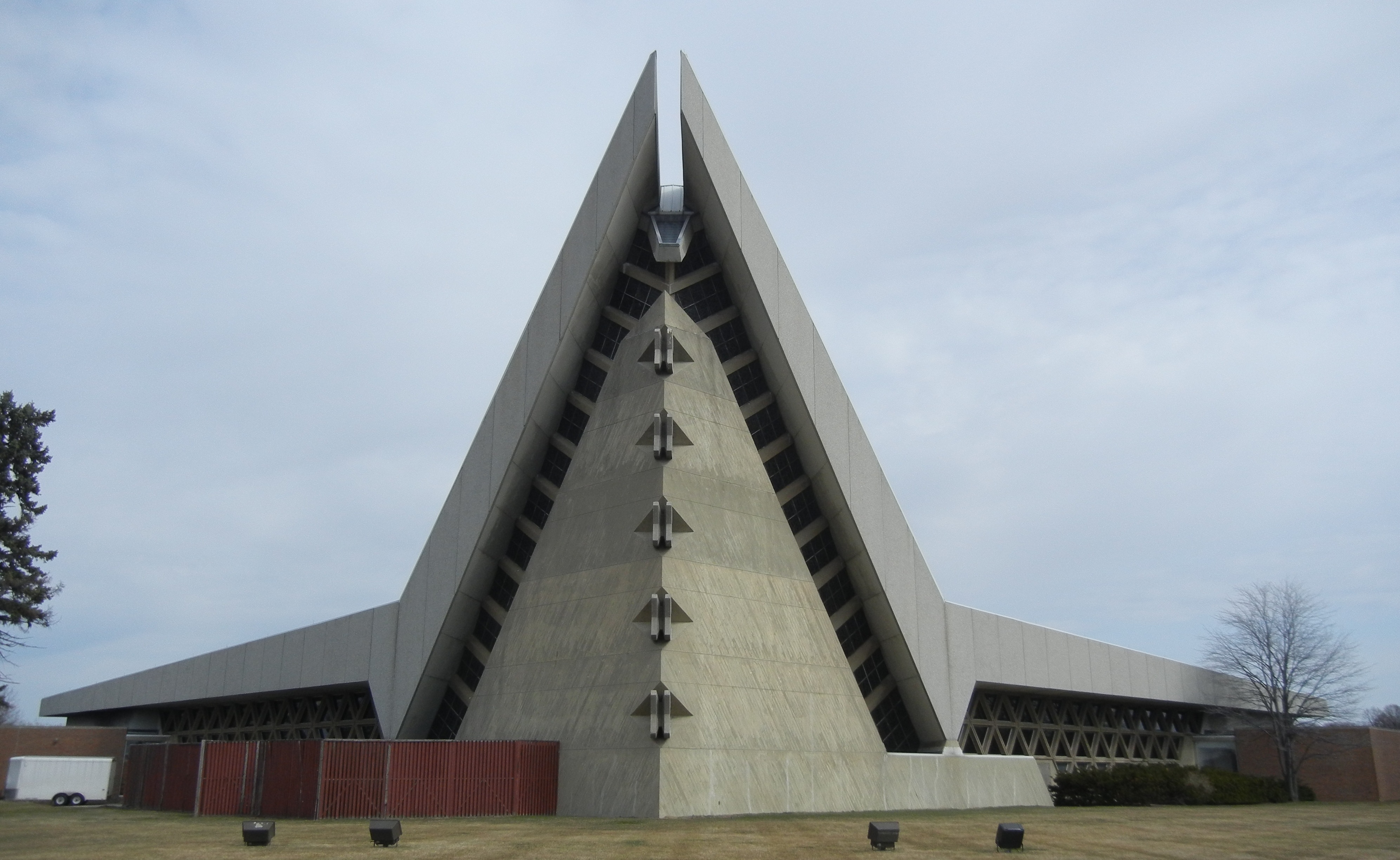

Religion
- Affiliation: Conservative Judaism
- Ecclesiastical or organizational status: Synagogue
- Leadership: Rabbi Aaron Starr; Rabbi Yonatan Dahlen; Cantor David Propis
- Status: Active

Location
- Location: Southfield, Michigan
- Country: United States
- Interactive map of Shaarey Zedek

Architecture
- Architects: Percival Goodman, Albert Kahn Associates
- Type: Synagogue
- Style: Modernist
- Established: 1861 (as a congregation)
- Groundbreaking: May 28, 1961
- Completed: 1861 (1st synagogue); 1877 (2nd synagogue); 1903 (3rd synagogue); 1913 (4th synagogue); 1932 (5th synagogue); 1962 (current synagogue)
- Capacity: 4,000

Website
- www.shaareyzedek.org

Congregation Shaarey Zedek (/ʃaʔaˈʁeiː ˈtsedek/; Hebrew: שַׁעֲרֵי צֶדֶק, romanized: Sha'arei tzedek, transl. 'Gates of Righteousness') is a Conservative synagogue in the Detroit suburb of Southfield, Michigan, in the United States.

== History ==
The congregation was founded in 1861 when a faction of more traditional Jews split off from Temple Beth El. Shaarey Zedek was a founding member of the Conservative United Synagogue of America in 1913.

The congregation worshiped in a building at the intersection of Congress and St. Antoine streets in Detroit from its founding until 1877 when, on the same site, it erected an elaborate Moorish Revival edifice with tall, twin towers topped with Onion domes. It was the first purpose-built synagogue in the Detroit area and the first of no fewer than five synagogue buildings that the congregation would build within the space of a century.

By the early 20th century, many of the temple’s members had moved to wealthier neighborhoods northeast of downtown. In 1903, the congregation erected a new structure topped with an octagonal dome at the intersection of Winder and Brush streets. In 1913, Shaarey Zedek again followed its increasingly wealthy congregants north and moved into a spacious, new, domed Neo-classical synagogue building at Willis and Brush Street where it would remain until 1930, when it moved to rented quarters. In 1932, the congregation again followed the movement of the congregants to a more suburban location on the city's northwest side and completed yet another new building. It was a Romanesque Revival sanctuary at 2900 West Chicago Boulevard at Lawton Street, designed by the noted architect Albert Kahn. The building is now the home of the Clinton Street Greater Bethlehem Temple Church.

After the end of World War Two, housing desegregation in Detroit led most of the city’s Jews to move to the suburbs. The bulk of Shaarey Zedek’s members were part of this exodus. The temple dedicated its present building on Bell Road in suburban Southfield in 1962 amidst the racial transition.

The congregation's present building in Southfield was designed by Percival Goodman. Henry Stoltzman writes that it "embod(ies) Goodman's work at the peak of his career." The San Francisco Examiner named the building one of the "top 10 breathtaking places of worship" in the United States. Jamie Sperti, a writer on The Examiner website called the congregation's dramatic concrete building a "phenomenal example of 1960s futuristic architecture" in her survey of the United States' top 10 breathtaking places of worship published April 9, 2009. The New York Times' architecture critic Philip Nobel described it as a "roadside attraction" that "parlays a skyscraping Ark and an erupting eternal flame into a concrete Sinai on the shoulder of Interstate 696".

== Notable members ==
- Judge Avern Cohn
- William Davidson (1922–2009), businessman, CEO of Guardian Industries and owner of the Detroit Pistons
- Max M. Fisher, businessman, Republican party fundraiser
- Hank Greenberg
- David Hermelin
- Carl Levin, US Senator, brother of Sander
- Sander Levin, US House member, brother of Carl
- Alfred Taubman
