= History of Middle Eastern people in Metro Detroit =

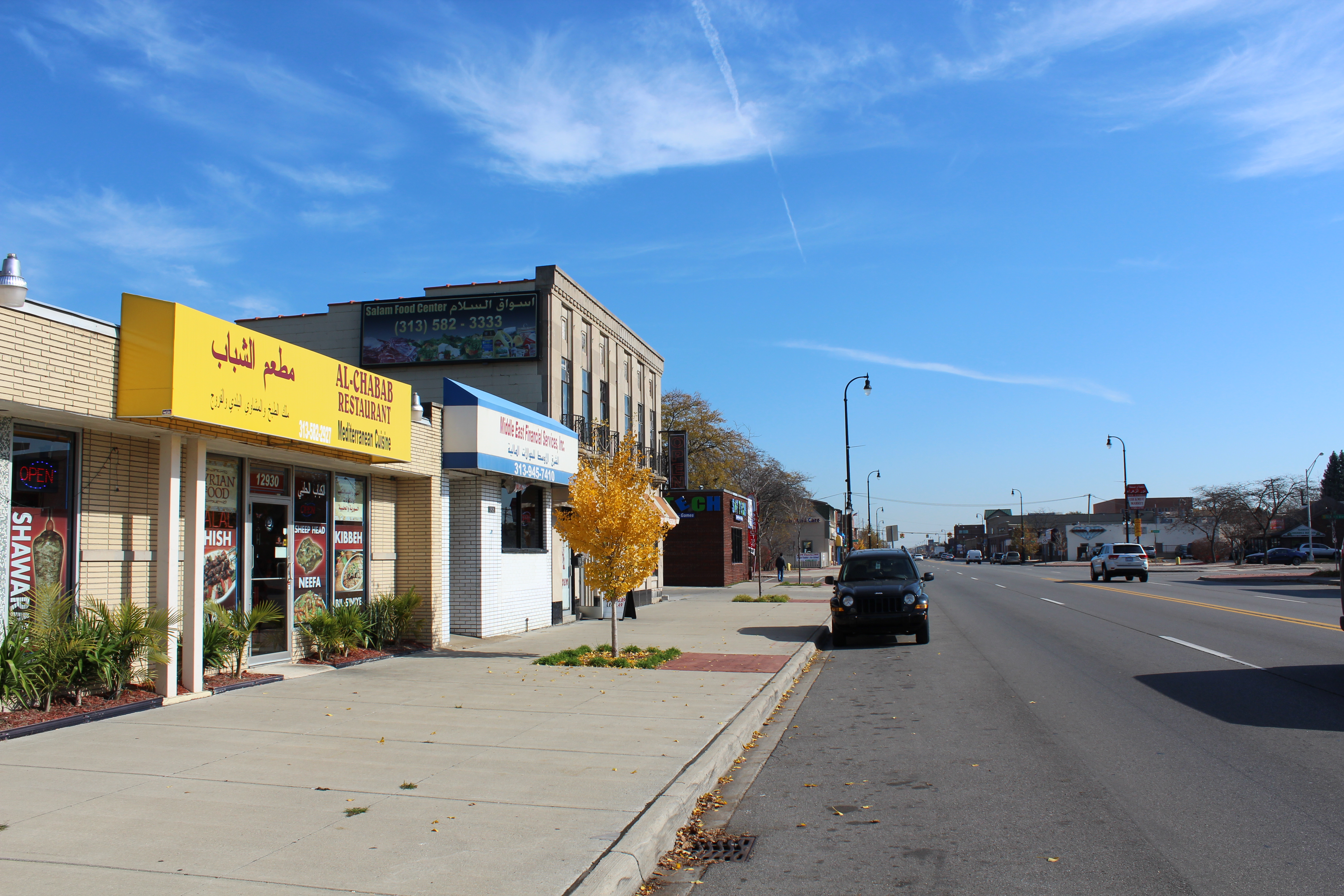
Arab-owned businesses in Dearborn, Michigan

The Detroit metropolitan area has one of the largest concentrations of people of Middle Eastern origin, including Arabs and Chaldo-Assyrians in the United States. As of 2007 about 300,000 people in Southeast Michigan traced their descent from the Middle East. Dearborn's sizeable Arab community consists largely of Lebanese people who immigrated for jobs in the auto industry in the 1920s, and of more recent Yemenis and Iraqis. In 2010 the four Metro Detroit counties had at least 200,000 people of Middle Eastern origin. Bobby Ghosh of TIME said that some estimates gave much larger numbers. From 1990 to 2000 the percentage of people speaking Arabic in the home increased by 106% in Wayne County, 99.5% in Macomb County, and 41% in Oakland County.

From 1990 to 2000 Wayne, Oakland, and Macomb counties had a combined increase of 16,632 people who were born in Iraq. The publication "Arab, Chaldean, and Middle Eastern Children and Families in the Tri-County Area" of the From a Child's Perspective: Detroit Metropolitan Census 2000 Fact Sheets Series states that "Arab and Chaldean representation cannot be determined" in that figure. During the same period there was an increase of 7,229 people born in Lebanon.

== Arab Americans ==
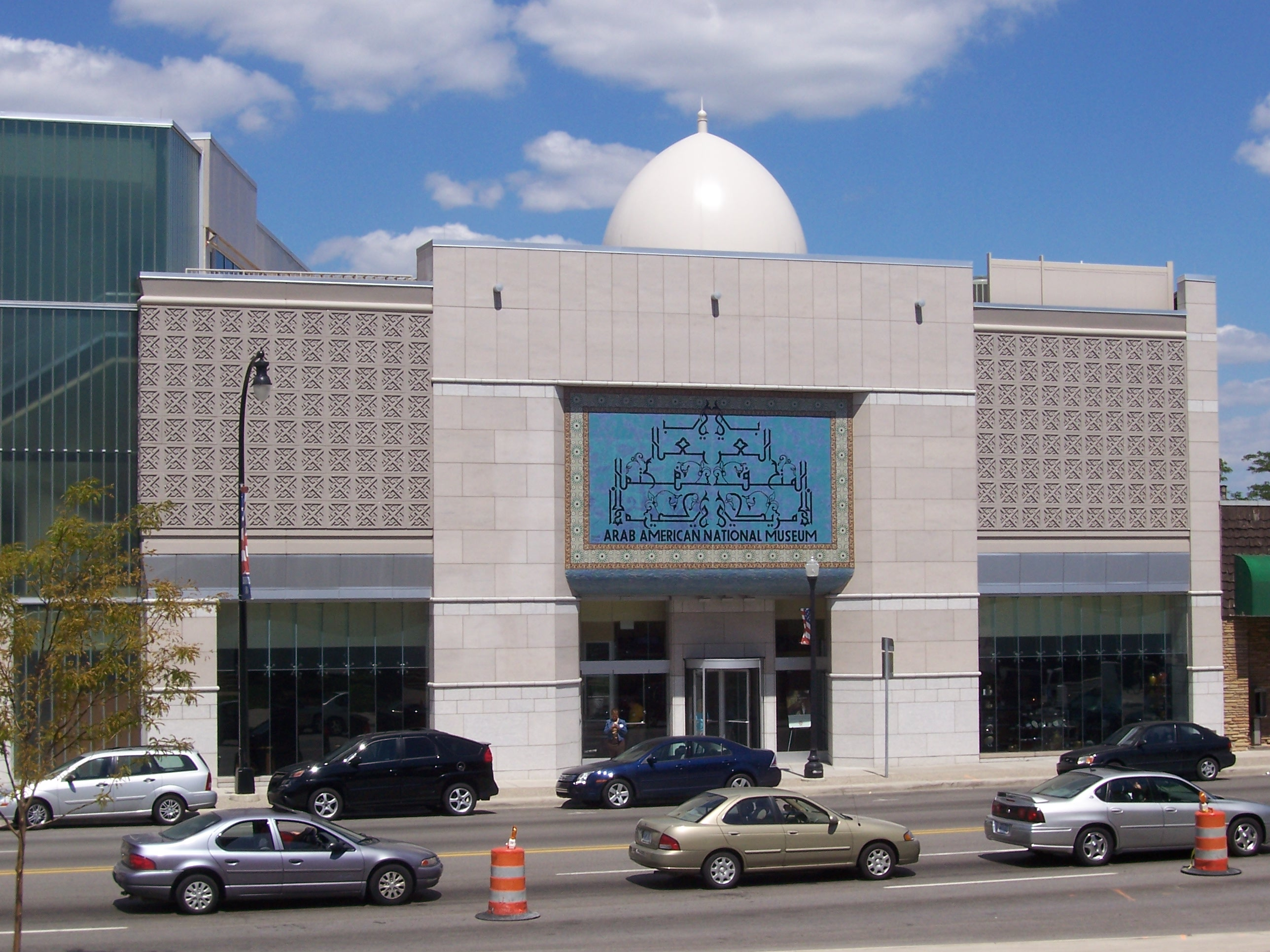
Arab American National Museum in Dearborn

By 2007 Metro Detroit, if defined as Wayne, Oakland, Macomb, and Washtenaw counties, had the United States's largest Arab American population, larger than that of Greater Los Angeles if that region was defined as Los Angeles, Orange, and Ventura counties. As of that year Arab Americans are one of the largest immigrant groups into Southeastern Michigan. The majority of Metro Detroit's Arabs are Lebanese, Palestinian, Iraqis, and Yemeni.

According to Jen'nan Ghazal Read of the U.S. Census Bureau, as of 2000, in the Wayne-Oakland-Macomb-Washtenaw region there were 96,363 persons of Arab ancestry, of whom 92,122 people lived in Wayne, Oakland, or Macomb counties; these made up 79.2% of Michigan residents of Arab ancestry. According to Read, within the Wayne-Oakland-Macomb-Washtenaw region there were 131,650 persons of Arab ancestry in 2004. The largest number of Arab Americans in the Metro Detroit area live in Wayne County. As of 2004 religions among Arab Americans in Detroit include the faiths of Islam and Christianity, with Christian varieties including Maronite, Melkite, Greek Orthodox, and Syriac Orthodox beliefs. The Muslim branches of Sunni and Shia beliefs are present in Metro Detroit. Jordanians and Palestinians in Metro Detroit include believers of Sunni Islam, Catholic, Protestant, and Greek Orthodox Christian beliefs. Yemeni and Iraqi people include believers of the Shafi'i Sunni Muslim school of thought and the Zaidiyyah Shia Muslim school of thought. As of 2004 most recent Arab immigrants to Metro Detroit are Muslim. A 2007 Wayne State University study said that the Metro Detroit Arab American community produced $7.7 billion annually in earnings and salaries. Annually these businesses produced $500 million in taxes to the state.

As of 2006 Hamtramck has a large concentration of Yemeni people.

As of 2004 Arabs stated that they wish to come to Detroit to unify their families, escape from conflicts in the Middle East, and improve their economic standing. As of 2000, victims of population displacement, economic hardship, and political oppression included Palestinians, Yemenis, and Iraqi Chaldo-Assyrians, and refugees from war included Shia from Iraq and Lebanon. Andrew Shryock and Nabeel Abraham, authors of "On Margins and Mainstreams", wrote that "When asked to explain why so many Arabs have migrated to Detroit, most people in the community will mention the automobile industry. As a kind of historical shorthand, this answer is certainly the best."

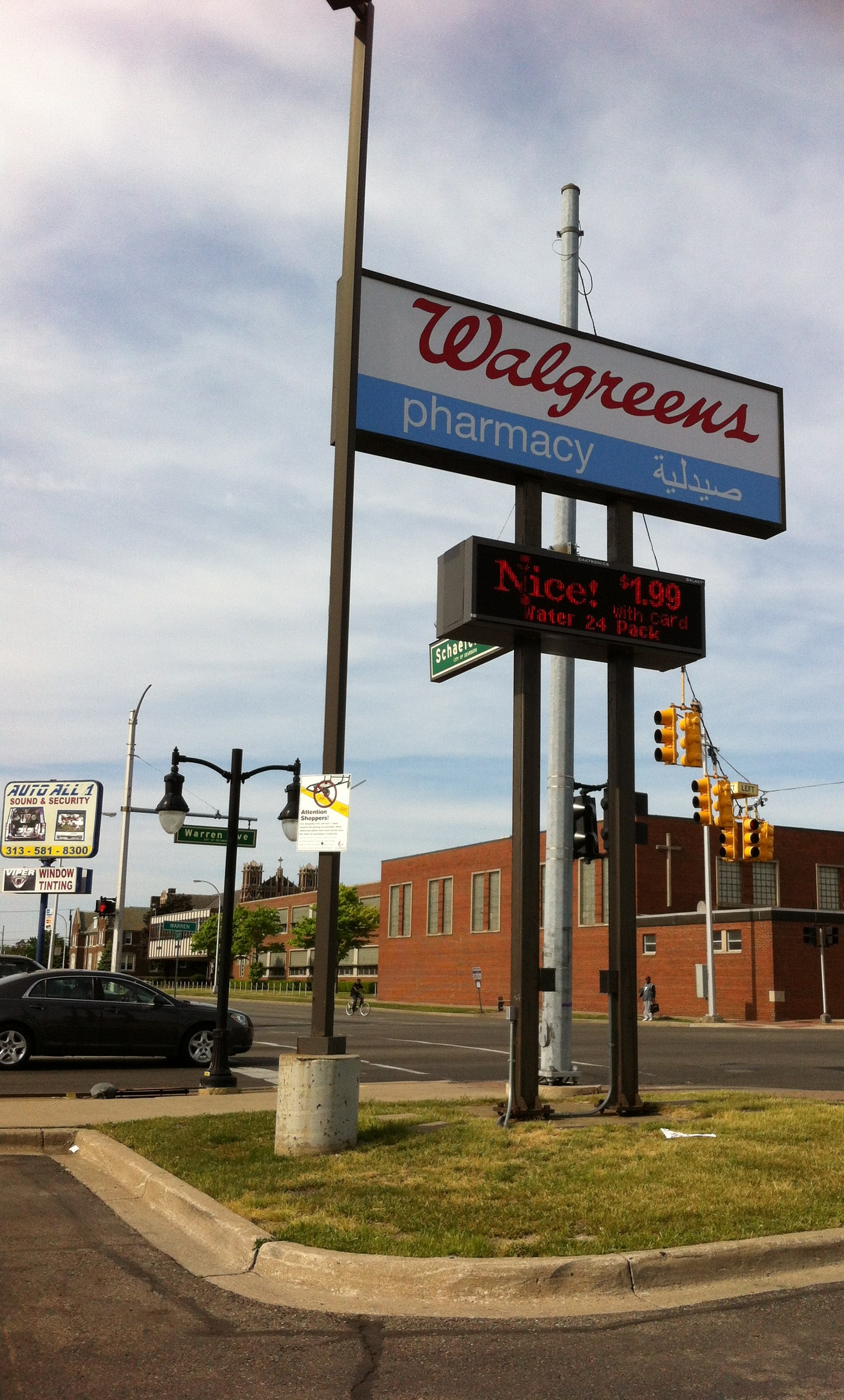
A Walgreens in Dearborn with Arabic signage

=== History of the Arabs ===
Arriving in the early 1870s, the first Middle Eastern settlers in the Detroit area were Syrians. Most of them were Christians, including Maronites, Melkites, and Eastern Orthodox. Some immigrants were Sunni Muslims and Shia Muslims. Some Druze also immigrated. A February 6, 1900 article in the Detroit Free Press stated that "Detroit's Colony of Syrians" included 75-100 people, mostly Maronites from Mount Lebanon. These worked as peddlers and shopkeepers. By 1916, Henry Ford's factories had 555 Syrian employees, including many recently arrived Muslims. Nine thousand Arabic speakers lived in Detroit in 1930. Of them, 6,000 were Syrians. The remainder included Assyrians, Yemenis, and Palestinians. Immigrants from the Levant were originally labeled as being from the Ottoman Province of Syria. After 1920 the Ottoman Empire collapsed and European colonial administrators divided the areas in the Levant into Lebanon, Palestine, and Syria. Therefore immigrants into Detroit began to be classified as Lebanese, Palestinians, and Syrians.

Immigration from Iraq started in the beginning of the 20th century, and immigration from Yemen and the Arabian peninsula began in the early 20th century. A peak immigration of Iraqis occurred from 1927 to 1950, and a peak immigration of Yemenis and those from the Peninsula occurred from 1912 to 1925. Of those three groups, in 1951 most of them lived together in a section of Dearborn. Around 1951 there were about 50,000 people in Detroit who had descent from Lebanon and Syria. Around the same year there were about 4,000 to 5,000 persons in Detroit and Dearborn who had origins from the Arabian Peninsula, Iraq, Yemen, and other Middle Eastern countries. Sally Howell, author of "Competing for Muslims: New Strategies for Urban Renewal in Detroit", wrote that Yemeni people had a presence in the area since the late 1960s. Arab immigrants continued traveling to Detroit even after the automobile industry decline of the 1970s.

The 1975-1990 Lebanese Civil War resulted in a wave of immigration to Detroit.

Many Iraqis immigrated to Metro Detroit after the Gulf War of 1991 and the Iraq War of 2003. The Iraqi community in Metro Detroit supported the 2003 invasion of Iraq.

From 2001 to 2011 the number of members of the American Arab Chamber of Commerce increased from 300 to 1500.

In 2015 Mayor of Detroit Mike Duggan announced his city was accepting 50 Syrian families from the Syrian Civil War and will support them for a three year period.

=== Demographics of Arabs ===
Since their immigration to the United States in the 1870s, the Arab population has been continuously increasing. This increase can be observed in data collected by The American Community Survey and U.S Census Bureau. To determine this amount, surveys are sent out asking each individual to identify his or her "ancestry or ethnic origin." This phrase is defined by the U.S Census Bureau as ethnic origin, descent, roots, heritage or place of person's or ancestor's birth. The U.S Census Bureau considers individuals who reported being one of the following ethnic origins as an Arab: Algerian, Bahraini, Egyptian, Emirati, Iraqi, Jordanian, Kuwaiti, Lebanese, Libyan, Moroccan, Omani, Palestinian, Qatari, Saudi Arabian, Syrian, Tunisian, and Yemeni.

With the aforementioned criteria, it was estimated that 850,000 people with Arab ancestry (0.35 percent of the total population) lived in the United States in 1990. In 2004, 1.2 million (0.42 percent of the total population) resided in the U.S. The 2006–2010 ACS 5-year estimates show that an estimated 1.5 million people (0.5 percent of the total population) with Arab ancestry were living in the United States, representing a 76.0 percent increase since 1990. Currently, the ten states with the largest Arab populations are California, Michigan, New York, Florida, Texas, New Jersey, Illinois, Ohio, Massachusetts, and Pennsylvania, respectively. These populations are generally concentrated in metropolitan areas.

Arab American communities are generally tight-knit, as they value family, tradition, and economic achievement. Earlier immigrants worked as peddlers and in factories. More recent immigrants, however, have taken up roles in all parts of society, including public leadership positions. These increasingly professional roles have helped establish a majority of the populations in bustling cities. Consequently, their increasing role in high-level positions has helped raise the median income of Arab American households to $56,433 compared to the $51,914 for all households in the United States.

=== Economy of Arabs ===
Many Lebanese own and operate stores, restaurants, shops, and other major businesses; they were historically known for this.

=== Religion of Arabs ===
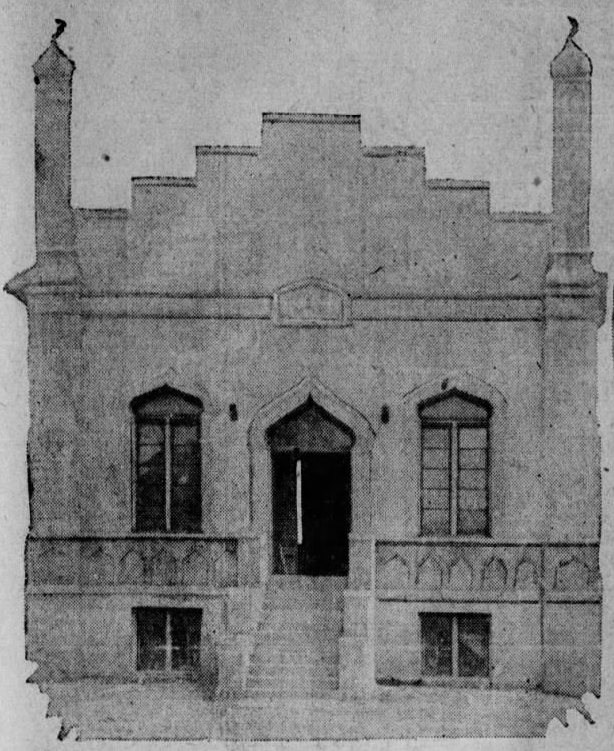
The Highland Park Mosque operated in Detroit in the 1920s was the first mosque built in the US

The Islamic Center of America (Arabic: المركز الإسلامي في اميركا[1]) is a mosque located in Dearborn, Michigan. Although the institution dates back to 1963, [2] the Center's current mosque opened in 2005. It is the largest mosque in North America[3][4] and the oldest Shia mosque in the United States.[5] With its large Shia Arab population (consisting mostly of Lebanese), Dearborn is often called the "heart of Shiism" in the United States.

The Mu'ath bin Jabal Mosque (Arabic: مسجد معاذ بن جبل), was established in 1976. Sally Howell, author of "Competing for Muslims: New Strategies for Urban Renewal in Detroit", wrote that the mosque "has been credited" by public officials and area Muslims "with having turned around one of Detroit's roughest neighborhoods at the height of the crack cocaine epidemic of the 1980s, making its streets safe, revitalizing a dormant housing market, attracting new business to the area, and laying the foundation for an ethnically mixed, highly visible Muslim population in Detroit and Hamtramck."

== Assyrian Americans ==
By 2004, the Metro Detroit area was home to the largest Assyrian community in the diaspora. Most Chaldo-Assyrians who had emigrated to Metro Detroit originate from northern Iraq, although some originate from northwestern Iran, northeastern Syria, and southeastern Turkey. Often when immigrating, Assyrians in Detroit were employed in business, grocery, and market management. However, in modern times, many in the younger generations are looking to enter more advanced fields such as medicine and engineering. Most of the Assyrians in Detroit often identify as Chaldean, due to being members of the Chaldean Catholic Church, as well as a general lack of knowledge on the larger Assyrian community elsewhere and history.

According to the US census of 2007, there were 32,322 Assyrians in the Wayne, Macomb, Oakland, and Washtenaw four-county region of Michigan. The publication "Arab, Chaldean, and Middle Eastern Children and Families in the Tri-County Area" of the From a Child's Perspective: Detroit Metropolitan Census 2000 Fact Sheets Series states that "Many Chaldeans believe they have a unique ethnic identity other than Arab and wish not to be considered part of the Arab population.” As of 2004, Chaldean Catholic Assyrians in Wayne, Oakland, and Macomb counties make up 94% of the Assyrian population of the State of Michigan.

=== Community history ===
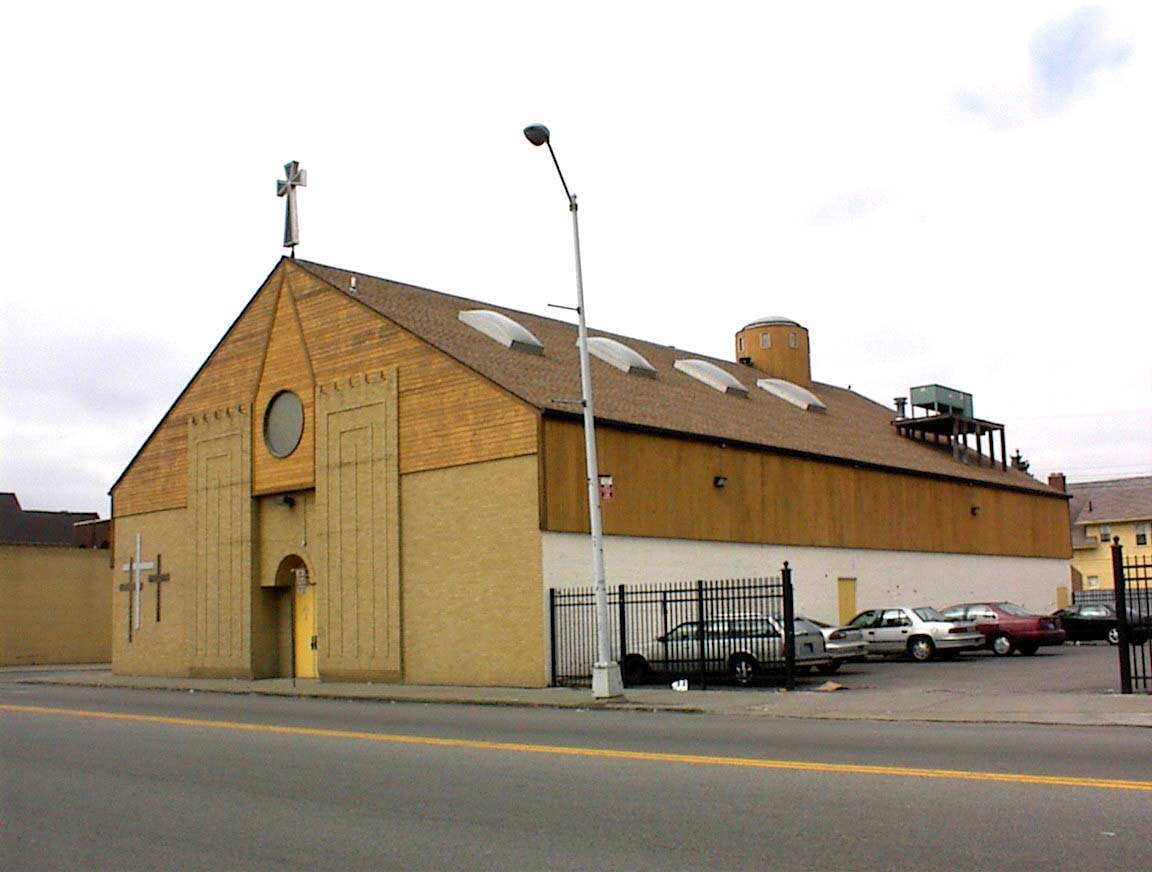
Sacred Heart Chaldean Church in Chaldean Town, Detroit

The first Chaldeans arrived in the early 1900s, taking jobs in the automobile industry. The first large Chaldean-Assyrian immigration wave to Detroit was in the 1920s as a result of the Assyrian genocide; by 1953, there were 300 Chaldean Catholic families in Detroit. However, the majority of the Chaldean population settled in Metro Detroit in the late 1960s, settling in this area because of job availability in the automobile industry, the presence of a Maronite Christian community (in which both communities shared many similarities), and a pre-existing community in Detroit and nearby Windsor, Ontario. Typically, newly arrived immigrants initially worked in small family-owned stores which older groups setup. As time passed, more and more Chaldo-Assyrians moved to Detroit and found jobs at existing stores operated by their relatives. The stores became larger, becoming large convenience stores. Once the socioeconomic standing of Assyrian families improved, older groups moved to the suburbs. During the first wave they settled Oak Park and Southfield, and during the second wave they moved to Birmingham, Bloomfield Hills, Farmington Hills, and West Bloomfield Township.

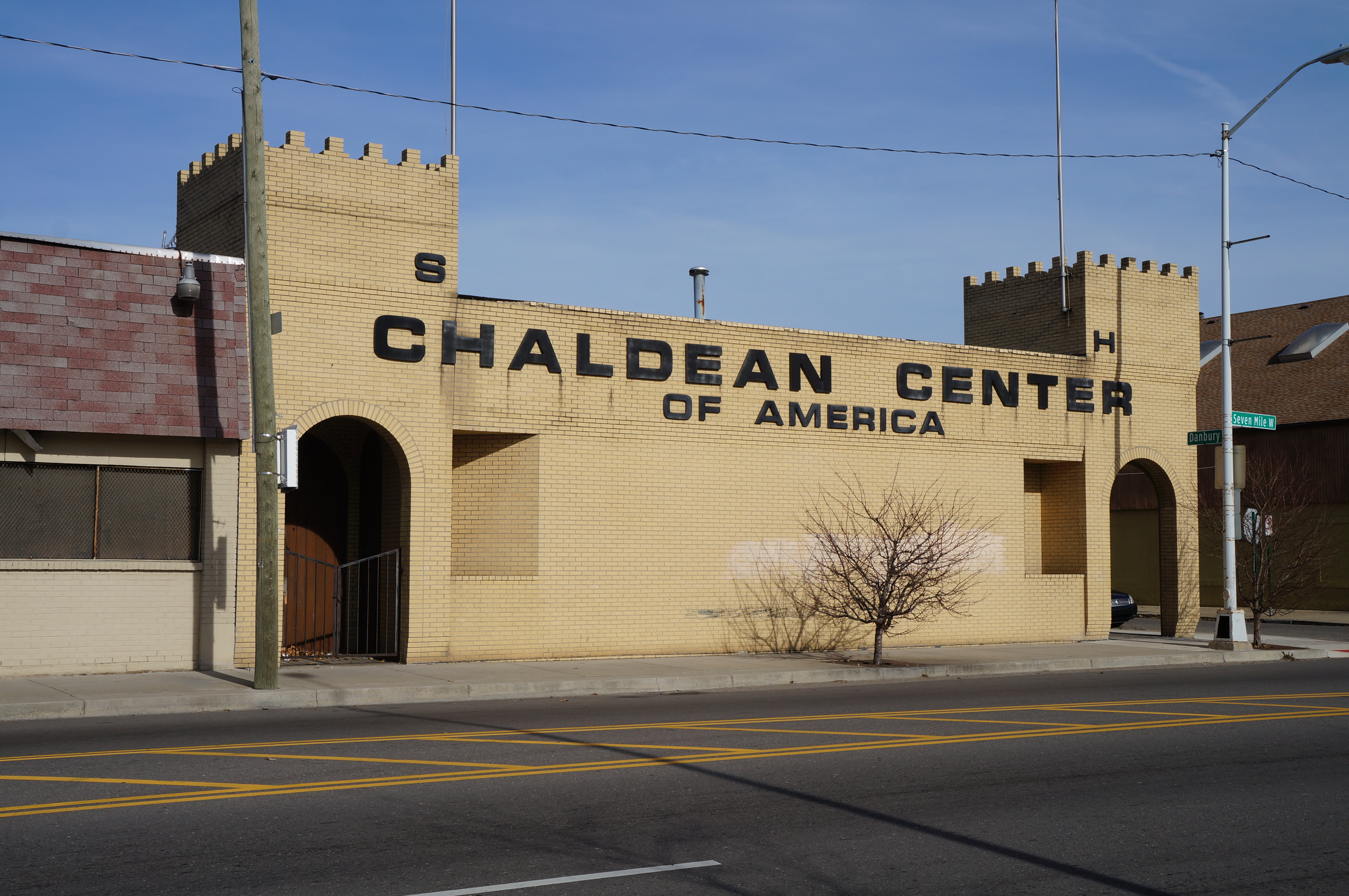
Chaldean Center of America in Chaldean Town

Around 1979, after Jacob Yasso, the reverend of the Sacred Heart Chaldean Church (Imperial Aramaic: ܥܕܬܐ ܕܠܒܗ ܕܡܪܢ ܕܟܠܕܝ̈ܐ ʿēttāʾ d-lebbēh d-māran d-ḵaldāyēʾ), congratulated Saddam Hussein on becoming the President of Iraq, Saddam donated $250,000 ($1109009.63 when adjusted for inflation) to the church. In 1980, Saddam gave Yasso $200,000 ($781502.42 when adjusted for inflation) after Yasso told Saddam his church had $170,000 ($664277.06 when adjusted for inflation) in debts. WDIV-TV (Channel 4) wrote that the funds "reportedly helped build" the Chaldean Center of America, a building on Seven Mile Road adjacent to the church which housed church offices, an English-language school, and a cultural museum. In honor of Saddam's efforts, Yasso presented Saddam with the "Key to the City" procured by Mayor of Detroit Coleman Young.

Officials from the U.S. State Department stated that, at the time, Saddam had given at least $1.7 million to Assyrian organizations across the United States, with most concentrated in Detroit. Yasmeen S. Hanoosh, the author of The Politics of Minority Chaldeans Between Iraq and America, wrote that the giveways were called donations, but were interpreted as bribes. State Department officials also stated that the Iraqi government was establishing spy networks in these communities at that time. Reports from U.S. and Assyrian media stated that in the period around 1979-1980, the Iraqi government attempted to continue its domestic policy of Arabization of Chaldeans in the United States through liaisons in churches, attempting to improve its image either through bribes or threats.

As of 1990, there were about 50,000 to 60,000 Assyrians in the metropolitan area. The community began moving further inward to Metro Detroit in the 1990s, starting with Southfield and West Bloomfield. From 1990 to 2000, the population of Chaldeans in Oakland County increased by 10,903, in Macomb County by 7,579, and in Wayne County by 219. Macomb County had the largest percentage increase, at 426.5%. By the 2000s, they began moving to areas in Macomb County including Shelby Township, Sterling Heights, and Warren. Estimates from Chaldean Catholic churches in 2002 stated that 4,200 Chaldo-Assyrians lived in these cities at the time. By 2004, the Chaldean Cultural Center (Imperial Aramaic: ܩܢܛܪܘܢ ܝܪܬܘܬܢܝܐ ܟܠܕܝܐ qenṭrōn yārtūṯānāyāʾ kaldāyāʾ), has been established.

In 2023, a study conducted in collaboration with the Chaldean Community Foundation and Walsh College revealed that the Chaldean population had increased to 183,500, and that their economic impact had increased upwards of $17.6 billion.

=== Chaldo-Assyrian neighborhoods ===
During the 1950s, Highland Park and Woodward Avenue had a high concentrations of Assyrians. The community's focal point later shifted to Southfield. As of 2004, of the Assyrians in the tri-county area, 58% resided in Oakland County, while date from Wayne County a few years prior dictated 2,629 Assyrians residing in the community.

Areas that had Assyrian residents c. 2001 included Chaldean Town in Detroit, Southfield, Oak Park, Troy, and West Bloomfield Township. Assyrian residents of Chaldean Town tended to be low-income elderly people and recent immigrants from the Middle East. By 2014, in addition to West Bloomfield, Farmington Hills and Sterling Heights had also received Assyrians due to higher income stability. The Chaldean Federation of America, an umbrella organization for most of the areas Assyrian groups, had its offices in Southfield. As of that year, the largest Chaldean Catholic church building in terms of the number of congregants resided in Southfield. The city also had the area's sole Assyrian retirement home, the Chaldean Social Club Southfield Manor, and a popular Assyrian restaurant named La Fendi.

=== Grocery industry ===
Assyrians have a near monopoly over Detroit's grocery stores, largely due to white flight as a result of the 1967 Detroit riot. In 1962, 120 grocery stores were operated by Assyrians, and over half of Assyrian households were supported by proceeds from the grocery business. After the riots, Assyrians purchased abandoned businesses at rock bottom prices, increasing the level of ownership in the community. In 1972, there were 278 grocery stores in Detroit owned by Assyrians, and by the mid-1990s, that number had increased to 1,500.

Most of the customers of these stores were African Americans living in the city, which has caused some notable instances of tension between the two groups in the past. There has been resentment against Assyrian businesses because, as family-owned operations, many do not hire outside employees, including African Americans. Many also felt an underlying discrimation had occurred through overcharging for orders. According to the Associated Food Dealers of Michigan (AFD), only larger stores had mixed race employment with African Americans and Assyrians working together. Natalie Jill Smith, author of "Ethnicity, Reciprocity, Reputation and Punishment: An Ethnoexperimental Study of Cooperation among the Chaldeans and Hmong of Detroit (Michigan)", stated that she "met few grocers who employed Blacks" and that employees unrelated to the owners are more likely to be Assyrians or Caucasian Americans. Violence has been a past phenomenon amongst Chaldo-Assyrian business owners, with several having died in these incidents. Relations between African American and Assyrian communities in Chaldean Town almost reached a breaking point in the late 20th century, with killings across both groups leading to heightened tensions. However, many young Assyrians today are now pursuing more professional fields for work, attending universities and abandoning the traditional grocery model.

=== Culture ===
In Chaldo-Assyrian culture, traditional family and religious values are increasingly important to the community, even as younger generations are becoming more Americanized. This may be due to the fact that Assyrian culture is based on tribal bloodlines and family origin. Most Assyrians in Metro Detroit trace their origins to Iraq (particularly Tel Keppe in the Nineveh Plains) or Turkey.

=== Institutions ===
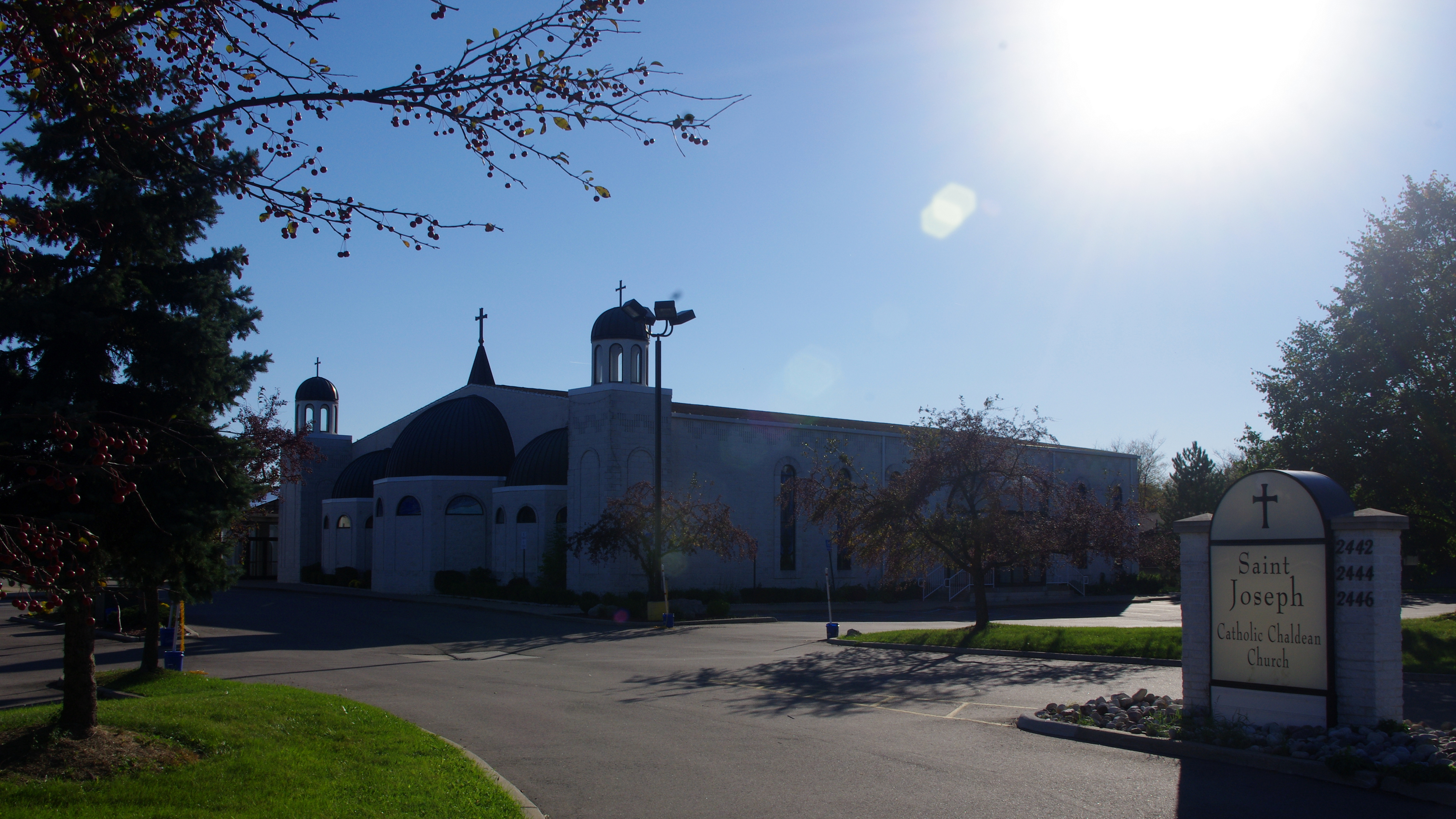
Saint Joseph Chaldean Catholic Church in Troy

In Metro Detroit as of 2007, there were five Chaldean Catholic churches, with one in Chaldean Town and one each in Oak Park, Southfield, Troy, and West Bloomfield Township. In 2015 Sacred Heart Church of Chaldean Town moved to Warren.

The Chaldean Federation of America (CFA) oversees several Detroit-area Assyrian clubs while the Chaldean-Iraqi Association of Michigan (CIAM) oversees the Shenandoah Country Club and Southfield Manor, two Assyrian social clubs. Assyrians have a group participation rate above the American average.

The Community Education Center, a government-funded center owned by Assyrians, is located on Woodward Avenue in Chaldean Town, near Seven Mile. Asaad Yousif Kalasho founded the center. The teachers and most of the students are Assyrian and they provide free education.

One group, Chaldean Americans Reaching and Encouraging (CARE), takes efforts to improve the Assyrian community such as doing food drives. As of 2001 most of the members are in their early 20s. Another organization, Chaldean American Ladies of Charity, is also popularly cited by the community.

The Chaldean Community Foundation is headquartered in Sterling Heights. Connected organizations, such as the Chaldean Cultural Center, Chaldean Chamber of Commerce, and Chaldean News, are located further west in Farmington Hills and West Bloomfield.

== Coptic Americans ==
As of 2008 about 3,000 Egyptian Copts lived in the state of Michigan, mainly in Metro Detroit. Many Copts do not consider themselves Arab and see themselves as being the descendants of ancient Egyptians, while anthropologists classify them as Arabs due to cultural and linguistic features.

St. Mark Coptic Orthodox Church in Troy is the religious center of the Copts. Pope Shenouda III laid the first cornerstone of the church. Construction began on May 1, 1977 and was completed in May 1979, with the first Holy Communion on May 8 of that year and consecration in 1981, from June 12 through June 14. The Coptic community is scattered across Metro Detroit, with many living far away from the church. Some members of the church live in northern Ohio.

== Geography ==
Yemeni mural by Dasic Fernandez in Hamtramck, Michigan

As of 2014, Dearborn's population was about 40% of Arab origin. At first Arabs mainly settled the Southend and east Dearborn and the main concentration is in those areas. By 2005 a popular Arab restaurant had opened in west Dearborn, and a group of Arab Americans had settled in adjacent in Warrendale, Detroit, most of whom were Lebanese. By 2014, Arab Americans had been moving into Dearborn Heights, with the north end having more Arabs compared to the south end. Many Arab businesses in Dearborn established branch operations in Dearborn Heights. In 2014, the Dearborn Heights director of community and economic development, Ron Amen, stated that Arabs are about 25% of the city's population. In the 2019 U.S. Census estimates, the largest ethnic group were Lebanese Americans, and the second largest were Yemeni Americans. Yemeni Americans, as of 2023, are the largest group in Detroit of MENA ancestry, and make up one third of MENA residents in Detroit.

Many Arabs have been moving to Macomb County, Oakland County, and Canton in Wayne County.

As of 2014 about 25% of the population of Hamtramck was of Arab origin. Yemenis form the majority of that city's Arabs. Hakim Almasmari wrote in 2006 that "Several streets seem to be populated exclusively by Yemeni Americans, and Yemeni culture pervades the city’s social, business, and political life." Many Yemeni restaurants are in Hamtramck, and the Yemeni community operates the Mu'ath bin Jabal Mosque (Arabic: مسجد معاذ بن جبل), which was established in 1976. According to Almasmari, Yemeni people first arrived in Hamtramck in the 1960s. The "Building Islam in Detroit: Foundations/Forms/Futures" project of the University of Michigan stated that Yemenis began arriving in the 1970s. In 2013 Dasic Fernandez, a Chilean artist, created a 90-foot (27 m) by 30-foot (9.1 m) mural on the Sheeba restaurant celebrating the Yemeni population. The mural depicts a girl in a veil decorated with the blue sky, a farmer wearing a turban and a woman in a hijab. The Arab American and Chaldean Council and the coalition OneHamtramck commissioned the mural.

Lebanese American Christians had settled in several areas of Metro Detroit, including the Grosse Pointes. Many of them do not consider themselves as Arab. By 2014 many Lebanese American Christians had assimilated into American culture.

By 1985 many Palestinian Christians had settled in Farmington, Livonia, and Westland. The Palestinians in Livonia, many of whom operated small and medium-sized businesses, originated from Ramallah.

== Politics ==
As of 2014, Susan Dabaja, the city council president of Dearborn, is a Muslim Arab-American and the majority of the members of the council are Arab.

In 2021 Niraj Warikoo of the Detroit Free Press reported that Yemeni Americans in Dearborn were advocating for more of a role in their city's government.

In 2015, Hamtramck, where 60% of the population is reported to be Muslim, elected its first majority Muslim city council. During the campaign, flyers appeared that said, "Get the Muslims out of Hamtramck." In 2021 their city council became all-Muslim with its first-ever Muslim mayor (previously, the mayors had been Polish); and in 2023 the city banned pride flags, explaining that because they are a diverse community, they did not want to provide "special treatment" to any specific groups. The mayor also claimed the issue was "divisive".

== Demographics ==
As of 2014, 17% of the immigrants in the Global Detroit studies that are under the Middle East category are Assyrians.

Global Detroit stated that there are 36,000 immigrants from Iraq in Macomb, Oakland, Wayne, and Washtenaw counties. This makes the Iraqis the second-largest immigrant group in Metro Detroit. There are over 16,000 persons of Iraqi origins in Oakland County, 14,198 persons of Iraqi origins in Macomb County, and 5,400 persons of Iraqi origins in Wayne County. Chaldean Catholics are most of the Iraqis in both Oakland and Macomb counties. The Iraqis are the second largest immigrant group in Oakland County. Most Iraqis in Wayne County live in Dearborn and other Arab communities.

As of 2014, Global Detroit stated that 17,800 persons with Lebanese ancestry live in Metro Detroit, with 14,625 of them in Wayne County. Of the immigrant groups, the Lebanese are the sixth-largest.

In 2023, according to the US Census, Wayne Country has the highest percentage of residents with Lebanese ancestry in any US county. Also in 2023, Iraqis are the largest MENA group in Michigan. Lebanese are the second largest and Yemenis the third.

Andrew Shryock and Nabeel Abraham, editors of Arab Detroit, stated that many of the subgroups of Middle Eastern Americans have different dialects of Arabic, and that they often "keep very much to themselves" and do not intermarry or socialize with one another.

== Economy ==
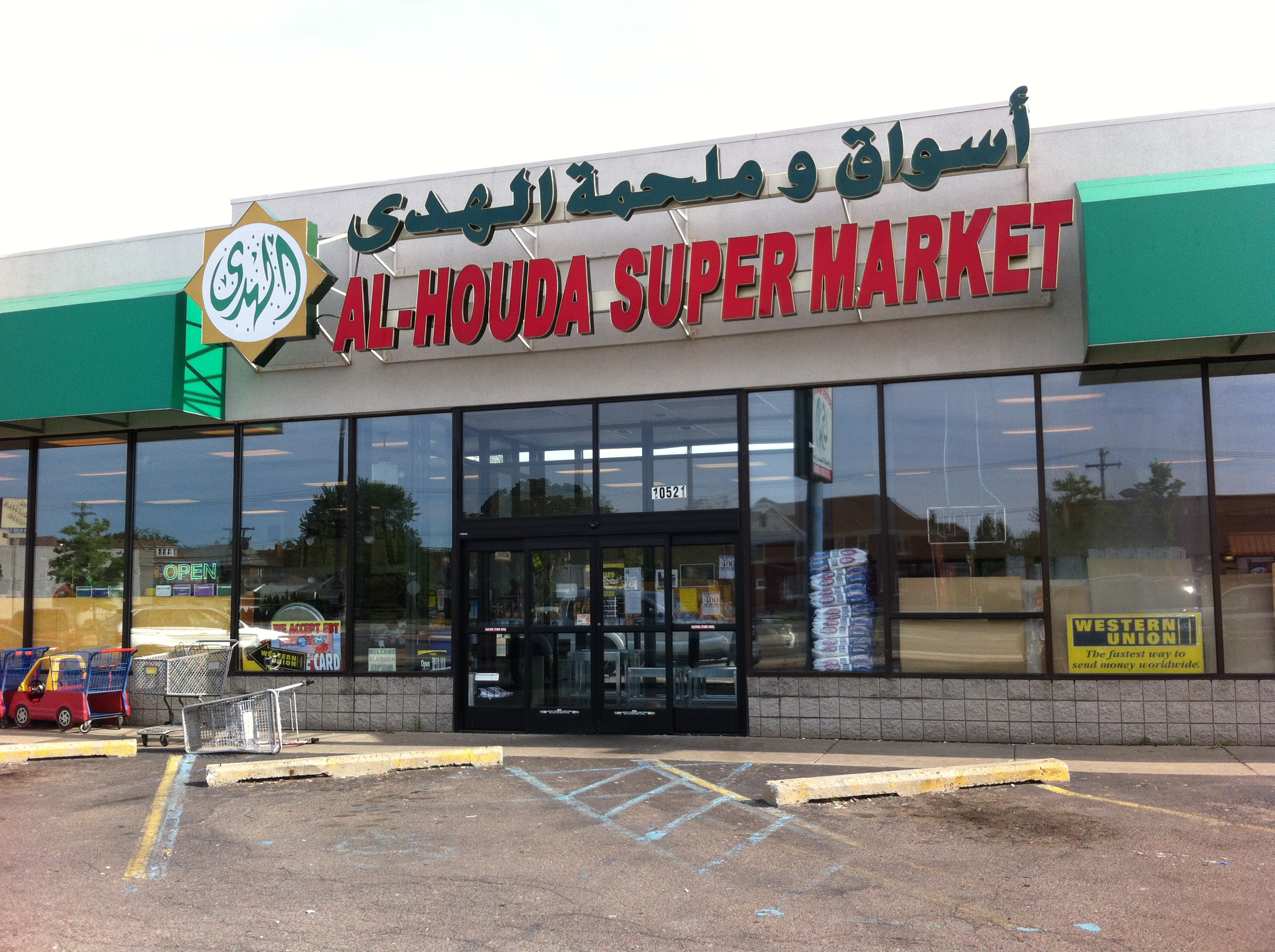
Al-Houda Supermarket (أسواق و ملحمة الهدى) in Dearborn

As of 2000 most Arab immigrants enter the service economy or work in small, family-operated stores. In Metro Detroit, in 1994 there were over 5,000 Arab-owned businesses.

The "Arab American Economic Contribution Study: Gauging the economic contributions that persons of Arab ancestry have on Southeast Michigan’s Economy" of 2007 wrote that Arab Americans are over-represented in food services industry, accommodations, and other services such as repair services and personal services. These industries pay less than other industries. The report stated that Arab Americans held about 47,924 to 58,515 jobs in Wayne, Macomb, Oakland, and Washtenaw counties. It also concluded that between 99,494 and 141,541 jobs in the four county region are a part of employment associated with Arab American economic activity, making up 4.0 to 5.7% of the jobs in that region.

The Chaldean American Chamber of Commerce stated in 2012 that over 200 Chaldean Assyrian business owners in Metro Detroit were murdered from the 1970s to 2012. The president of the chamber of commerce and the Chaldean Community Foundation, Martin Manna, stated that year, "We've seen acceleration, unfortunately, (with) four incidents in just a year." The executive director of the American Arab Chamber of Commerce, Fay Beydoun, stated that year that "We don’t have an exact number" of the Arab businesspeople who were murdered "but we are aware of many from our community who have been killed."

== Media ==
The Arab American News is published in Dearborn.

The Chaldean News is published in Southfield.

Other Middle Eastern-origin print media include Al-Muntada (a magazine), Arab American Message, Arab American Journal, Chaldean Detroit Times, Chaldean Voice, and Harp Magazine. Other forms of media include Arab Network of America, Arabic Time (television program), TV Orient, and United TV Network.

There are two radio stations heard in Metro Detroit that target the Middle-Eastern community, WNZK and CINA.

== Pan-Middle Eastern institutions ==
Political organizations in the region include Arab American Political Action Committee, Arab American Voter Registration and Education Committee, and Iraqi Democratic Union.

== Education ==
In a thirty-year period ending sometime prior to 2010 Dearborn Public Schools and Detroit Public Schools both developed policies to accommodate Arab and Muslim students in collaboration with administrators, parents, teachers, and students. Policies adopted by the districts included observances of Muslim holidays, Arabic-language programs, policies concerning prayer, and rules regarding modesty of females in physical education and sports. Since the early 1980s, Dearborn district schools have vegetarian meals as alternative to non-halal meals. As of 2010 some schools use discretionary funds to offer halal meals, but most schools do not offer halal meals since they cannot get affordable prices from distributors.

In 2005, Highland Park Schools made plans to attract Arab and Muslim students resident in Detroit and Hamtramck. Dr. Theresa Saunders, the superintendent of the school system, hired Yahya Alkebsi (Arabic: يحيى الكبسي), a Yemeni-American educator, as the district's Arab Muslim consultant. It added Arabic-speaking teachers and began offering instruction in Arabic. Sallow Howell, author of "Competing for Muslims: New Strategies for Urban Renewal in Detroit", said that the district began treating "Muslim families more directly like consumers". Howell said that the district agreed "to segregate Muslim students from mainstream classrooms" but that the district routinely denied that this was the case. Alkebsi said that he would bring halal food to HPS schools, but he was unable to do so. The district instead had vegetarian options. Since that time Highland Park School district has been dissolved. Several charter schools offering daily Arabic classes have opened in Hamtramck, Dearborn and Hamtramck adjacent parts of Detroit.

In 2015, the Keys Grace Academy became the first public school academy in the United States to teach the Assyrian language, culture and history, located in Madison Heights, MI. It is operated by Kalasho Empowerment of Young Scholars and provides free education as a charter school. 90% of the students are of Assyrian descent.

== Diplomatic missions ==
The Consulate of Iraq in Detroit is in Southfield. The Consulate-General of Lebanon in Detroit is located in Suite 560 in the New Center One Building in New Center, Detroit.

== Notable people ==
- Abraham Aiyash (Yemeni), politician
- Danny Thomas, born Amos Muzyad Yaqoob Kairouz, actor and philanthropist of Lebanese descent.
- Saladin Ahmed, Arab-American science fiction writer of Egyptian and Lebanese descent.
- Andrew Bazzi (Lebanese) - Canton Township
- Mohamad Jawad Chirri
- Rima Fakih (Lebanese Arab) - Dearborn
- Abdullah Hammoud (Lebanese-American) - first Arab mayor of Dearborn, Michigan
- Ali Kabbani, better known as Myth (Syrian-American) - Dearborn
- Casey Kasem (Lebanese Druze) - Detroit
- Manuel Moroun (Lebanese-American) - Owner of Ambassador Bridge
- Hassan Al-Qazwini (Iraqi Arab) - Shia religious leader
- Serena Shim (Lebanese-American) journalist born in Detroit
- Rashida Tlaib (Palestinian-American) - Detroit - Congresswoman
- Paul Elia - Chaldean-Assyrian Comedian based in Detroit area
- Janan Sawa - Iraqi singer-songwriter of Assyrian descent

Fictional characters:

- Simon Baz (Lebanese Arab) DC Comics Character
- Minah Amin, Lebanese American
- Raina Amin, Lebanese American

== See also ==
- Arab American
- Assyrian Americans
- Chaldean Catholics
- Demographics of Metro Detroit
- Iraqi diaspora
- Islam in Metro Detroit
- Refugees of Iraq
