= Christian emigration =

Large-scale migration of Christians

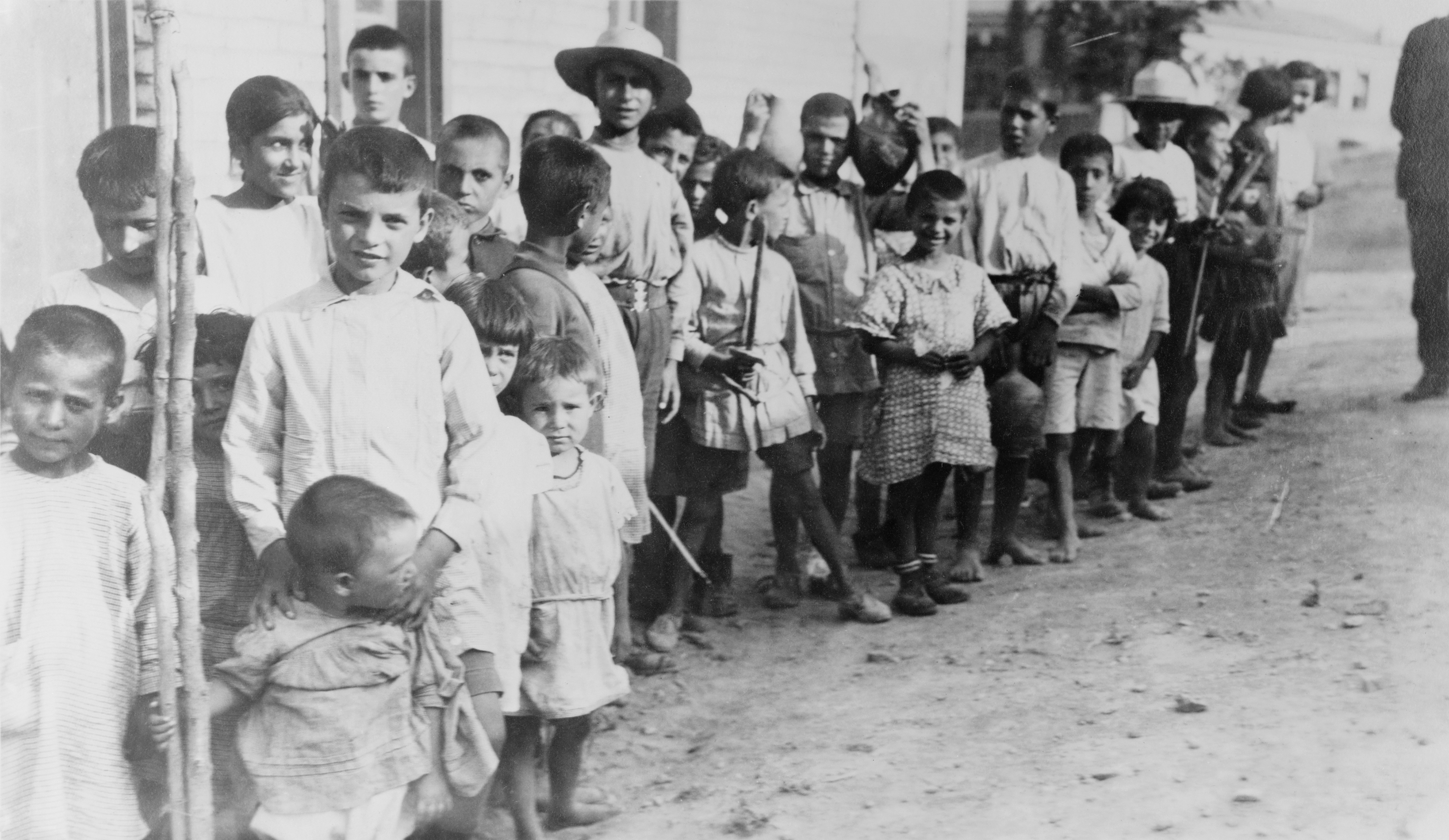
Christian Greek and Armenian refugee children in Athens in 1923, following the population exchange between Turkey and Greece

The phenomenon of large-scale Christian migration is the main reason why Christians' share of the population has been declining in many countries. Many Muslim countries have witnessed disproportionately high emigration rates among their Christian minorities for several generations. Today, most Middle Eastern people in the United States are Christians, and the majority of Arabs living outside the Arab World are Arab Christians.

Push factors motivating Christians to emigrate include religious discrimination, persecution, and cleansing. Pull factors include prospects of upward mobility as well as joining relatives abroad.

== Christian emigration from the Middle East ==
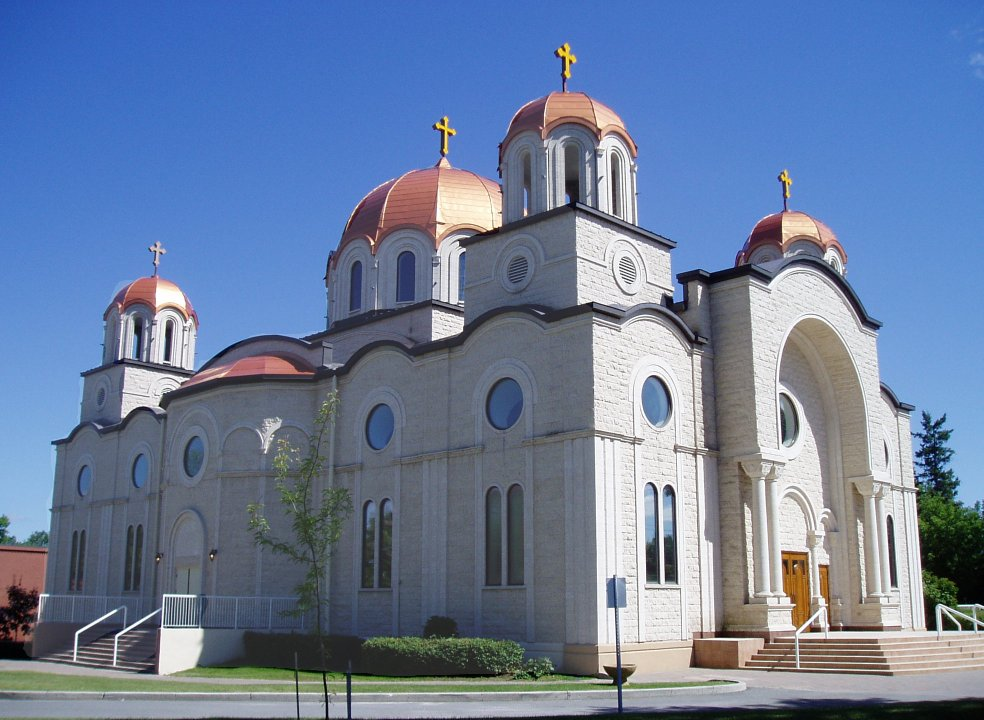
Antiochian Orthodox church in Canada; Christian communities make up a significant proportion of the Middle Eastern diaspora.

Millions of people descend from Arab Christians and live in the Arab diaspora, outside the Middle East, they mainly reside in the Americas, but there are many people of Arab Christian descent in Europe, Africa and Oceania. The majority of Arabs living outside the Arab World are Arab Christians. Christians have emigrated from the Middle East, a phenomenon that has been attributed to various causes included economic factors, political and military conflict, and feelings of insecurity or isolation among minority Christian populations. The higher rate of emigration among Christians, compared to other religious groups, has also been attributed to their having stronger support networks available abroad, in the form of existing emigrant communities.

Christians had a significant impact contributing the culture of the Arab world, Turkey, and Iran. Today Christians still play important roles in the Arab world, and Christians are relatively wealthy, well educated, and politically moderate.

Historical events that caused large Christian emigration from the Middle East include: 1860 civil conflict in Mount Lebanon and Damascus, Armenian genocide, Greek genocide, Assyrian genocide, 1915–1918 Great Famine of Mount Lebanon, 1923 population exchange between Greece and Turkey, 1948 Palestinian expulsion and flight, 1956–57 exodus and expulsions from Egypt, Lebanese civil war, and the Iraq war.

=== Egypt ===
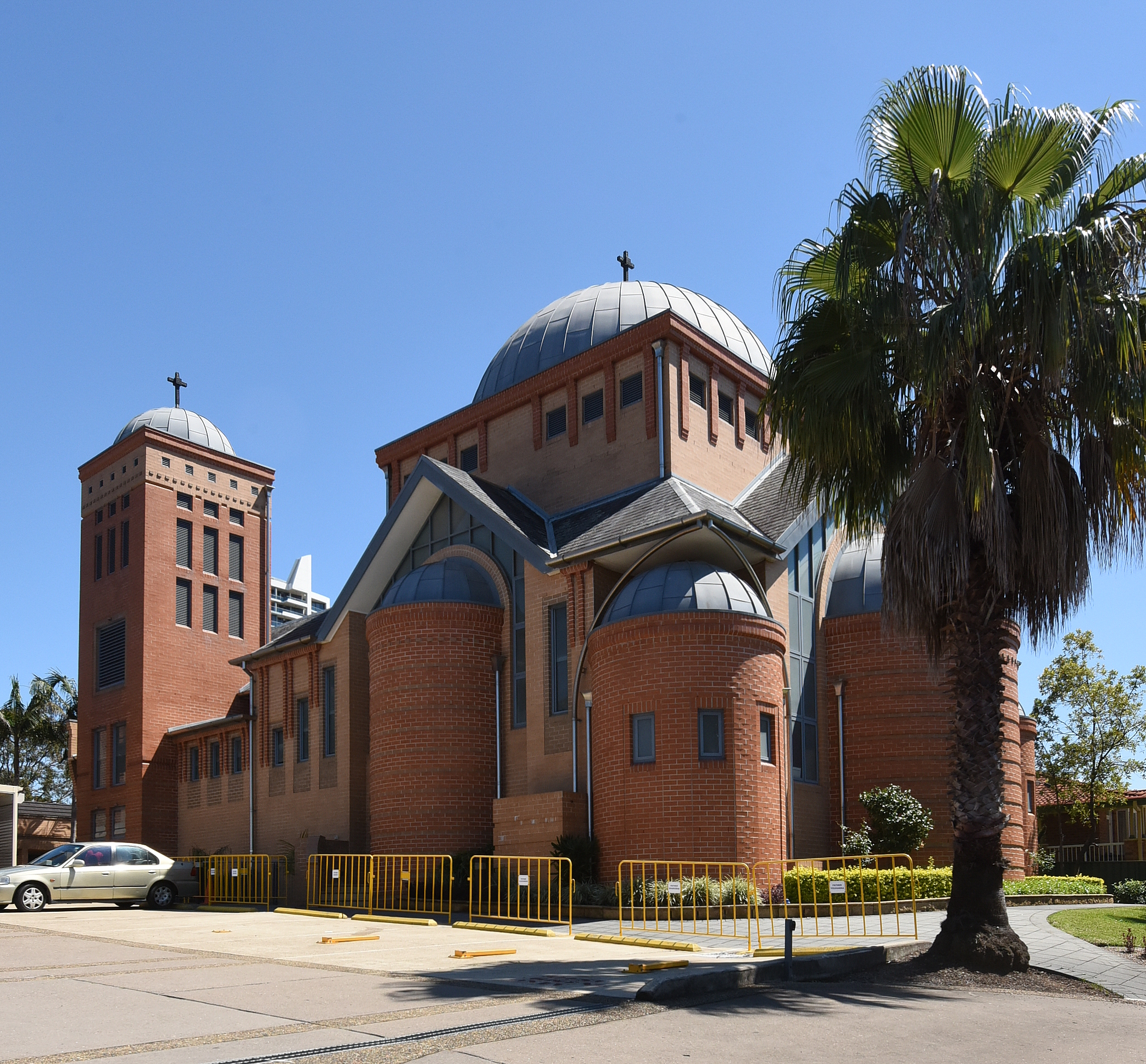
St Mary and St Merkorious Coptic Orthodox Church in Rhodes, Sydney.

As with most diaspora Arabs, a substantial proportion of the Egyptian diaspora consists of Christians. The Copts have been emigrating from Egypt both to improve their economic situation and to escape systematic harassment and persecution in their homeland.

The Coptic diaspora began primarily in the 1950s as result of discrimination, persecution of Copts and low income in Egypt. After Gamal Abdel Nasser rose to power, economic and social conditions deteriorated and many wealthier Egyptians, especially Copts, immigrated to The United States, Canada and Australia. 1956–1957 exodus and expulsions from Egypt was the exodus and expulsion of Egypt's Mutamassirun, which included the British and French colonial powers as well as Christian Greeks, Italians, Syro-Lebanese, Armenians. Emigration increased following the 1967 Arab-Israeli war, and the emigration of poorer and less-educated Copts increased after 1972, when the World Council of Churches and other religious groups began assisting Coptic immigration. Emigration of Egyptian Copts increased under Anwar al-Sadat (with many taking advantage of Sadat's "open door" policy to leave the country) and under Hosni Mubarak. Many Copts are university graduates in the professions, such as medicine and engineering. The new post-2011 migrants to the United States included both educated middle-class Copts and poorer, more rural Copt.

The number of Copts outside Egypt has sharply increased since the 1960s. The largest Coptic diaspora populations are in the United States, in Canada and in Australia, but Copts have a presence in many other countries.

=== Iran ===
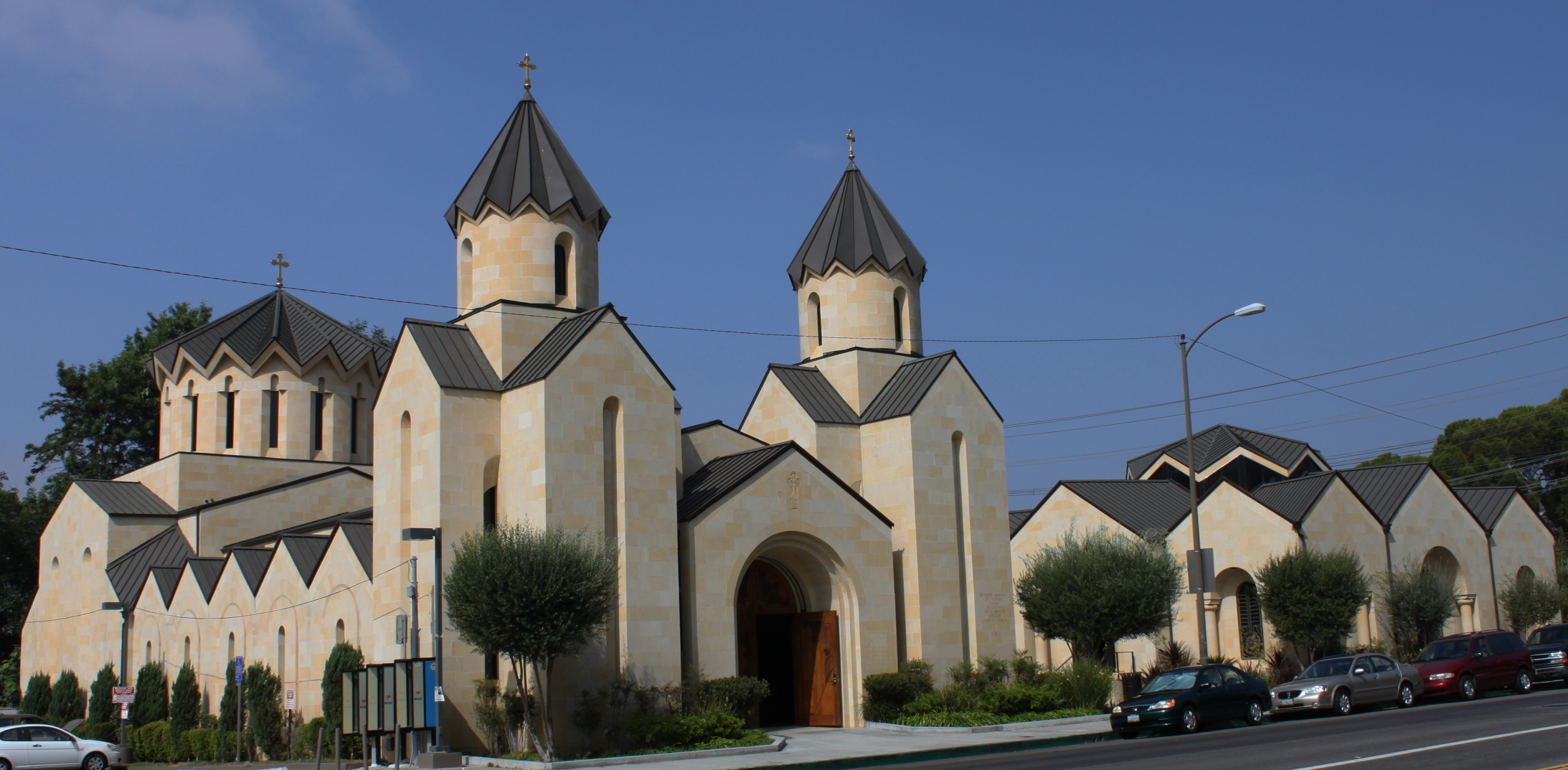
Saint Gregory the Illuminator Armenian Catholic Church in Glendale: home to large number of Armenian immigrants from Iran.

Christians and other religious minorities make up a disproportionately high share of the Iranian diaspora. Many Christians have left Iran since the Islamic Revolution of 1979.

The Assyrians residing in California and Russia tend to be from Iran. The Iranian revolution of 1979 greatly contributed to the influx of Middle Eastern Armenians to the US. The Armenian community in Iran was well established and integrated, but not assimilated, into local populations. Many lived in luxury in their former country, and more easily handled multilingualism, while retaining aspects of traditional Armenian culture.

The city of Glendale in the Los Angeles metropolitan area is widely thought to be the center of Armenian American life (although many Armenians live in the aptly named "Little Armenia" neighborhood of Los Angeles), there are also a great number of Armenian immigrants from Iran in Glendale who, due to the religious restrictions and lifestyle limitations of the Islamic government, immigrated to the US, many to Glendale since it was where their relatives resided.

=== Iraq ===
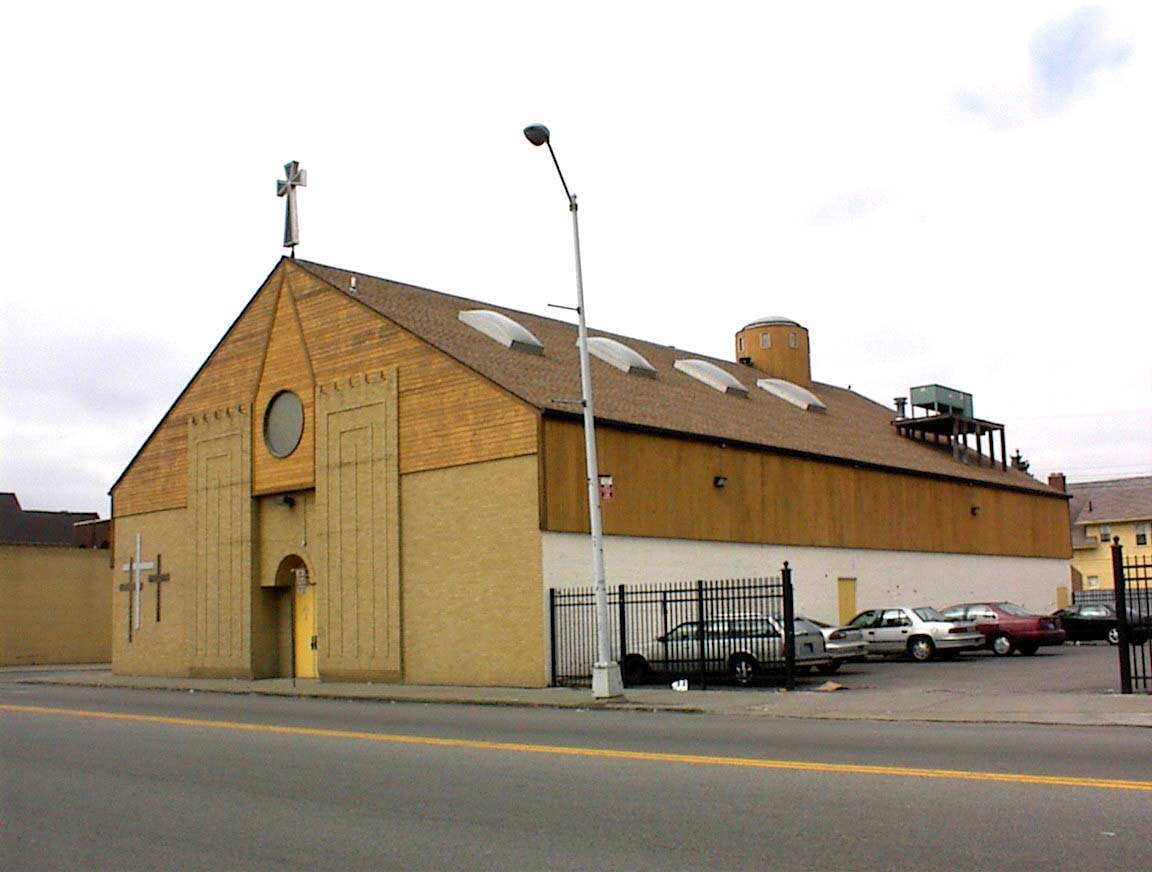
Sacred Heart Chaldean Church in Chaldean Town, Detroit: the city is home to a large Iraqi Chaldean Catholic community.

Following the Iraq War, the Christian population of Iraq has collapsed. Of the nearly 1 million Assyro-Chaldean Christians, most have immigrated to the United States, Canada, Australia and within some of the countries in Europe, and most of the rest concentrated within the northern Kurdish enclave of Iraqi Kurdistan. With continuing insurgency, Iraqi Christians are under constant threat of radical Islamic violence.

Since the United States-led invasion of Iraq in 2003 and the resulting breakdown of law and order in that country, many Syriac speaking Assyrians and other Christians have fled the country, taking refuge in Syria, Jordan and further afield. Their percentage of the population has declined from 12% in 1948 (4.8 million population), to 7% in 1987 (20 million) and 6% in 2003 (27 million). Despite Assyrians making up only 3% of Iraq's population, in October 2005, the United Nations High Commissioner for Refugees reported of the 700,000 Iraqis who took refuge in Syria between October 2003 and March 2005, 36% were "Iraqi Christians."

=== Lebanon ===
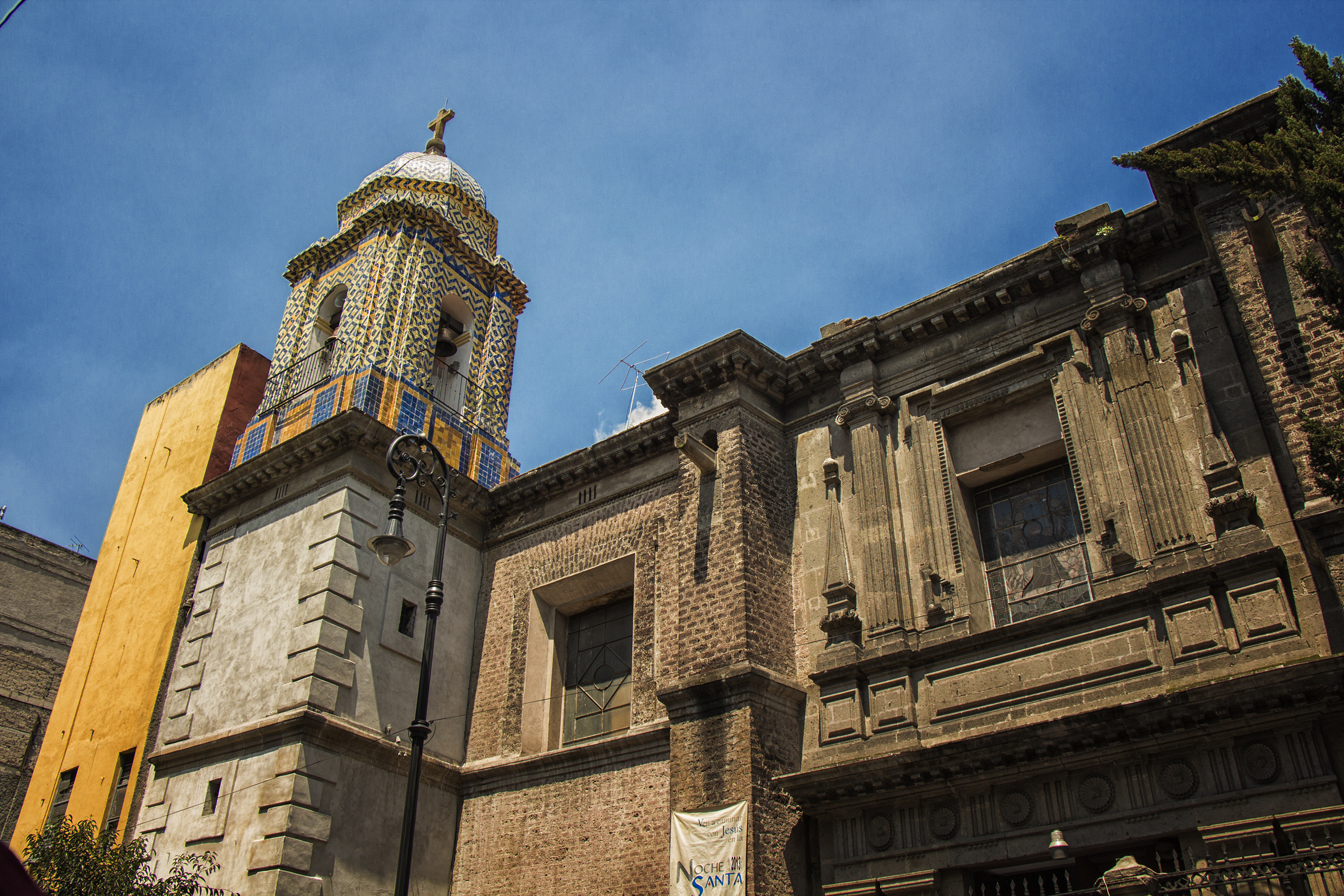
Maronite church in Mexico City: the city is home to a large Lebanese Christian community.

Lebanon has experienced a large migration of Lebanese Christians for many generations. Currently, the number of Lebanese people who live outside Lebanon (8.6-14 million), is higher than the number of Lebanese people who live within Lebanon (4.3 million). Most of the members of the diaspora population are Lebanese Christians, but some of them are Muslims, Druze and Jews. They trace their origins to several waves of Christian emigration, starting with the exodus that followed the 1860 Lebanon conflict in Ottoman Syria.

Under the current Lebanese nationality law, diaspora Lebanese do not have an automatic right of return to Lebanon. Due to varying degrees of assimilation and a high number of interethnic marriages, most diaspora Lebanese have not taught their children to speak the Arabic language, but they still retain their Lebanese ethnic identity.

The Lebanese Civil War has further fed the higher Christian emigration rate. Higher Muslim birthrates, the presence of Palestinians in Lebanon and the presence of Syrian migrant workers have all contributed to the reduction of the Christian proportion of the Lebanese population. Lebanese Christians are still culturally and politically prominent, forming 35-40% of the population. Since the end of the Lebanese Civil War, Muslim emigrants have outnumbered Christians, but the latter remain somewhat over-represented compared to their proportion of the population.

=== Palestine and Israel ===
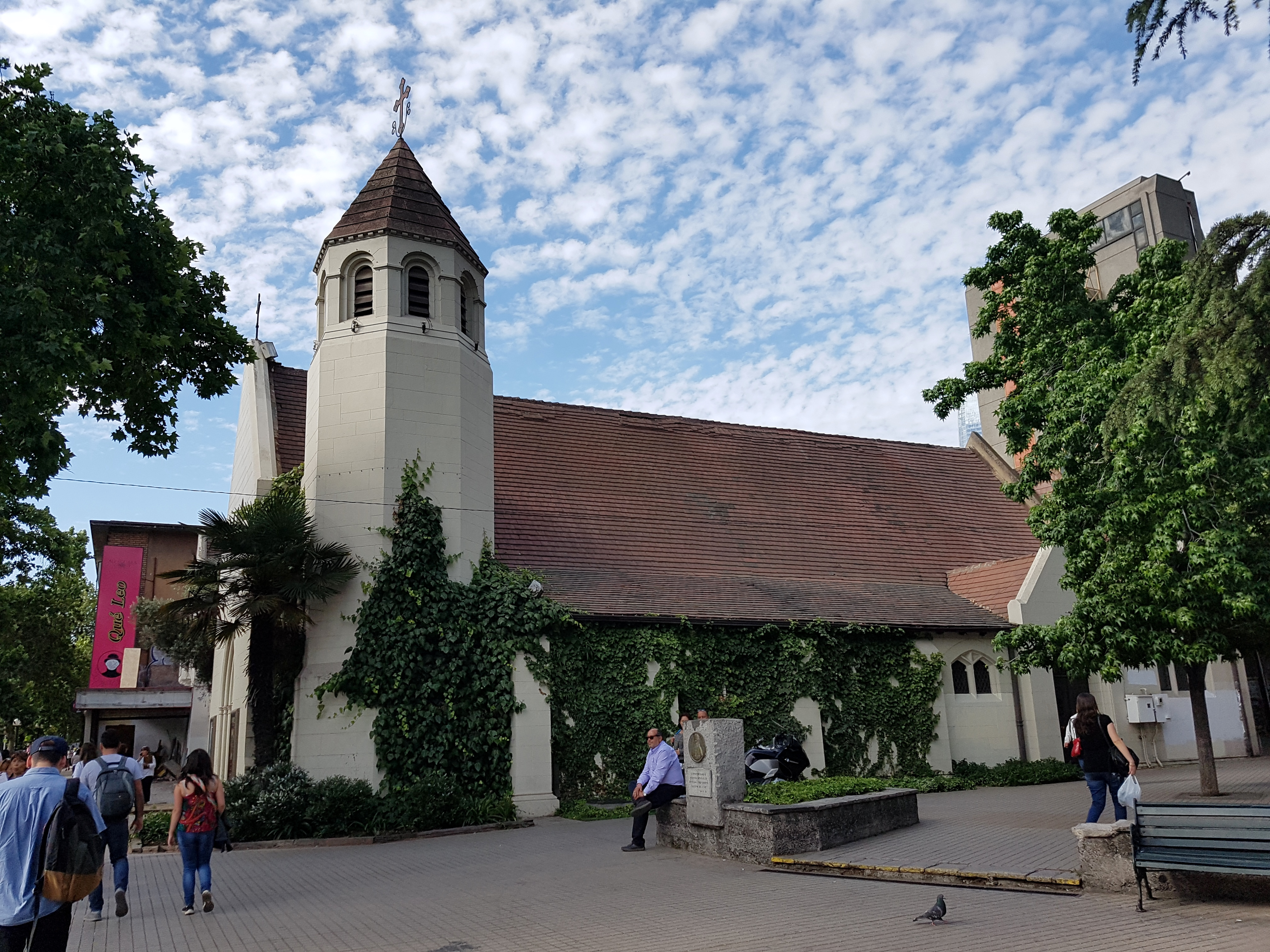
Antiochian Orthodox church in Santiago: Chile houses the largest Palestinian Christian community in the world outside of the Levant.

Economically driven migration of Palestinian Christians occurred in the 19th century during the Ottoman period. 1948 or nakba and 1967 occupations and wars made many Christians were expelled, fled or lost their homes due to Israel. There has been considerable emigration of Palestinians and Palestinian Christians are disproportionately represented within the Palestinian diaspora. Many Gazan Christians have fled the Gaza Strip as a result of conflict, largely relocating to the West Bank.

There are also many Palestinian Christians who are descendants of Palestinian refugees from the post-1948 era who fled to Christian-majority countries and formed large diaspora Christian communities. Worldwide, there are around one to four million Palestinian Christians in these territories as well as in the Palestinian diaspora, comprising around 6–30% of the world's total Palestinian population. Palestinian Christians live primarily in Arab states surrounding historic Palestine and in the diaspora, particularly in Europe and the Americas.

Today, Chile houses the largest Palestinian Christian community in the world outside of the Levant. Over 450,000 Palestinian Christians reside in Chile, most of whom came from Beit Jala, Bethlehem, and Beit Sahur. Also, El Salvador, Honduras, Brazil, Colombia, Argentina, Venezuela, and other Latin American countries have significant Palestinian Christian communities, some of whom immigrated almost a century ago during the time of Ottoman Palestine.

=== Syria ===
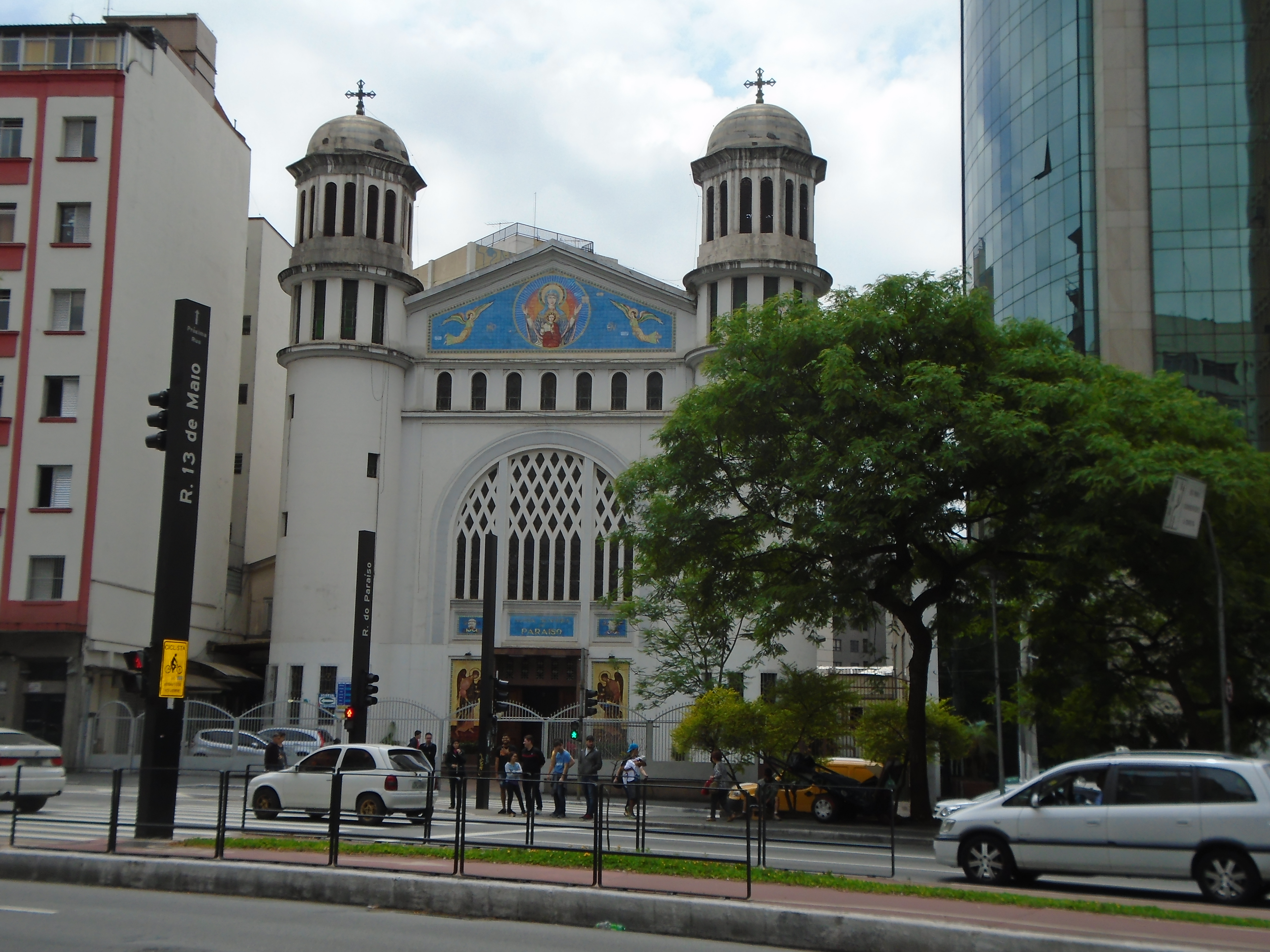
Melkite Greek Catholic Church in São Paulo: the city is home to a large Syrian-Lebanese Christian community.

There are almost as many Syrian people living outside of Syria (15 million), as within (18 million). Most of the diaspora population is Syrian Christians. They trace their origin to several waves of Christian emigration, starting with the exodus during Ottoman Syria. Syrian Christians tend to be relatively wealthy and highly educated.

Under the current nationality law, diaspora Syrians do not have an automatic right of return to Syria. Varying degrees of assimilation and the high degree of interethnic marriages caused most diaspora Syrians have not passed on Arabic to their children, but they still maintain a Syrian ethnic identity.

The eruption of the Syrian Civil War in 2011 caused Christians to be targeted by militant Islamists and so they have become a major component of Syrian refugees.

In FY 2016, when the US dramatically increased the number of refugees admitted from Syria, the US let in 12,587 refugees from Syria, with 99% being Muslims (few Shia Muslims were admitted). Less than 1% were Christian, according to the Pew Research Center analysis of the State Department Refugee Processing Center data.

The religious affiliation of Syria's 17.2 million people in 2016 was approximately 74% Sunni Islam, 13% Alawi, Ismaili and Shia Islam, 10% Christian and 3% Druze. The population has declined by more than 6 million because of the civil war.

=== Turkey ===
Originally, most emigrants from what is now Turkey were Christian subjects of the Ottoman Empire, including Greek refugees. Today, emigration from Turkey consists primarily of Muslims.

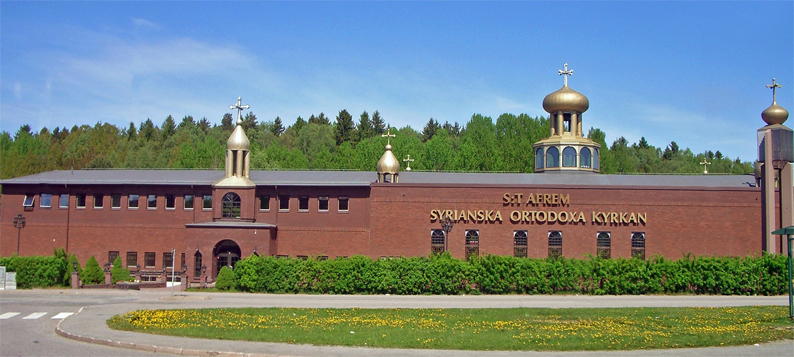
St. Aphrem Cathedral, Södertälje; the city is home to a large Syriac community, mostly from Tur Abdin.

The percentage of Christians in Turkey fell from 19% (possibly 24% because of Ottoman underestimates) in 1914 to 2.5% in 1927, due to events which significantly impacted the country's demographic structure, such as the Armenian genocide, the massacre of 500,000 Greeks, the massacre of 375,000 Assyrian Christians, the population exchange between Greece and Turkey, and the emigration of Christians (such as Levantines, Greeks, Armenians etc.) to foreign countries (mostly in Europe, the Americas, Lebanon and Syria) that actually began in the late 19th century and gained pace in the first quarter of the 20th century, especially during World War I and after the Turkish War of Independence. Ottoman censuses underestimated the number of Christians, which was really close to 24.5% of the entire population, 4.3 million, not 3 million, as was reported. The decline is mainly due to the Armenian genocide, the Greek genocide, the Assyrian genocide, the population exchange between Greece and Turkey and the emigration of Christians that began in the late 19th century and gained pace in the first quarter of the 20th century.

Emigration continued to occur in the 1980s, as Assyrian communities fled from the violence which was engulfing Tur Abdin during the Kurdish–Turkish conflict. Today, more than 160,000 people of different Christian denominations represent less than 0.2% of Turkey's population, Today, more than 200,000-320,000 people who are members of different Christian denominations live in Turkey, they make up roughly 0.3-0.4 percent of Turkey's population.

== Christian emigration from Maghreb ==
Prior to independence, Algeria was home to 1.4 million pieds-noirs (ethnic French who were mostly Catholic), Morocco was home to half a million Christian Europeans (mostly of Spanish and French ancestry), Tunisia was home to 255,000 Christian Europeans (mostly of Italian and Maltese ancestry), and Libya was home to 145,000 Christian Europeans (mostly of Italian and Maltese ancestry). There are also Christian communities of Berber or Arab descent in Greater Maghreb, made up of persons who converted mostly during the modern era, or under and after French colonialism. Due to the exodus of the pieds-noirs and other Christian communities in the 1960s, more North African Christians of Berber or Arab descent now live in France than in Greater Maghreb.

== Christian emigration from South Asia ==
=== India ===
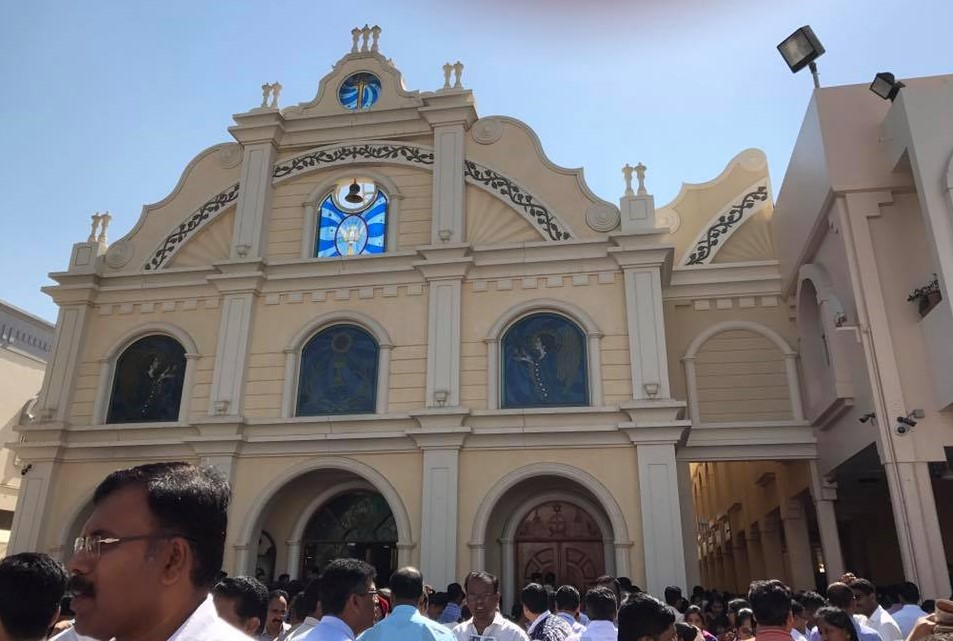
Indian Malankara Orthodox Syrian Church in Sharjah, United Arab Emirates.

Christians have also migrated from India but for their own reasons and in small numbers.

For instance in India, Christians comprise 2.2% of the population of India. In 2011, Christians represented 16% of the total people of Indian origin in Canada. According to the 2011 Census, Christians represented 10% of the total people of Indian origin in the United Kingdom. According to 2014 Pew Research Center research, 18% of Indian Americans consider themselves Christian (Protestant 11%, Catholic 5%, other Christian 3%).

=== Pakistan ===
Christians have also fled Pakistan, especially in response to the application of Islamic blasphemy laws.

== Christian emigration from East Asia ==
=== China ===
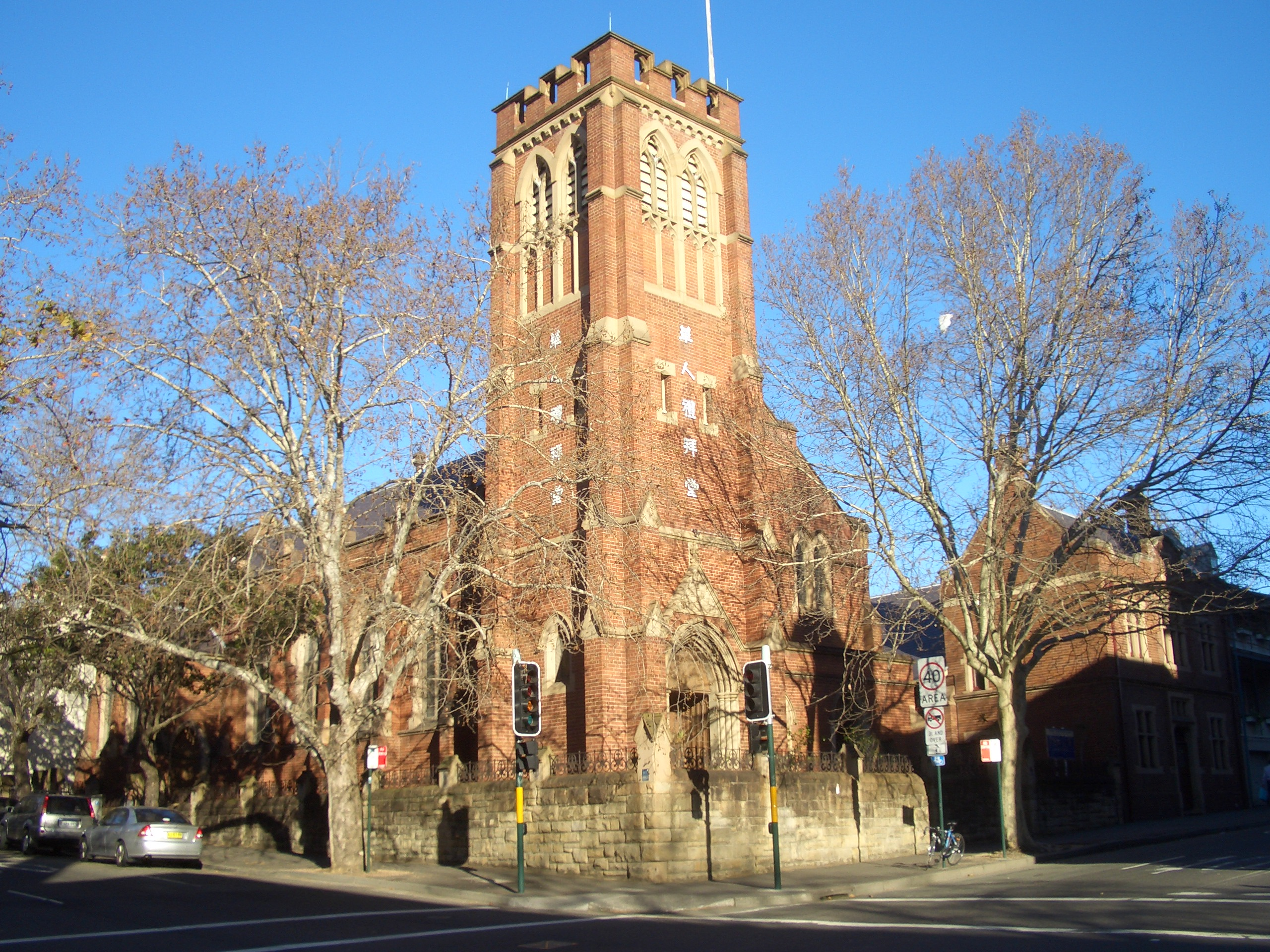
Chinese Presbyterian Church; the church is reputedly the oldest surviving Chinese church in Australia.

Christians have also fled China, especially in response to waves of religious persecution has been a contributory factor in emigration from China since it's a self-proclaimed communist state, and its declared state atheism.

There is a significantly higher percentage of Chinese Christians in the United States than there is in China, as a large amount of Chinese Christians fled and are still fleeing to the United States under Communist persecution. According to the Pew Research Center's 2012 Asian-American Survey, 30% of Chinese Americans aged 15 and over identified as Christians (8% were Catholic and 22% belonged to a Protestant denomination).

=== North Korea ===
Christians have also fled from North Korea, especially in response to waves of religious persecution. The persecution of Christians in North Korea has contributed to their emigration because North Korea's government is a self-proclaimed communist state, and one of the guiding principles of its official ideology of Juche is state atheism.

== See also ==
- After Saturday Comes Sunday
- Crypto-Christianity
- Diaspora politics
- Muhajir (disambiguation)
- Persecution of Christians
- Pieds-noirs
- Religious cleansing
- Christian population growth
- Demographics of Christianity
- History of Christianity
