= Arab Detroit =

Aspect of culture

- First edition cover
- Editor: Nabeel Abraham and Andrew Shryock
- Publisher: Wayne State University Press
- Publication date: 2000
- ISBN: 978-0-814-32812-5

Arab Detroit: From Margin to Mainstream is a book published by Wayne State University Press in 2000, edited by Nabeel Abraham and Andrew Shryock. It discusses the Arab population in Metro Detroit.

The book's subtitle refers to the question of whether Arabs in Metro Detroit have joined the mainstream American culture and society or whether they are still marginalized.

== Background ==
Arab Detroit originated from Creating a New Arab World: A Century in the Life of the Arab Community in Detroit, a 1994 project of the National Endowment for the Humanities (NEH). The editors are anthropologists, and Abraham, a Palestinian American, has a father from Bayt Hanina and a mother from Jerusalem. Of the 25 authors, among them immigrants and scholars, many had lived and/or worked in the Arab community of Detroit and therefore had personal ties there.

== Contents ==
The volume includes over 30 essays, articles, poems, and memoirs. If the introductions are included, there are a total of 39 entries. They are divided into six sections, each with an introduction: Qualities/Quantities, Work, Religion, Politics, Life Journeys, and Ethnic Futures. While each section has a theme, certain themes cross-over into different sections. The editors wrote the introductions.

Victoria Bernal of University of California, Irvine wrote that many of the essays are personal reflections, and a reader may not understand the personal context. Therefore, she recommended reading the final section of the book, "Family Resemblances: Kinship and Community in Arab Detroit" by Shryock, first. Bernal stated that non-specialists, including university undergraduates, would easily understand the book due to a lack of jargon.

== Reception ==
Bernal wrote that the book "has accomplished an important task in laying the groundwork for future studies of Arab communities in Detroit and elsewhere in America." Bernal argued that many readers may not understand the wider context of the Arab experience since so much material is related to individual families. She also stated that the editors rarely discuss reasons why Americans may be hostile to Arabs, and that the "culture of racism" of the term "Americanization", used in the book "as if this was unproblematic", was not examined.

James Goode of Grand Valley State University wrote that the book's editors "have made an important contribution to immigrant studies, while providing a work that is easily accessible to the general public."

Garbi Schmidt of the Danish National Institute of Social Research wrote that Arab Detroit "is a book well worth reading". Schmidt argued that in some cases the authors did not adequately explain their perspectives and choices of subjects, and he also stated that the book should have explored inter-ethnic relations within the Muslim community.

Sridevi Menon of Bowling Green State University wrote that the book is "an exceptional portrait of a vibrant "ethnic" community."

Khaled Mattawa of the Michigan Quarterly Review stated that overall book "is essential reading for anyone interested in Arab American social dynamics and in ethnic America in general." He suggested that the book should have only used a "discursive" amount of poetry rather than simply more poetry. In regards to the essays, he had a positive reception to those by the editors, with the memoirs by Abraham having "the makings for one of the best Arab American autobiographies in quite some time." He also had positive reception to essays by Sally Howell, William and Yvonne Lockwood, Alixa Naff, Anne Rasmussen, and Kim Schopmeyer: he argued that Schopmeyer's, a demographic study, is, like many other studies of demography, "informative if at times plodding". He had a negative reception to the essays by Linda Walbridge's and T. M. Aziz, and by Sharkey Haddad; he said that the former, "reads more like a lament than an analysis of" the refugee Iraqi Shias, while the latter, about Chaldo-Assyrians, "is badly written and full of generalizations".
