= Greenfield Union School =

- U.S. National Register of Historic Places
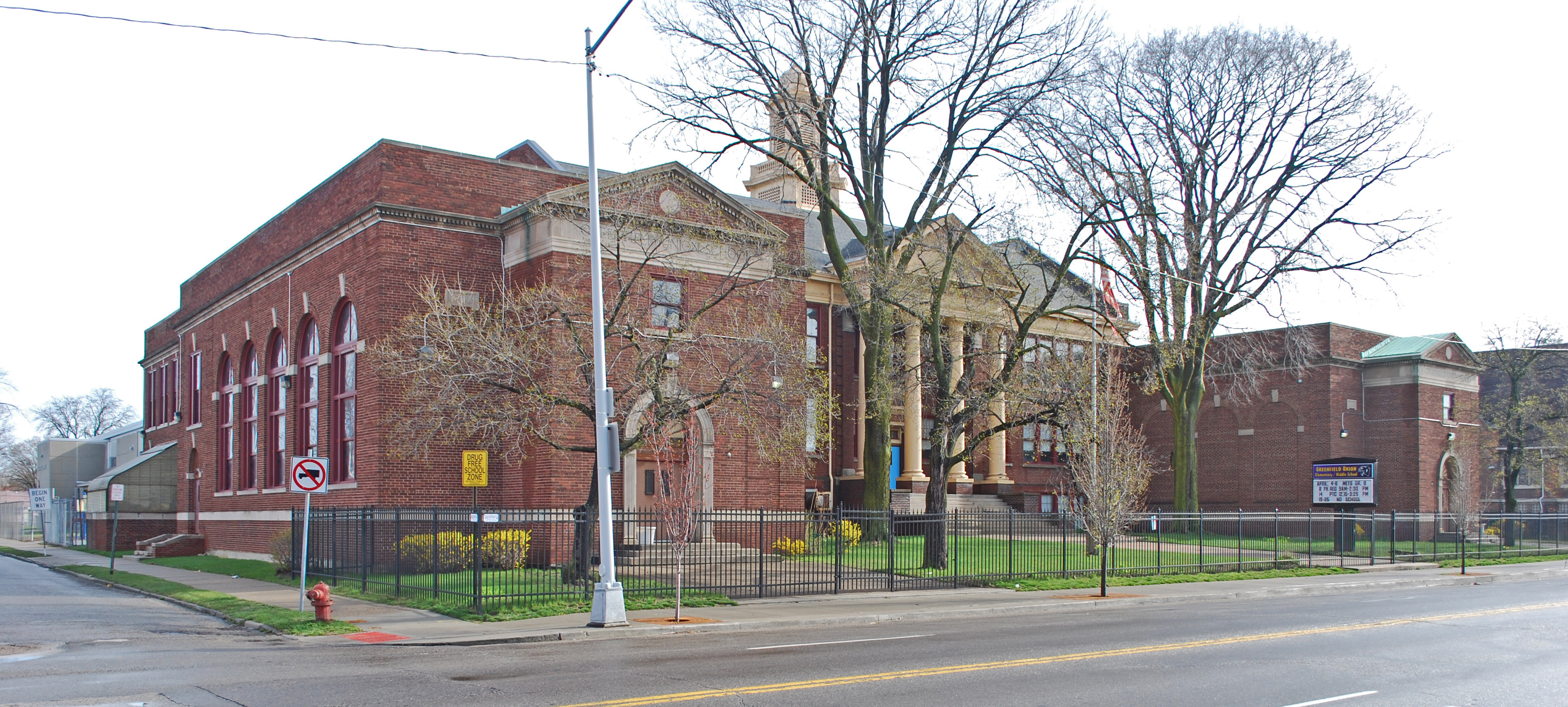

- Location within Michigan Location within the United States
- Interactive map
- Location: 420 West 7 Mile Road; Detroit, Michigan
- Coordinates: 42°25′57″N 83°06′28″W
- Area: 1 acre (0.40 ha)
- Built: 1913-{{end date|1916}
- Architect: Van Leyen, Schilling & Keough
- Architectural style: Georgian Revival
- MPS: Public Schools of Detroit MPS
- NRHP reference No.: 10000662
- Added to NRHP: March 29, 2011

The Greenfield Union School is a school located at 420 West 7 Mile Road in Detroit, Michigan. A part of Detroit Public Schools (DPS), the school building was listed on the National Register of Historic Places in 2011.

== History ==
Greenfield Union School was built by Greenfield Township for its District #1. The school was designed by Van Leyen & Schilling, and construction began in 1914. The school was completed in 1916 at a cost of $40,000, and the school opened its doors to elementary through high school students. That same year, Greenfield Township was annexed by the city of Detroit. As more residents moved to the area, the school became too crowded. High school students were transferred to other buildings, and in 1931, an addition containing several classrooms, an auditorium, and a gymnasium was constructed. This addition was also designed by Van Leyen & Schilling. In 1944, middle school students were also transferred. In 1971, another addition was constructed. An addition for early childhood learning was built in 2002.

As of 2011, the school is used by the Detroit Public Schools for elementary and middle school students. The school serves Chaldean Town.

== Architecture ==
The core block of the Greenfield Union School, constructed in 1914-1916, is a tall, rectangular, side-gabled, Georgian Revival red brick structure on a high basement. The front of the building has a full-height tetra style entry portico, styled in the Corinthian order and topped with a triangular pediment. A denticulated cornice wraps around the entire building. The entry doors beneath the portico are reached by a flight of several steps. The windows in this building consist of three large, separate openings on each floor in the center bay, and a grouping of four multi-light windows on each floor on the flanking bays.

Two Georgian Revival wings, built in 1931, flank the main block of the school, giving it an overall H-shaped plan. These wings are identical, brick, flat-roofed structures. The side elevations of each wing features two-story, round-arched windows. A single-story 1971 addition is connected to the rear of the building.

The interior of the school features an entry vestibule beyond the main doors, leading to a corridor housing administrative offices. Stairs on either side of the corridor lead upwards to classrooms, and to the two-story gymnasium wing (to the west) and the two-story auditorium (to the east). The gymnasium has tall Palladian windows with wood trim and exposed masonry walls. The auditorium contains a stage with decorative plaster trim, with a relief framing the windows wrapping to the rear of the auditorium. The original kindergarten room is now the library, and contains a protruding bay window with wood seats below, as well as a fireplace with a decorative Pewabic tile surround and a drinking fountain niche with Pewabic tile on all three sides.

== Demographics ==
In 1994 about 65% of the students were of Arab origin, 30% were black, and 5% were non-Arab white. The school initiated a 20-day long summer program to improve Michigan Educational Assessment Program (MEAP) test scores and English ability, catering to Middle Eastern communities.

== See also ==
- National Register of Historic Places listings in Detroit, Michigan
