= Highland Park Mosque =

First mosque built in the United States

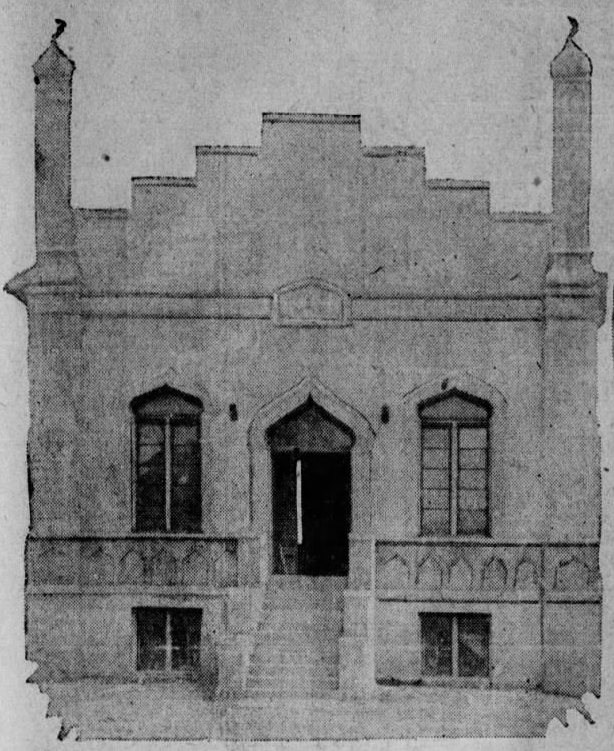
- The Highland Park Mosque depicted in 1924

- Location within Michigan

Religion
- Affiliation: Islam

Location
- Location: 242 Victor Street Highland Park, Michigan, United States
- Interactive map of Highland Park Mosque
- Coordinates: 42°24′33.1″N 83°05′21.0″W

Architecture
- Architect: Theodore Degenhardt
- Funded by: Mohammed Karoub
- Direction of façade: northeast

The Highland Park Mosque was one of the first mosques built in the United States, located in Highland Park, Michigan. It opened in 1921 but closed a few years later.

== Background ==
Mohammed Karoub immigrated to the United States in around 1912 from Damascus. He moved to the Detroit Metro area to work in the Highland Park Ford Plant, like many other Muslim immigrants. He then became a real estate developer and became prosperous. As a result of Highland Park's growing Muslim population, which was an estimated 16,000 at the time, Karoub used his money to purchase land for a mosque.

== History ==
Karoub employed architect Theodore Degenhardt to design the mosque, which, built near the Highland Park Ford Plant, served many of the Muslims working at the plant. It was reported that Karoub received funding for the mosque from "every section of the United States and from foreign lands." The mosque opened on June 8, 1921.

The mosque was subject to several issues. The Detroit Free Press reported in 1924 that the constant traffic and noise in the area made the location unsuitable for a mosque. The lack of sufficient funding may have also been a problem, and people had varying visions for how it should have been built. Due to the issues, Karoub sold the mosque to Highland Park in 1926.

As of 2016, the land is currently being used by the John E. Green Company, a mechanical contractor.
