= Nabeel Abraham =

American anthropologist and activist (born 1950)

- Born: 1950 (age 75–76); North Carolina, United States
- Education: University of Michigan

Nabeel Abraham (born 1950) is an American anthropologist and activist. His research focuses around Arab-Americans and how Arabs and Palestinians are represented in mainstream American media.

== Biography ==
Abraham was born in 1950 in North Carolina. His family moved to Detroit, Michigan, in 1955, where his father started a retail shop on Michigan Avenue. His family is originally from Palestine. Abraham attended Cass Technical High School. He earned bachelor's degrees in anthropology and sociology from Wayne State University. He earned his master's degree and doctorate in anthropology from the University of Michigan, Ann Arbor.

Abraham served as director of the Honors Program at Henry Ford Community College. He operated the program for 18 years, before an early retirement due to financial issues at the college. He worked at the college for 28 years.

He served as a columnist for Lies of Our Times until it ceased publishing in 1994 and also contributed to Middle East Report. He is the co-editor of Arab Detroit. He edited and contributed to Arab Detroit 9/11: Life in the Terror Decade. Released in 2011, the book won three awards: the Midwest Book Award, the Independent Publishers Book Award and the Choice Outstanding Academic Book Award.

His papers are held in the collection of the Bentley Historical Library at the University of Michigan. In 2016, Abraham was interviewed by the Detroit Historical Society regarding living as a teenage Arab-American in the 1960s in Detroit.

== Bibliography ==
- Kaldas, Pauline and Khaled Mattawa (editors). Dinarzad's Children: An Anthology of Contemporary Arab American Fiction. Fayetteville: University of Arkansas (2009). ISBN 1557289123.
