= Chaldean Town =

Neighborhood in Detroit, Michigan

Coordinates: 42.4322°N 83.1084°W

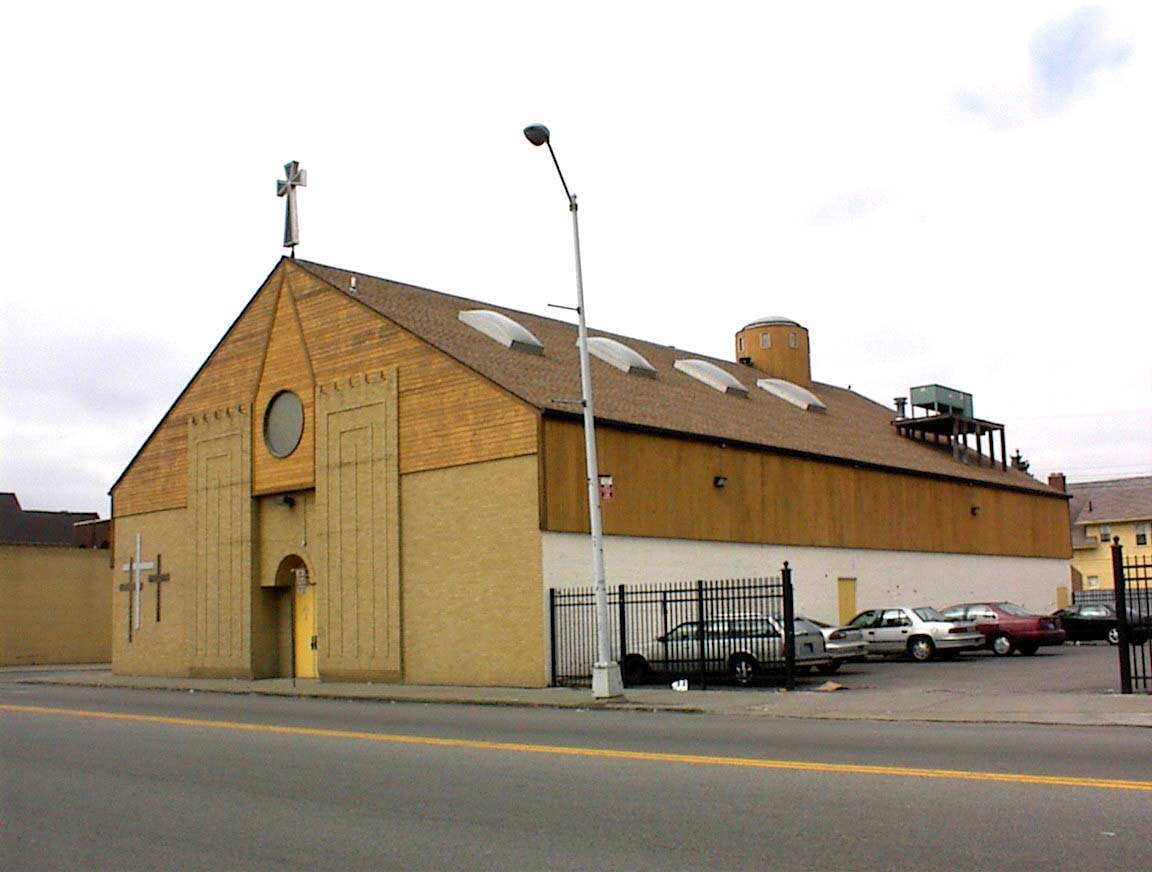
Sacred Heart Chaldean Catholic Church in Chaldean Town

Chaldean Town is a neighborhood in Wayne County in the U.S. state of Michigan. Located in the inner-suburbs of Detroit along West Seven Mile Road (between Woodward Avenue to the west and John R St. to the east), it has historically been home to Chaldo-Assyrian communities. Circa 2007 the population of the district was mainly low-income elderly people and recent immigrants, who were mostly made up of Chaldean Catholic Assyrians. The neighborhood was usually just a stop point for newly arrived immigrants, who then typically preferred to move to the suburbs of Detroit when they could afford to.

== History ==
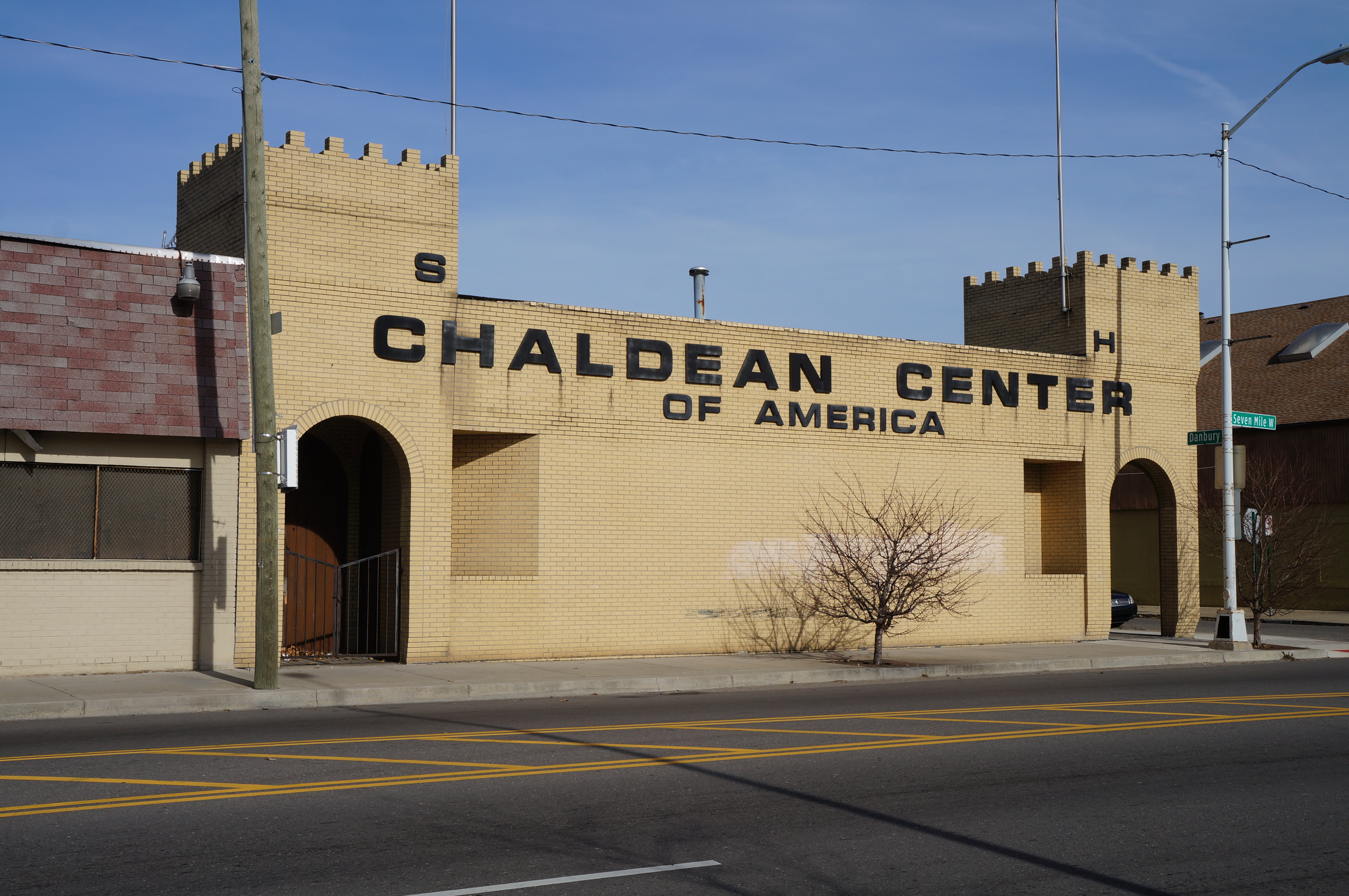
Chaldean Center of America

Chaldean Town was founded in the 1920s by Chaldean Catholic Assyrian immigrants from Turkey and Iraq (former Ottoman Empire) who wished to work in the automobile factories. After the 1967 Detroit riots and the downfall of the automobile industry, much of the area's wealthy residents and business owners left, leaving the Chaldeans with a monopoly over certain businesses such as grocery stores. Due to a stream of immigrants attracted to the already pre-established Chaldean community and the monopoly they had over certain industries, the neighborhood boomed in the 70s. Furthermore, the passage of the Immigration and Nationality Act of 1965 ended the United States' decades-old policy of limiting immigration based on nationality, thereby enabling an influx of Chaldeans to the neighborhood in the 1970s and onward. This law was followed up by the Refugee Act of 1980 to a similar effect. Consequently, the Middle Eastern population in Detroit increased from 70,000 to 92,000 between 1974 and 2004. After the 1970s the neighborhood suffered from crime and abandonment of property caused by the crack epidemic during the '80s and '90s - a fate common amongst Detroit neighborhoods. The residents now are typically only recent immigrants, business owners, and the elderly.

== Relations with the African American community ==
After the 1967 Detroit riot, white residents began to leave the city en masse, taking their businesses along with them. Chaldean retail and grocery stores rushed to fill the void, often popping up in poor, majority-black, inner-city neighborhoods where the residents had few alternatives for their food and shopping needs. Tensions between Chaldeans and African Americans were already high due to the looting of numerous Chaldean businesses in the '67 riots. In the following years, these tensions only escalated. On one hand, many African Americans complained that Chaldean store owners employed almost exclusively other Chaldeans, even though they operated in mostly black neighborhoods. African Americans' concerns were aggravated because, in many cases, Chaldean grocery stores were their only source of food for miles around. Similarly, many Chaldeans were frustrated with the high rates of crime in Detroit's inner-city neighborhoods, leading them to increase security in their stores. Ultimately, Chaldeans and African Americans in Detroit knew very little about one another, leading to a heightened distrust that was only amplified by the tense racial and political atmosphere in post-1967 Detroit.

The points of greatest contention between the Chaldean and African American communities in Detroit have been the frequent outbreaks of violence at Chaldean businesses. In 1980, James Douglass, a young black man, was murdered by two Chaldean brothers at their party store. A few months later, Nabil Zoma, a Chaldean store owner, was murdered in his shop by three black men in an attempted robbery. These killings angered Chaldeans and African Americans alike, even inspiring a small boycott of Middle Eastern businesses in Detroit. In 1999, Kalvin Porter, a 34-year-old-black man, was killed in a fight with two men of Middle Eastern descent outside a Chaldean-owned gas station. His death sparked intense debates between African American and Chaldean community leaders, even involving then-mayor Dennis Archer. Many African Americans were infuriated over Porter's murder, especially given that the two men responsible were acquitted one year later by a jury containing only one black juror. Nevertheless, cooler heads on both sides, including Archer, attempted to ward off further interracial conflict by insisting the killing was not racially motivated and instead should just be mourned as a tragedy by both African Americans and Chaldeans. Events similar to these have put African American-Chaldean relations in jeopardy numerous times since 1967, often prompting boycotts and protests, and sometimes prompting meaningful discussion between community leaders.

Despite ongoing quarrels between the two groups, there have also been many efforts on the part of African Americans and Chaldeans to bridge the gap separating their communities. For example, after the 1980 murders, Edward Deeb, the Chaldean American executive director of the Associated Food Dealers, and Walter Douglas, the African American president of New Detroit (a racial justice organization), founded a task force to prevent further conflict between the two groups. Although there were still substantial points of disagreement between Chaldean and African American members of the task force, its mere existence testifies to the fact that despite many grievances and ongoing tension, some members of both communities were pushing for greater unity all along. During the first Gulf War in 1991, when prejudice against Middle Easterners was at a high point nationwide, African Americans were some of the few to stick up for their Middle Eastern neighbors in Detroit. The NAACP reported receiving many calls that year from members expressing support for Chaldeans, who they viewed as coming under attack. In the following years, multiple similar initiatives came into being, including the Harmony Project, which was founded in 1995 by an African American activist, Toni McIlwain, to negotiate disputes between the two communities, and the Delta Sigma Theta sorority's solidarity event in 2001 that focused on increasing unity between African American Detroit residents and Chaldeans targeted by post-9/11 racial profiling.

== Relationship with Iraq ==
Around 1979, after Jacob Yasso, the reverend of the Sacred Heart Chaldean Church (Imperial Aramaic: ܥܕܬܐ ܕܠܒܗ ܕܡܪܢ ܕܟܠܕܝ̈ܐ, romanized: ʿēttāʾ d-lebbēh d-māran d-ḵaldāyēʾ) congratulated President Saddam Hussein on being appointed as the President of Iraq. In return, Saddam Hussein donated $250,000 to the Sacred Heart Chaldean Church.

== Economy ==
In 1999, the City of Detroit planned to create Chaldean Town as an entertainment center. It was officially designated as "Chaldean Town" in 1999. The area also has a multimillion-dollar housing development planned.

The neighborhood is currently suffering from urban decay. As of 2015, Chaldean Town has lost all but two of its Chaldean retail businesses, with only S&J Meats and Sullaf Restaurant remaining.

== Education ==
Residents are zoned to Detroit Public Schools. Residents are zoned to Greenfield Union Elementary-Middle School, and Pershing High School.

The Community Education Center, a government-funded center owned by Chaldeans, is located on Woodward Avenue in Chaldean Town, near Seven Mile. Asaad Yousif Kalasho founded the center. The teachers and most of the students are Chaldean. It provides free education.

== See also ==
- Assyrian American
- History of the Middle Eastern people in Metro Detroit
