= Sacred Heart Chaldean Church =

Church in Detroit, Michigan, United States

Coordinates: 42°25′56.9″N 83°06′21.6″W

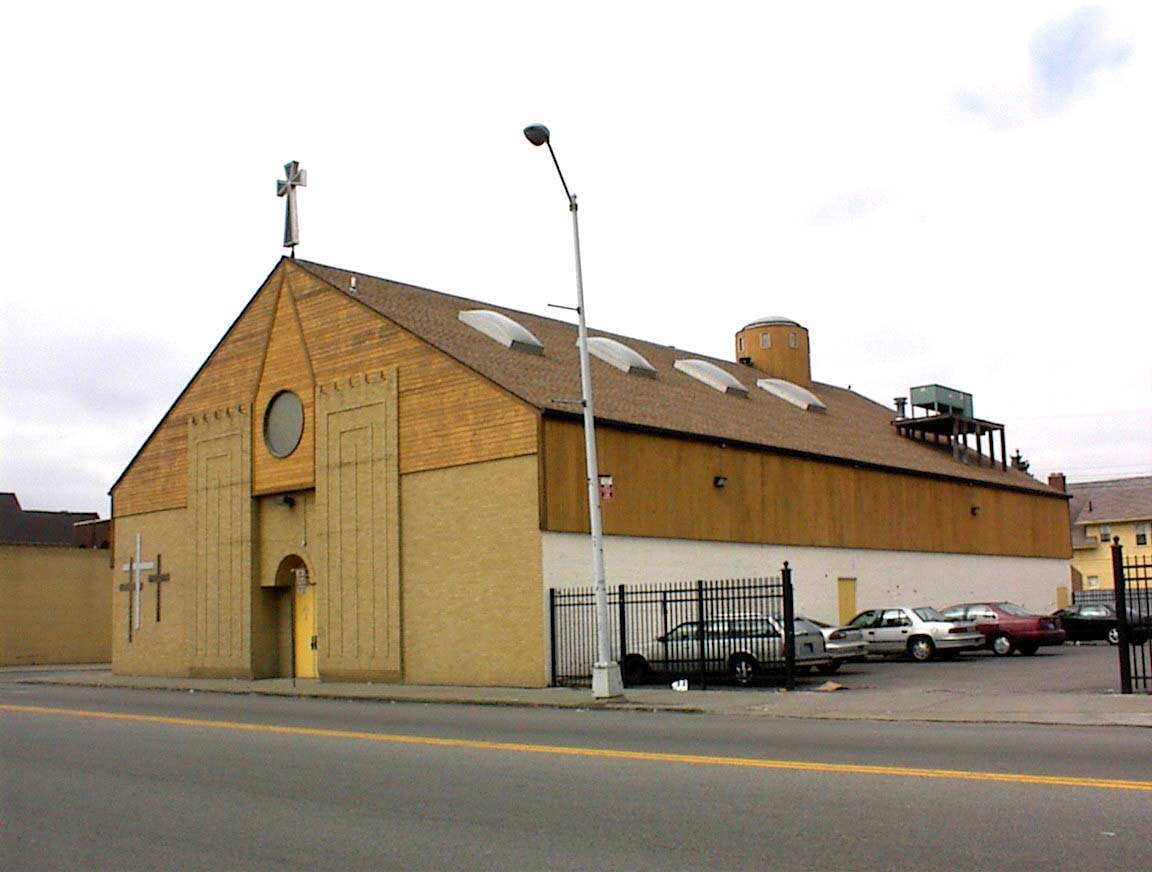
Sacred Heart Chaldean Catholic Church

The Sacred Heart Chaldean Church (Imperial Aramaic: ܥܕܬܐ ܕܠܒܗ ܕܡܪܢ ܕܟܠܕܝ̈ܐ, romanized: ʿēttāʾ d-lebbēh d-māran d-ḵaldāyēʾ) was a Chaldean Catholic church located in Chaldean Town, a neighborhood in Detroit on 7 Mile Road. It was built in 1975 using Assyrian Revival architecture. In 1979, Saddam Hussein, the then president of Iraq donated $250,000 to the church and was given the key to Detroit. The church’s pastor, Jacob Yasso, calls the former Iraqi president “a very generous, warm man who just let too much power go to his head". The church was closed in 2015, as the local Assyrian population was very thinned out, and so it moved to a new facility in Warren, Michigan as "Our Lady Of Perpetual Help". The building is being sold, with a "for sale" sign visible from a Google street view from October 2015. The "for sale" sign was removed from Google street view from November 2016 onwards.

The old and new churches are part of the Chaldean Catholic Eparchy of Saint Thomas the Apostle of Detroit.

== See also ==
- Chaldean American
- History of the Middle Eastern people in Metro Detroit
