= Islam in Metro Detroit =

Religion in the United States

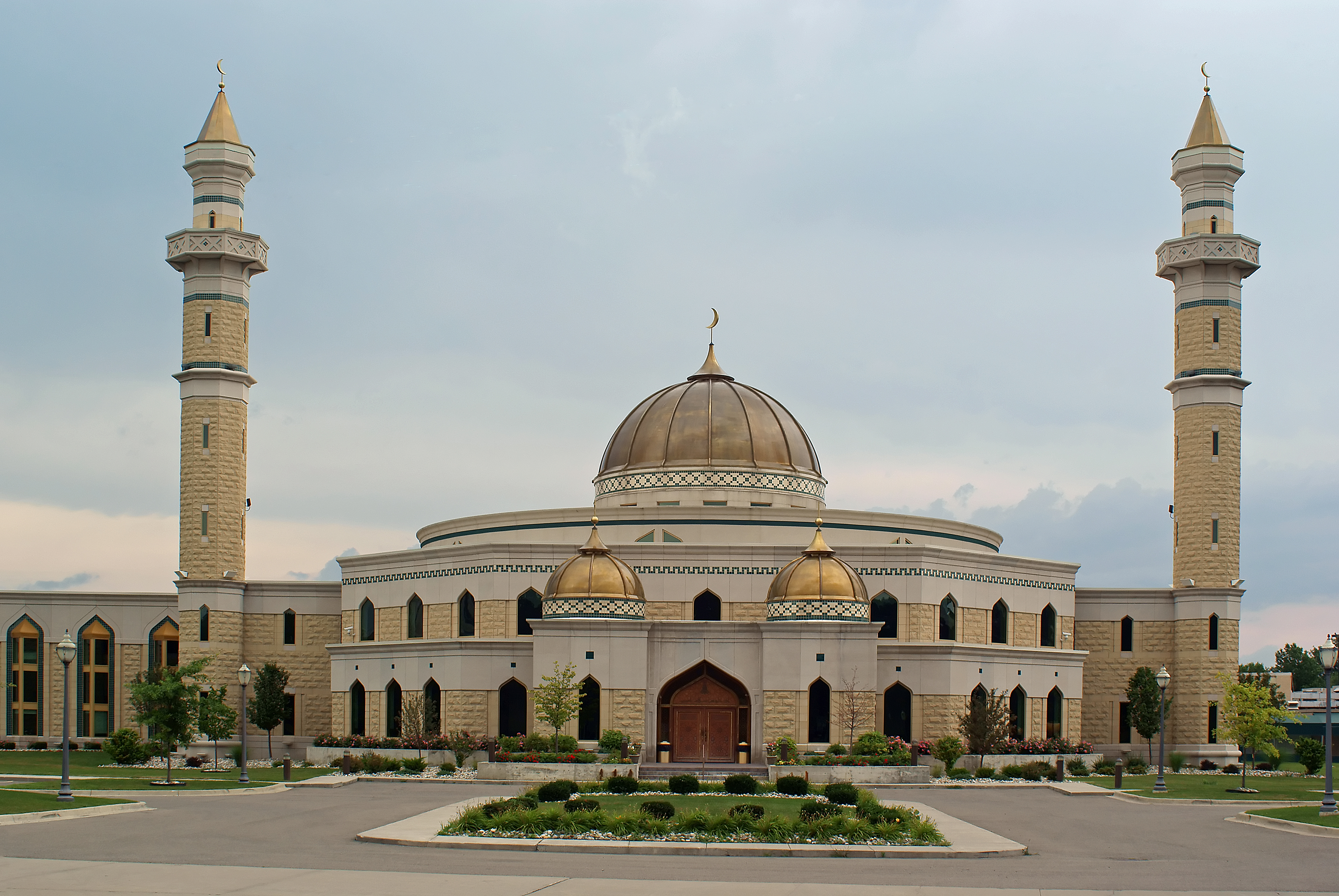
Islamic Center of America in Dearborn

Islam is practiced by several Muslim American groups in Metro Detroit.

== History ==
The first mosque in the city was the Highland Park Mosque, and the first imams who lived in Detroit were Kalil Bazzy and Hussein Adeeb Karoub. This first mosque failed in 1922. A multiethnic coalition founded the Universal Islamic Society (UIS), the city's second mosque, in 1925.

Early Muslim communities in Detroit "navigated turbulent periods of xenophobia, racism (anti-black and anti-Asian), Orientalist stereotyping, anti-Muslim prejudice, economic depression, and war." By the mid-20th century, however, Muslims in Detroit were seen as an upwardly mobile, modern group on "easy terms with American patriotism." During this time, while the first national organizations for the advancement of Muslim issues began to sprout up across the county, many Muslim activists and political and spiritual leaders began to rise to prominence in Detroit. The city was seen as "a harbinger of successful Muslim incorporation in American society... by Muslims and non-Muslims alike."

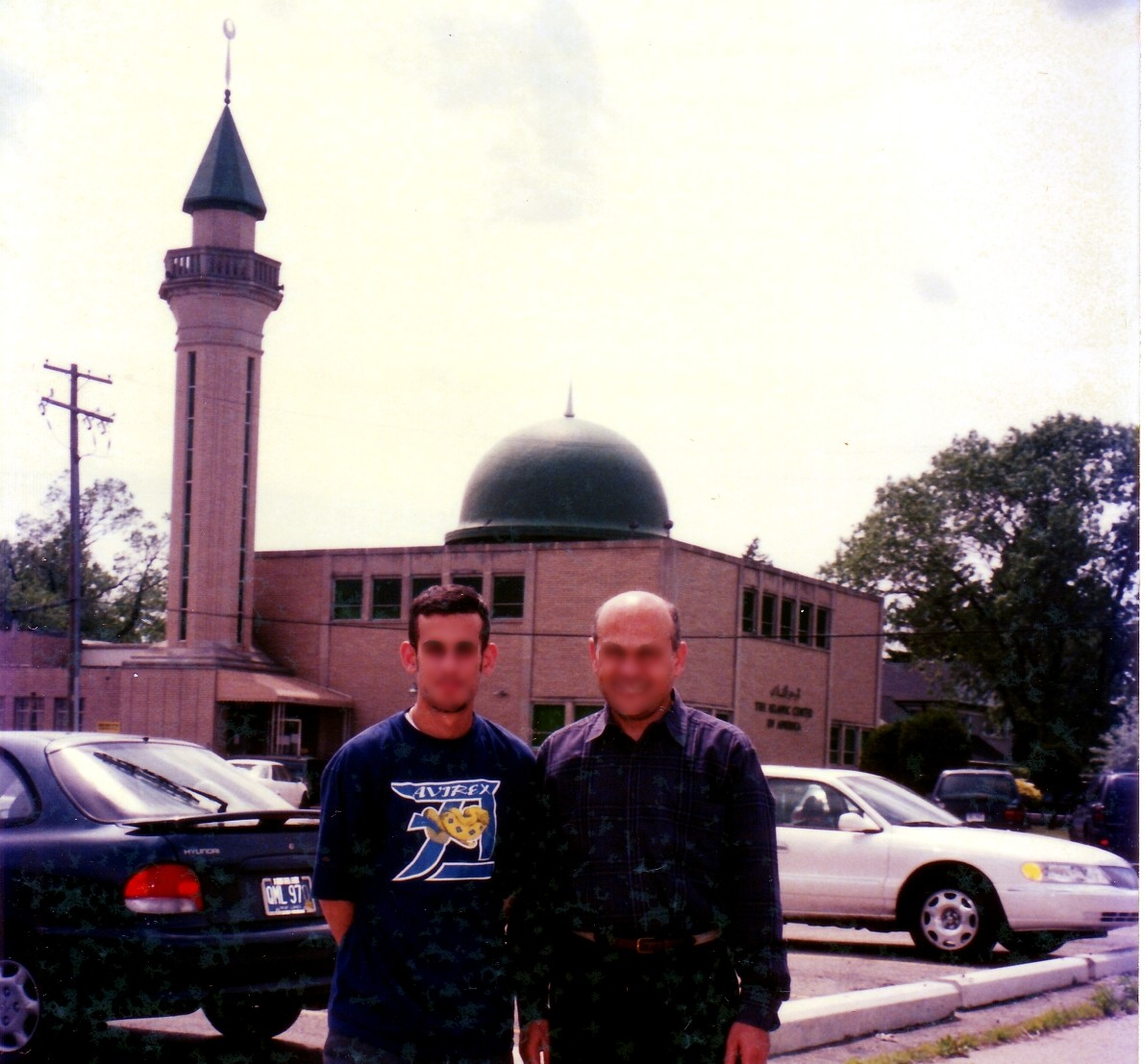
The Islamic Center of America original 1963 mosque in Detroit is pictured in the background in 2002.

The character changed in Detroit's Islam in the 1970s when the conversions of the members of the Nation of Islam to mainstream Islam took place, and when immigration from India, southern Lebanon, Pakistan, and Palestine occurred. B. D. Singleton of the California State University, San Bernardino wrote that the older Muslim population were often "marginalized or shut out of" institutions they themselves had created.

In the 2000s, a Bengali mosque in Hamtramck named the Al-Islah Jamee Masjid wanted permission to broadcast the adhan, the Islamic call to prayer, from loudspeakers outside of the mosque and requested this permission from the city government. It was one of the newer mosques in Hamtramck. Sally Howell, author of Competing for Muslims: New Strategies for Urban Renewal in Detroit, wrote that the request "brought to a head simmering Islamophobic sentiments" in Hamtramck. Muslims and interfaith activists supported the mosque. Some anti-Muslim activists, including some from other states including Kentucky and Ohio, participated in the controversy. Howell added that the controversy, through an "international media storm", gave "a cathartic test of the 'freedoms' we were said to be 'fighting for' in Afghanistan and Iraq" to the remainder of the United States. In 2004 the city council voted unanimously to allow mosques to broadcast the adhan on public streets, making it one of the few U.S. cities to allow this to occur. Some individuals had strongly objected to the allowing of the adhan.

In 2013, the city council of Hamtramck became the first in the U.S. that was Muslim majority.

By 2015, many Muslim women in the Detroit area asked to be able to wear hijab in public places and in any identification photographs. Several municipalities are having to determine how to deal with producing identification photographs of Muslim women who are under arrest.

By 2022, there were more tensions between the Muslim and LGBTQ voting groups in Dearborn and Hamtramck in regards to LGBTQ materials in schools. This was a political shift, in which Christian groups now courted Muslim groups which they previously opposed, in order to get more voters for politically conservative causes. On June 13, 2023, the Hamtramck City Council introduced a resolution prohibiting the display of flags representing "any religious, ethnic, racial, political, or sexual orientation group" on city property, which was widely considered a targeted ban on the rainbow flag. Following three hours of public comment, the Council passed the resolution unanimously. Mayor Amer Ghalib opposed displaying the pride flag, while former Mayor Karen Majewski had supported displaying the LGBT pride flag.

== Ethnic relations ==
The authors Abdo Elkholy, Frances Trix, and Linda Walbridge, all, as paraphrased by Sally Howell, stated that "relations between Albanian Muslims and other Muslims in Detroit were limited at best."

== Institutions ==
The Council on American-Islamic Relations (CAIR) has a Michigan chapter, headquartered in Southfield.

The leadership of CAIR-MI is headed by Executive Director Dawud Walid, alongside lead staff attorneys Amy Doukoure and Jad Salamey, while its Board of Directors includes Jukaku Tayeb, Thasin Sardar, Ihor Debryn, Tariq Hafeez, Eric R. Sabree, Mohammed Saleem, Muzammil Ahmed, and Haytham Obeid. As a 501(c)(3) nonprofit, CAIR-MI is legally barred from endorsing political candidates. However, as noted by researchers at InfluenceWatch, the organization frequently aligns with progressive, left-of-center coalitions on platforms concerning civil liberties, voting access, and racial justice. At the same time, CAIR-MI frequently collaborates with Arab-American and Muslim political action groups in Dearborn and Metro Detroit.

== Individual mosques ==
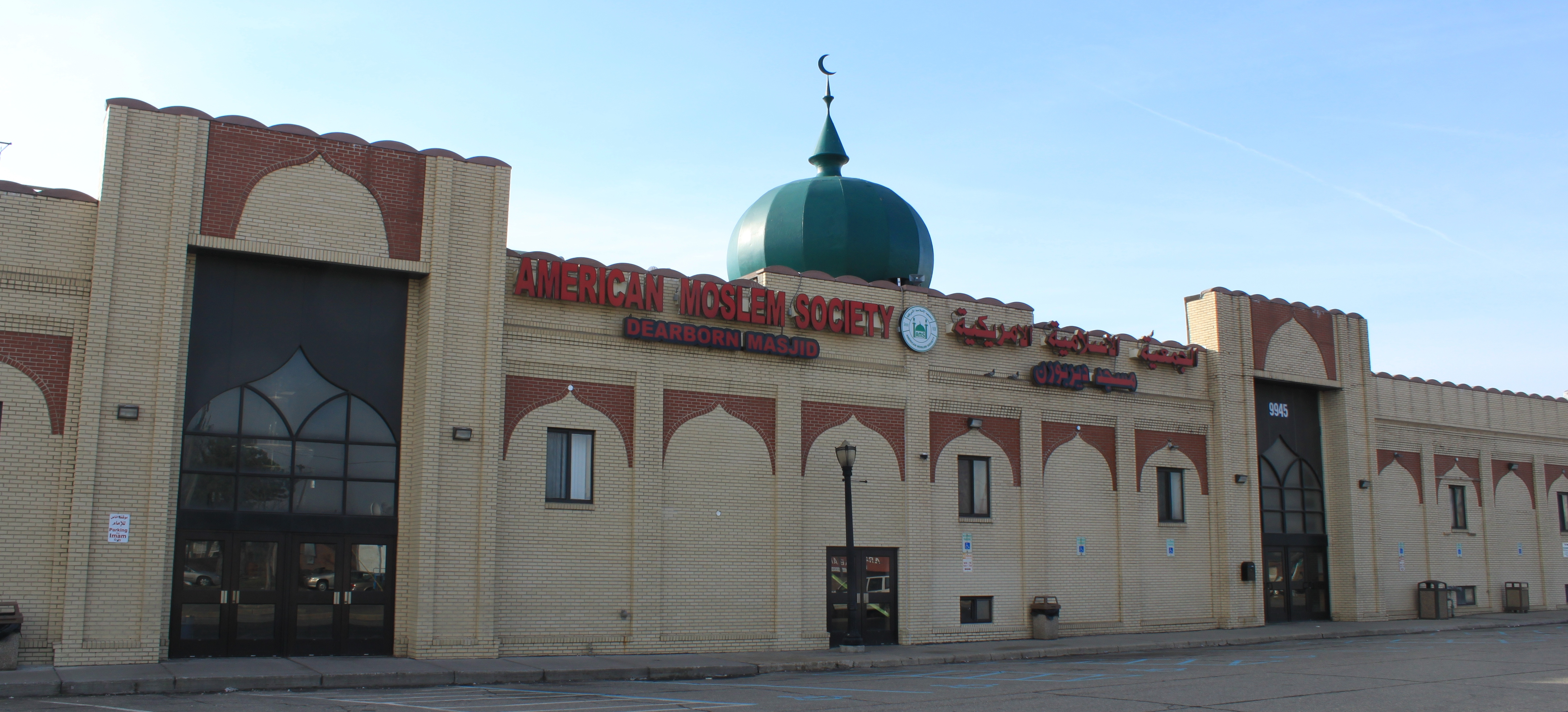
Dearborn Mosque

Mosques in Dearborn include the Islamic Center of America and the Dearborn Mosque. The First Albanian Bektashi Tekke in America serves the Albanian-American Bektashi Sufi community.

In Hamtramck the Bengali community has established mosques, including Al-Islah Jamee Masjid. In addition, in Hamtramck the Yemeni community established the Mu'ath bin Jabal Mosque (Arabic: مسجد معاذ بن جبل), which was established in 1976. In 2005 the mosque, located just outside the south eastern border of Hamtramck, was the largest mosque out of the ten within a three-mile radius.

The First Albanian Bektashi Monastery (Tekke) opened in Taylor in 1953. Baba Rexheb, an Albanian Sufi, had established it. In 1963, the Albanian Islamic Center in Harper Woods opened.

== Education ==
Islamic day schools in the Detroit area include:

- International Islamic Academy (IIA), Detroit – Formed in 2011 by the merger of Dar Alarqam School and Al Ihsan Academy
- Muslim American Youth Academy (MAYA) of the Islamic Center of America, Dearborn

As of 2015 Michigan Islamic Academy, a K–12 Islamic day school in Ann Arbor, has students who come from Metro Detroit.

=== Public schools ===
In a thirty-year period ending sometime prior to 2010 Dearborn Public Schools and Detroit Public Schools both developed policies to accommodate Arab and Muslim students in collaboration with administrators, parents, teachers, and students. Policies adopted by the districts included observances of Muslim holidays, Arabic-language programs, policies concerning prayer, and rules regarding modesty of females in physical education and sports. Since the early 1980s Dearborn district schools have vegetarian meals as alternative to non-halal meals. As of 2010 some schools use discretionary funds to offer halal meals, but most schools do not offer halal meals since they cannot get affordable prices from distributors.

In 2005 Highland Park Schools made plans to attract Arab and Muslim students resident in Detroit and Hamtramck. Dr. Theresa Saunders, the superintendent of the school system, hired Yahya Alkebsi (Arabic: يحيى الكبسي), a Yemeni-American educator, as the district's Arab Muslim consultant. It added Arabic-speaking teachers and began offering instruction in Arabic. Sally Howell, author of Competing for Muslims: New Strategies for Urban Renewal in Detroit, said that the district began treating "Muslim families more directly like consumers". Howell said that the district agreed "to segregate Muslim students from mainstream classrooms" but that the district routinely denied that this was the case. Alkebsi said that he would bring halal food to HPS schools, but he was unable to do so. The district instead had vegetarian options.

In 2022 there were political controversies in the district regarding LGBTQ materials in schools at Dearborn Public Schools. In 2022, there were protests that advocated for removing certain books and protests that advocated against districts removing such books. The district chose to discontinue holding seven titles. Much of the impetus against LGBTQ books was driven by conservative Muslim advocates, who were backed by conservative Christian advocates.

== Cuisine ==
The number of halal-certified restaurants in Metro Detroit grew from 89 in 2010 to 236 in 2014.

== Notable residents ==
Religious leaders:

- Hassan Al-Qazwini (Iraqi Shia Muslim)
- Baba Rexheb (Albanian Sufi Muslim)

Elected officials:

- Abdullah Hammoud (Michigan House of Representatives, 15th District, 2016–present)
- Rashida Tlaib (Michigan House of Representatives, 6th District, 2009–2014), (US House of Representatives, 13th District, 2019–present)

Other:

- Rima Fakih winner of the Miss USA and Miss Michigan pageants in 2010.

== See also ==
- Religion in Metro Detroit
- Interfaith Leadership Council of Metropolitan Detroit

Ethnic groups:

- History of the Middle Eastern people in Metro Detroit
- History of the Albanian Americans in Metro Detroit
