= The Shi'ites Under Attack =

The Shi'ites Under Attack (ISBN 0-942778-04-9) is a book written by Sh'ia Twelver Islamic scholar Muhammad Jawad Chirri, late founder and director of the Islamic Center of America. It responds to numerous accusations against the beliefs and practices of Shia Muslims, and includes discussions on the revelation of the Qur'an, Ibn Saba, and the companions of Muhammad.
