= First Albanian Bektashi Tekke in America =

Bektashi teqe in Taylor, Michigan

Albania-American Bektashi Tekke
- Albanian: Teqeja e Pare Bektashiane ne Amerike
- Location in Michigan First Albanian Bektashi Tekke in America (the United States)

Religion
- Affiliation: Islam
- Branch/tradition: Sufi
- Rite: Bektashi
- Ecclesiastical or organizational status: Tekke
- Leadership: Baba Eliton Pashaj
- Year consecrated: 1954
- Status: Active

Location
- Location: Taylor, Michigan
- Interactive map of Albania-American Bektashi Tekke
- Coordinates: 42°12′43″N 83°14′47″W

Architecture
- Type: Sufi Arts architecture
- Founder: Baba Rexheb
- Completed: 1954

Website
- albteqeusa.org

The Albania-American Bektashi Tekke (Albanian: Teqeja e Pare Bektashiane ne Amerike) is a Bektashi Sufi tekke located in Taylor, Michigan, in the United States. It was founded by Baba Rexheb, a Bektashi community leader who had immigrated to the United States from Albania. As the first Bektashi building founded in the United States, the teqe was consecrated on April 29, 1954.

== See also ==
- List of Bektashi tekkes and shrines
- World Headquarters of the Bektashi
- History of the Albanian Americans in Metro Detroit
- Islam in Metro Detroit
- List of mosques in the United States
- Islamic Center of America
