= Interfaith Leadership Council of Metropolitan Detroit =

Detroit-based interfaith group known as the Interfaith Partners

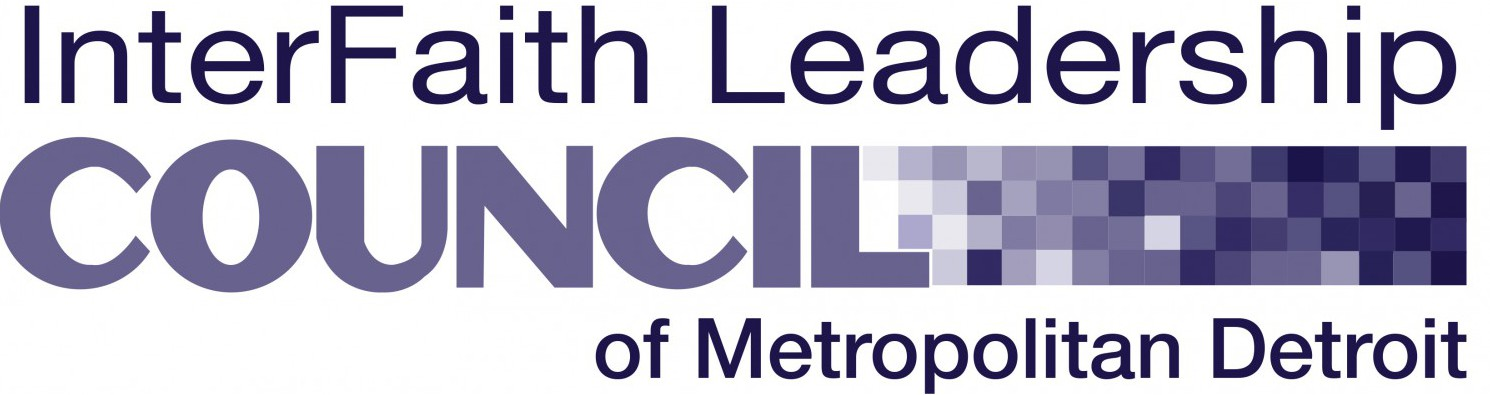
- IFLC of Metropolitan Detroit Logo
- Abbreviation: IFLC
- Formation: 2010
- Type: Interfaith Leadership Council
- Headquarters: Oak Park, Michigan
- President: Raman Singh
- Chairman: Robert A. Bruttell
- Vice Chairman: Bishop Greg Geiger
- Treasurer: Imam Steve Mustapha Elturk
- Board of directors: Chandru Acharya; Kari Alterman; Nancy Combs; Michael Hovey; Gail Katz; Dr. Trilochan Singh; Nancy Thayer; Leon Tupper; Jennifer Young
- Key people: secretary : Rev. Daniel Buttry
- Website: detroitinterfaithcouncil.com

The InterFaith Leadership Council of Metropolitan Detroit (also referred to as the IFLC) is an American faith-based civic organization founded in 2010 by members of a Detroit-based interfaith group known then as the Interfaith Partners. Its headquarters are in Oak Park, Michigan.

The group brings together people of faith, interfaith groups and networks to collaborate within the metropolitan Detroit community. The group also serves as a third-party advocate for conflict resolution and interfaith education. The IFLC has publicly advocated for religious freedom, civil discourse, humane and compassionate acceptance of refugees, and worked against bigotry and ill-will. It also provides extensive educational programs advancing religious literacy.

== History ==
The Interfaith Partners was by several Detroit faith-based organizations organized on September 12, 2001, to plan a joint prayer service in response to the September 11 attacks with several Detroit faith-based congregations. Original partners included representatives from the Jewish, Muslim, and Christian communities. The prayer service was held at Detroit's Fort Street Presbyterian Church.

Following the interfaith service, the group continued to meet monthly, moderated by the late Rev. Daniel Krichbaum. At the time, Krichbaum was the executive director of the Detroit office of the National Conference for Community Justice (NCCJ), which eventually became the Michigan Roundtable for Diversity and Inclusion.

The group is well known for several programs and services throughout the metropolitan Detroit area including educational programs, community initiatives, and service projects alongside numerous book projects and conflict resolution services.

In 2004, Abdul Latef and Abdul Motlib, two leaders within the Interfaith Partners, played an integral role in resolving a religious controversy in Hamtramck, Michigan. After the al-Islah Islamic Center petitioned and was granted the right to broadcast its call to prayer, or azan, over an outdoor loudspeaker, hundreds of citizens flocked to a city hall meeting in protest. Through community meetings and interfaith advocacy, members of the Interfaith Partners lead the Hamtramck City Council to unanimously pass a resolution in favor of the Islamic Center. This initiative lead to the establishment of an annual interfaith Thanksgiving dinner and ongoing interfaith relations in the community.

In 2010, the Interfaith Partners reorganized, becoming the InterFaith Leadership Council of Metropolitan Detroit (IFLC). The IFLC gained significant attention in 2010 after reacting to a planned anti-Islam protest in Dearborn, Michigan led by Terry Jones, a Florida-based leader of the Dove World Outreach Center. In an event called "Vigil for the Beloved Community", the group brought together roughly 1,500 faith leaders from across Detroit to support the Islamic Center of America in Dearborn and defuse the attention brought on by Jones' protest. IFLC members have also mobilized around other similar incidents where hate was directed at faith communities in the metropolitan area.

In 2014, the IFLC hosted the North American Interfaith Network (NAIN) Connect Conference on the campus of Wayne State University in Detroit. The conference theme was "Bridging Borders and Boundaries," and the event attracted over 150 registered guests internationally from 26 states and provinces and 48 different religious groups.

In early 2016, the group joined with several interfaith communities and organizations to offer drinking water to residents of Flint, Michigan during their 2015 water crisis.

Today, the IFLC hosts several interfaith events each month such as panels, roundtable discussions, educational programs, service projects, and workshops to bring together diverse faith groups and promote active collaboration between different faith groups in metropolitan Detroit. A major programmatic priority for the IFLC is religious literacy. Programs are offered for youth and adults in partnership with local universities and businesses to "create a respectful and inclusive community. The IFLC has also established a health and healthcare committee to engage faith-based health professionals around community health improvement initiatives. The group has also played a role in supporting the relocation of refugees to metropolitan Detroit schools in recent years.

== Educational programs ==
=== Religious Diversity Journeys ===
In 2001, the Michigan Roundtable for Diversity and Inclusion (MRDI), a nonprofit human relations organization, initiated the Religious Diversity Journeys program to promote understanding and awareness of prevalent religions in metropolitan Detroit.

In the Religious Diversity Journeys Program, area seventh-grade students participate in six full-day workshops (once a month from November through April) in several houses of worship throughout metropolitan Detroit. The program is available for seventh-graders and explores shared values between Christianity, Islam, Judaism, Hinduism, Buddhism, Sikhism, Jainism, Humanism and Native American beliefs. Through the program, students tour these houses of worship and engage in conversation about the negative effects of prejudice, stereotyping, and bullying of different religious groups. The program aligns with the State of Michigan seventh grade content expectations in world religions.

During the 2015–2016 school year, over 450 seventh-graders from 14 metropolitan Detroit school districts in Oakland and Wayne counties participated in the program, marking the largest overall participation in the program's history. The Islamic Center of America committed $3,000 over two years to help sponsor 30 students from Dearborn Public Schools in 2015.

=== Exploring our Religious Landscapes ===
Exploring our Religious Landscapes is an adult religious literacy program which provides the opportunity for adults to explore the sacred texts and rituals of four different faiths, and to join in discussion of the values that underlie different practices and how they come together in common purpose. The program consists of lectures, immersive worship experiences, dinners, and discussions at four different houses of worship per cycle.

== Partnering programs ==
=== Michigan Communicators ===
The Michigan Professional Communicators Roundtable was established as a spin-off group from the IFLC in 2014 and attracts professional journalists, public relations specialists, and individuals from communication-centered occupations to collaborate and discuss current trends in public media. The roundtable has attracted several prominent metropolitan Detroit-based communicators, including Rev. Laurie Haller, Dr. Howard Lupovitch, Michigan State University School of Journalism professor and former Detroit Free Press editor Joe Grimm, Imam Al-Masmari, and Rev. Amy Morgan. The group meets bi-monthly in several locations around metropolitan Detroit, and is moderated by publisher and journalist David Crumm.

=== Religious Leaders Forum (RLF) ===
The Religious Leaders Forum was organized by the IFLC in 2010. The group brings together senior faith leaders from most denominations and judicatories found in metropolitan Detroit.

On December 22, 2015, the RLF gathered at the Islamic Center of America in Dearborn to declare 2016 as a "Year of Faith and Peace" in metropolitan Detroit and around the world. The Year of Faith and Peace rally was a forum for members from several diverse houses of worship in the metropolitan Detroit area to "stand in solidarity to promote religious freedom and caring for all people". The Year of Faith and Peace rally sparked several initiatives hosted by the RLF, including educational events and exchanges throughout several diverse houses of worship across southeastern Michigan. Members of Catholic, Protestant, Orthodox Christian, Jewish, Hindu, Sikh, Shia Muslim, and Sunni Muslim leaders gathered to show support for the Year of Faith and Peace events as well as express concern with growing hate crime rates toward minorities and refugees. Members of these and other supporting groups released statements at the event supporting the efforts of the RLF and the Year of Faith and Peace, calling for a greater awareness of interfaith efforts.

== Awards and honors ==
Year	Award	Host	Project
2004	Community Service Award	National Conference for Community and Justice	Reuniting the Children of Abraham
2015	Spirit of Unity	Ecumenial Theological Seminary	n/a

== See also ==
- Religion in Metro Detroit
  - Islam in Metro Detroit
  - History of the Jews in Metro Detroit
