= Religion in Metro Detroit =

Aspect of culture

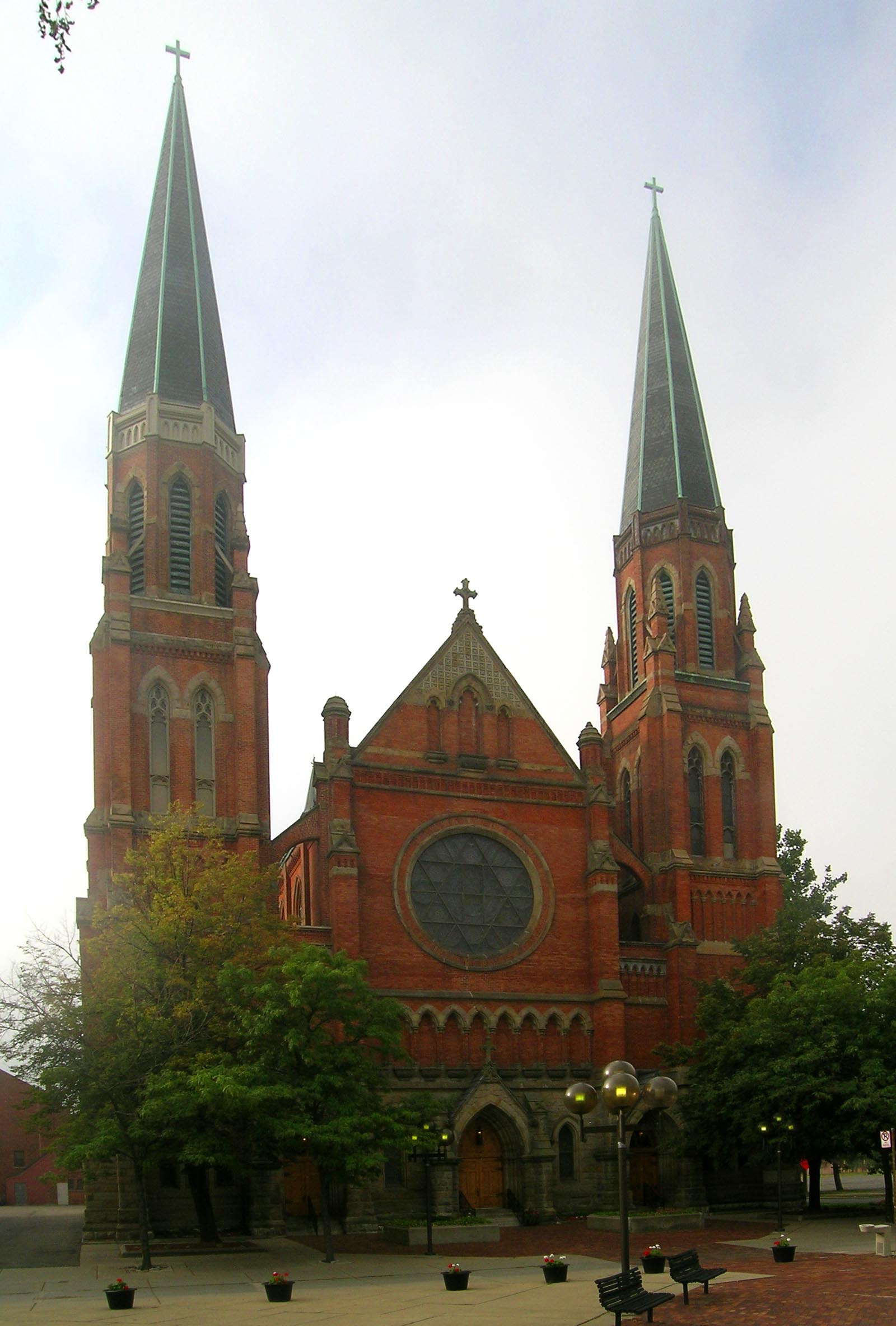
Ste. Anne de Detroit Catholic Church, the first church congregation founded in Detroit

Metro Detroit includes Christian, Muslim, Jewish, Hindu, Buddhist, and other groups.

According to a 2014 study, 67% of the population of Detroit identified themselves as Christians, with 49% professing attendance at Protestant churches, and 16% professing Catholic beliefs, while 24% claim no religious affiliation. Other religions collectively make up about 8% of the population.

== Christianity ==
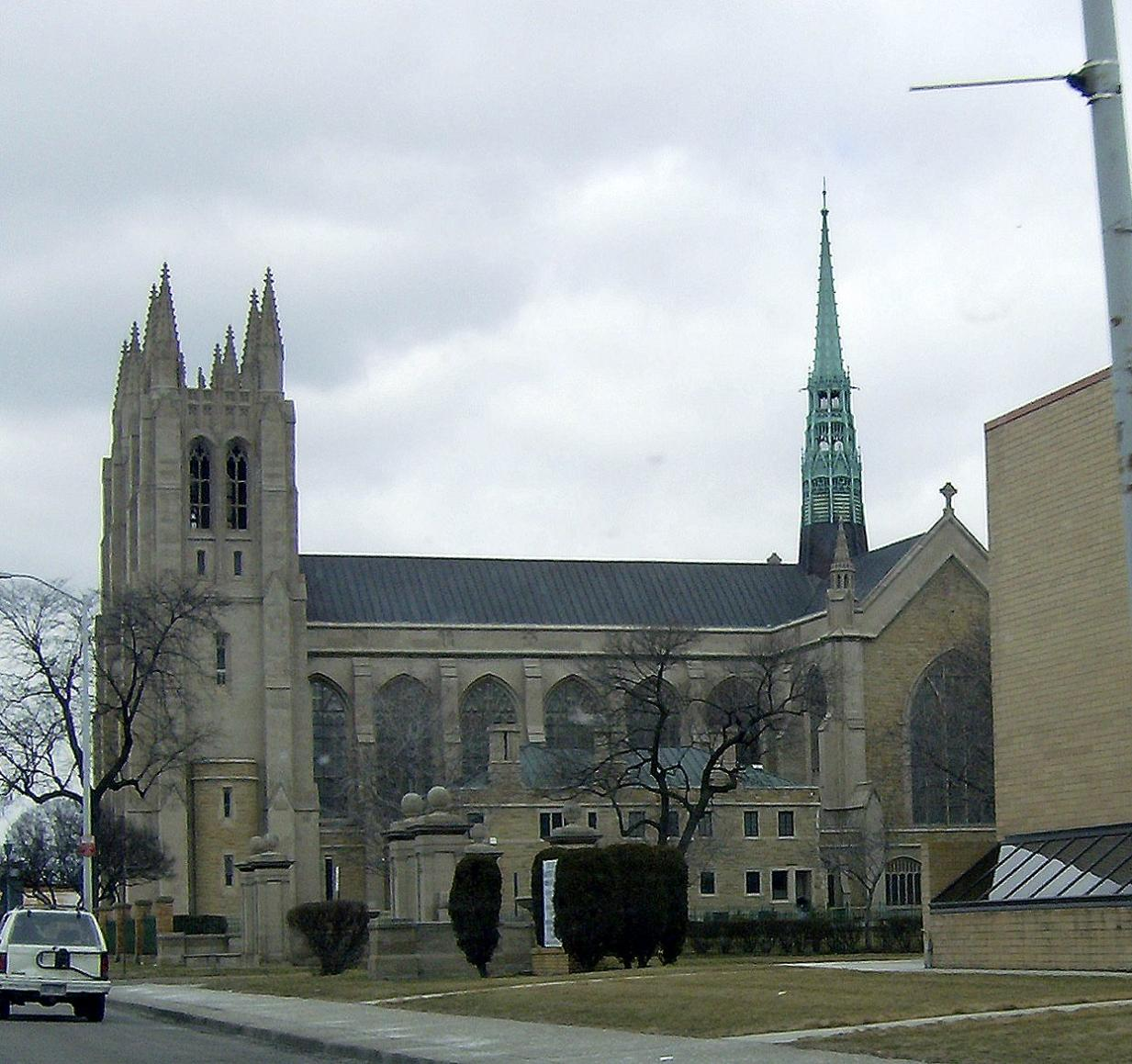
Cathedral of the Most Blessed Sacrament

The Catholic Archdiocese of Detroit is the Latin Catholic archdiocese serving Detroit. The Cathedral of the Most Blessed Sacrament is the seat of the Detroit archbishop.

As of 2010, many early 20th century and 19th century churches remain standing in the city. Karen Nagher, the executive director of "Preservation Wayne," referred to them as "churches any city would envy." The president of the Detroit chapter of the American Institute of Architects, Ray Cekauskas, stated that they were "one of the richest treasure troves of late 19th-century, ethnic-based churches anywhere in the country."

As of 2013, the Archdiocese of Detroit had 96 schools with 30,000 students. As of 2013 there are four Catholic grade schools and three Catholic high schools in the City of Detroit, with all of them in the city's west side. Catholic high schools in the Detroit city limits include University of Detroit Jesuit High School and Academy, Loyola High School, and Detroit Cristo Rey High School (which replaced Holy Redeemer High School). Detroit Catholic Central High School was formerly in the Detroit city limits.

=== History of Christianity in Detroit ===
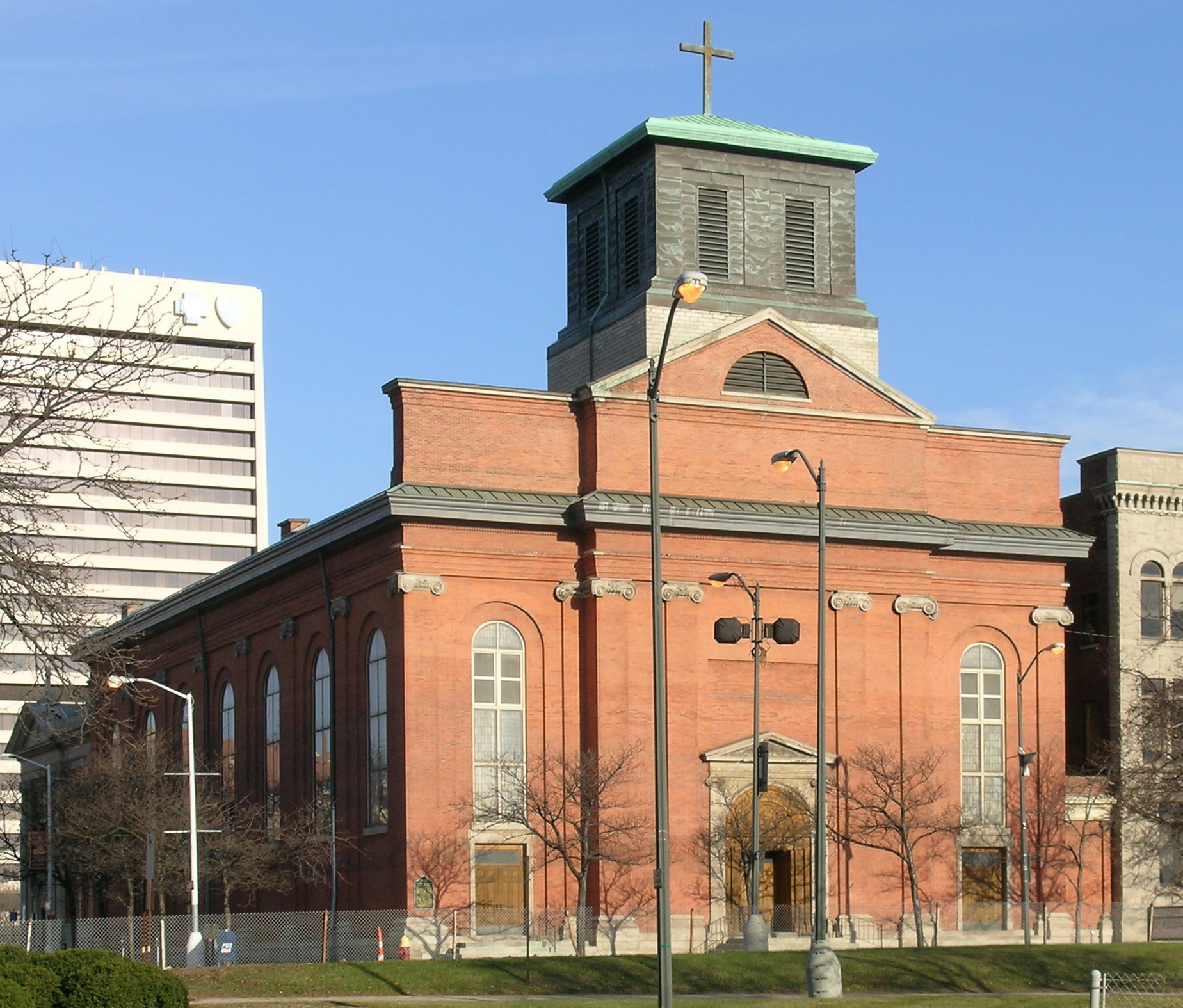
Sts. Peter and Paul Jesuit Church, the oldest church building in Detroit

The first church founded in the city was Ste. Anne de Detroit Catholic Church, which opened in 1701. The current Sts. Peter and Paul Jesuit Church building opened in what is now Downtown Detroit in 1848; it is the oldest church building in Detroit that is still standing today. The current Christ Church of Detroit facility was built in what is now Downtown Detroit in 1863; it is the oldest Protestant church in Michigan that is still at its original site. The current St. Anne opened in 1886.

Mexicans and Mexican Americans began attending Holy Redeemer Catholic Church in Mexicantown in 1955. In 1955, the Primera Iglesia Bautista Mexicana ("First Baptist Mexican Church") opened and its membership was 200 families by 1960. The same congregation established a branch of the Lincoln Park Baptist Church, the Primera Iglesia Bautista del Sur (First Baptist Church of the South) that year. By 1960, the Holy Redeemer Elementary School had 200 Mexicans out of its 1,200 students. By 1961, the Holy Redemer church had established a Spanish language mass and it had 500 Mexican church worshipers.

As of the 1950s and 1960s, other churches frequented by Mexican Americans and Mexicans included All Saints Church, Holy Cross Church in Delray, Most Holy Trinity, St. Anne's, St. Anthony, St. Boniface, St. Leo, and St. Vincent.

In the 1964-65 school year, there were 360 schools operated by the Archdiocese of Detroit, with about 110 grade schools in Detroit, Hamtramck, and Highland Park and 55 high schools in those three cities. There were a total of 203,000 students in the Catholic schools. The Catholic school population has decreased due to the increase of charter schools, increasing tuition at Catholic schools, the small number of African-American Catholics, White Catholics moving to suburbs, and the decreased number of teaching nuns.

Religious TV program Jack Van Impe Ministries is broadcast from Rochester Hills.

=== Copts ===
St. Mark Coptic Orthodox Church in Troy, Michigan is the religious center of the Copts. Pope Shenouda III laid the first cornerstone of the church. Construction began on May 1, 1977 and was completed in May 1979, with the first Holy Communion on May 8 of that year and consecration in 1981, from June 12 through June 14. The Coptic community is scattered across Metro Detroit, with many living far away from the church. Some members of the church live in northern Ohio.

== Islam ==
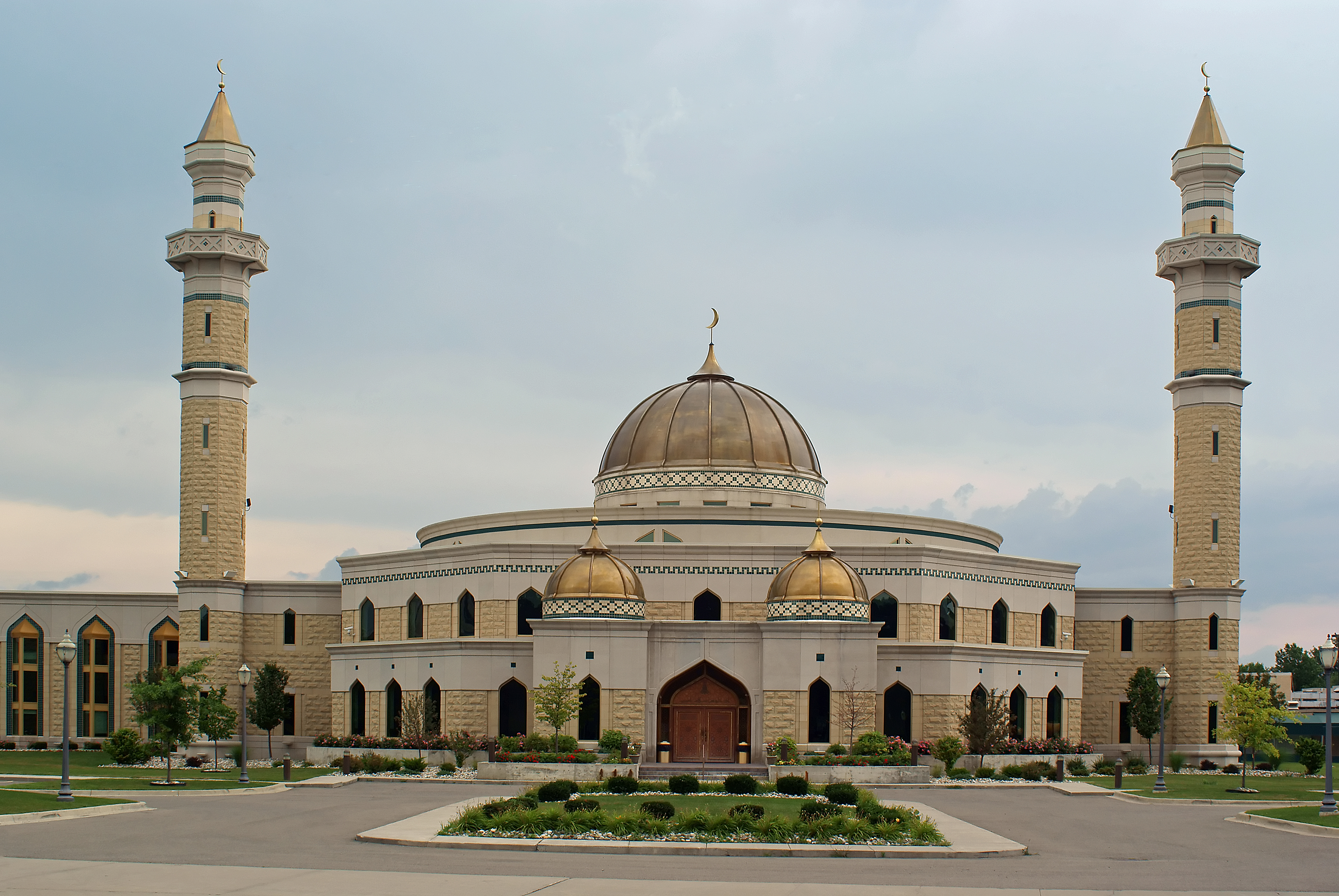
Islamic Center of America

Mosques in Dearborn include the Islamic Center of America and the Dearborn Mosque.

== Judaism ==
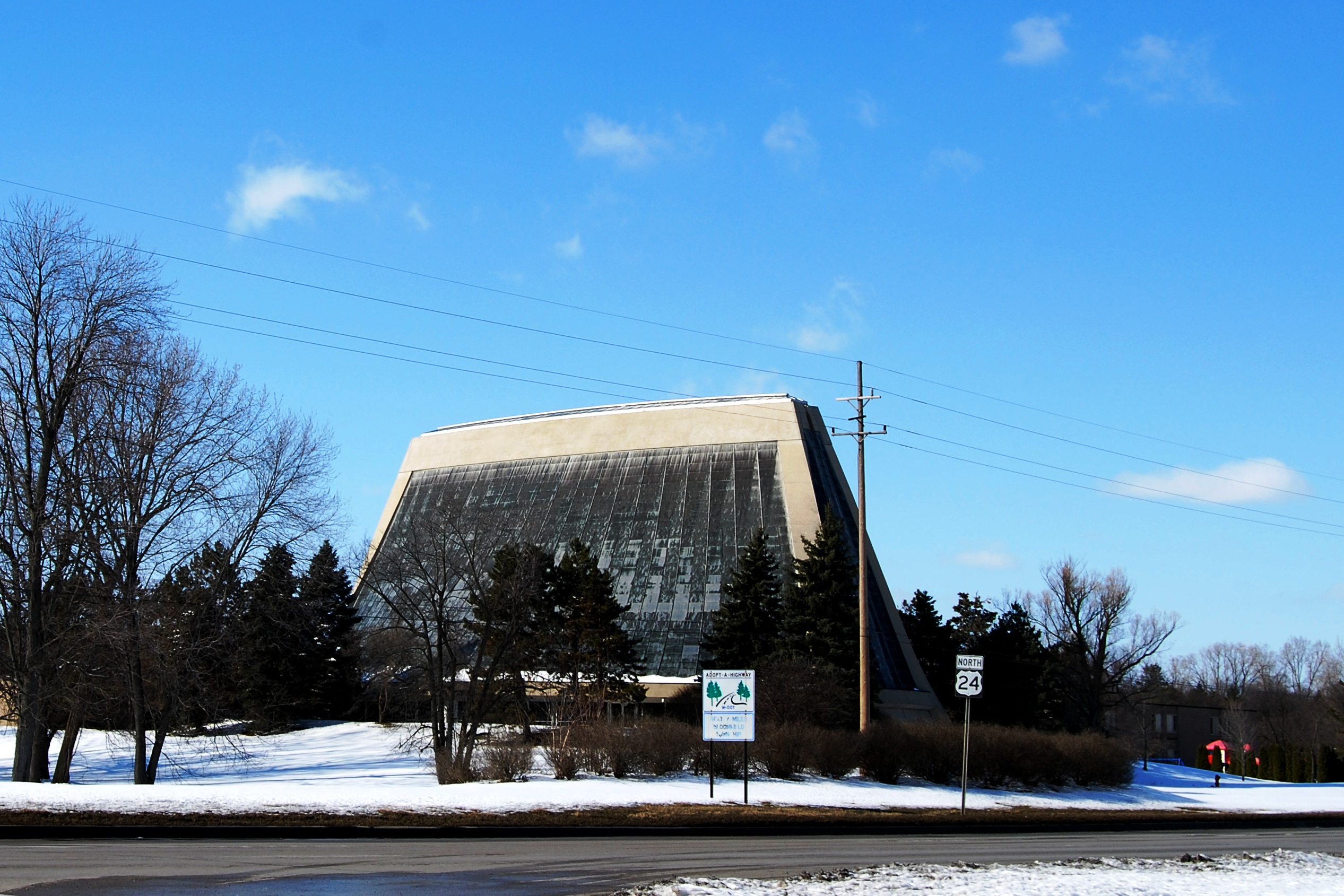
Temple Beth El in Bloomfield Township

As of 2001, about 96,000 Jewish Americans live in Metro Detroit. 75% of them live in Oakland County. Many are in walking distances to their synagogues. As of 2006, the Jews living in Windsor, Ontario live closer to Downtown Detroit than the Jewish communities within Metro Detroit.

== Hinduism ==
As of 2013, Hindu temples and religious centers had been recently established in Detroit, Ada, Canton, Hamtramck, Livonia, Novi, Pontiac, Sterling Heights, and Troy. In 2012 a Hindu temple built for $11 million opened in Troy.

The 25,000-square-foot (2,300 m^{2}) Sri Venkateswara Temple and Cultural Center (SVTCC), built for $10 million, opened in Novi in 2013. It is the first Michigan Hindu temple to be named after a southern Indian deity. It had a temporary location for five years before it opened its permanent facility. As of 2013, the temple has a client base of about 3,000 people. The community operating the temple mostly comes from the Indians who speak Telugu. Many of them originate from Andhra Pradesh.

== Buddhism ==
The Sacred Mountain Monastery-Linh Son Temple is located along 9 Mile Road in Warren. The operators are primarily Vietnamese Americans; many of them came to the United States because of the Vietnam War.

The Buddhist Meditation Center/Wat Paknam Michigan (Thai: วัดปากน้ำมิชิแกน), founded in 2009, is located in Sterling Heights.

== Satanism ==
In 2014, a chapter of The Satanic Temple was established in Detroit and the membership at the time was 20 people. The leader was Jex Blackmore, who was raised in Metro Detroit and had graduated from the University of Michigan. The Satanic Temple spokesperson, Lucien Greaves, originated from Metro Detroit as well. Greaves stated that the Satanic Temple chose Detroit as the site its flagship chapter house because of the city's history with artistic groups that acted against the status quo and its underdog reputation.

The group has not confirmed where the temple facility will be located. The group plans to erect a statue of the Devil; it would not be the first Devil statue in the city because in 1905 a German American named Herman Menz had built a statue there.

== See also ==
- Demographics of Metro Detroit
- Interfaith Leadership Council of Metropolitan Detroit
