= Dearborn Mosque =

Mosque in Dearborn, Michigan, United States

American Moslem Society (Dearborn Mosque)
- الجمعية الاسلامية الامريكيى (مسجد ديربورن)٠
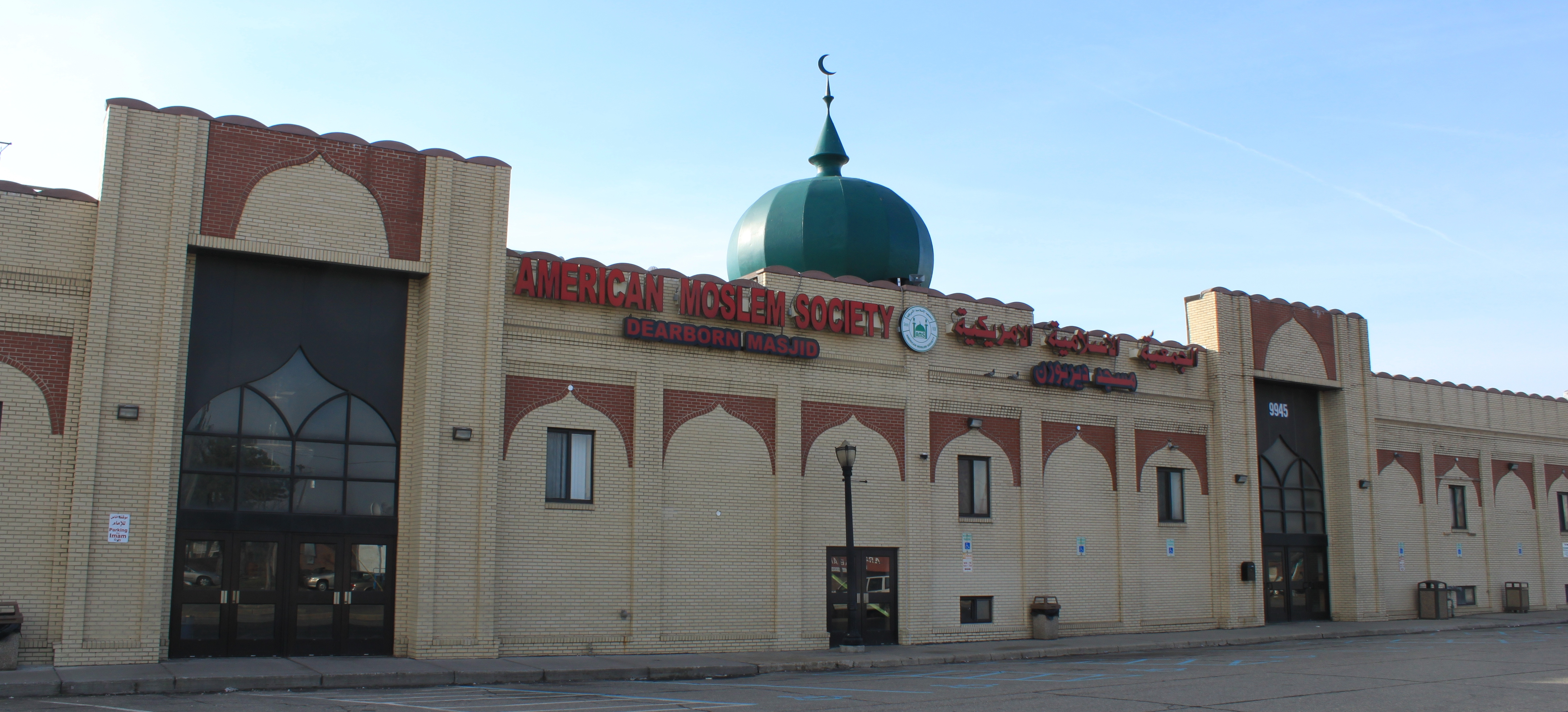

Religion
- Affiliation: Sunni
- Leadership: Imam(s):Sheikh Mohammed Alhaddad

Location
- Location: 9945 Vernor Hwy, Dearborn, Michigan, United States
- Interactive map of American Moslem Society (Dearborn Mosque)
- Coordinates: 42°18′15.9″N 83°08′37.0″W

Architecture
- Completed: 1937

Specifications
- Capacity: 2,000
- Dome: 1
- Minaret: 2

Website
- amsdearborn.org

Dearborn Mosque is a mosque belonging to the American Moslem Society (الجمعية الإسلامية الامريكية) in Dearborn, Michigan. It was built in 1937 by the nascent Islamic community (then mostly Sunni Muslims from the Bekaa Valley in Lebanon), and was only the second mosque constructed in the United States. The building is three stories high and almost an entire city block on the intersection of Vernor and Dix Streets.

The number of people attending grew rapidly through the 1960s to 1980s. In the early 1980s, the mosque obtained a court order permitting it to broadcast the call to prayer using loudspeakers, overruling objections from some of its neighbors; it was the first mosque in America to do so. The court ruled that it was the Muslim equivalent of church bells.

Dearborn Mosque is not to be confused with the Islamic Center of America, also in Dearborn, which was the nation's largest mosque when it opened in 2005.

== See also ==
- Islam in Metro Detroit
- List of mosques in the United States
