= Al-Islah Mosque =

Mosque in Hamtramck, Michigan, US

- আল-ইসলাহ জামে মসজিদ
- Location within Michigan

Religion
- Affiliation: Sunni Islam
- Status: Active

Location
- Location: Hamtramck, Wayne County
- State: Michigan
- Country: United States of America
- Interactive map of Al-Islah Mosque
- Coordinates: 42.399805°N 83.060681°W

Architecture
- Type: Mosque
- Established: 2000

Website
- www.al-islah.us

Al-Islah Mosque (Bengali: আল-ইসলাহ জামে মসজিদ), also known as the Al-Islah Islamic Center or the Al-Islah Jame Masjid, is a mosque following the Sunni tradition in Hamtramck, Michigan. It was founded in 2000 by immigrants from Bangladesh, of which a large community exists in Hamtramck. Al-Islah Mosque is currently expanding to a bigger building next door.

== History ==
The founders of the mosque, Bangladeshi Americans, were followers of Allama Abdul Latif Chowdhury. It first opened in a storefront on Joseph Campau in 2000 and moved into a former medical clinic in 2001. In 2004 the mosque purchased an adjacent building so it could establish a madrassa (Islamic school).

The mosque attracted national attention in 2004, when it requested permission to broadcast its call to prayer. This upset many of the non-Muslim residents of the area, which has a large and long established Polish Catholic population. Proponents pointed out that the city was already subject to loud bell ringing from the local church, while opponents argued that the church bells served a nonreligious purpose. Though nothing prevented the mosque from broadcasting the Adhan, to begin with, the city council nonetheless added an official "okay" in May 2004. Later that year, the city amended its noise regulations to limit the volume of all religious sounds. Prior to this, other mosques in the Detroit area had been using loudspeakers to broadcast their calls to prayer without incident.

== See also ==
- Islam in Metro Detroit
