= Mohamad Jawad Chirri =

American imam (1905–1994)

- Title: Imam, Sheikh

Personal life
- Born: October 1, 1905; Lebanon
- Died: November 10, 1994 (aged 89); Dearborn, Michigan, United States
- Era: Contemporary history
- Region: Middle East and the US
- Main interest(s): Kalam, Tafsir, Hadith, Ilm ar-Rijal, Usul, Fiqh, Dawah
- Notable idea: Islamic Center of America
- Notable work(s): The Shi'ites Under Attack, others

Religious life
- Religion: Islam
- Denomination: Shia Islam
- Jurisprudence: Twelver Ja'fari jurisprudence

Muslim leader
- Influenced by: Ayatollah Khomeini

Imam Mohamad Jawad Chirri (Arabic: محمد جواد شري; October 1, 1905 – November 10, 1994) was the founder and director of the Islamic Center of America until his death.

== Books authored ==
In addition to writing The Shi'ites Under Attack:

Books about Islamic jurisprudence and its basis:

1. Al-Riyad in the Basis of Jurisprudence
2. Al-Taharah (the purity)
3. Fasting
4. The Book of Prayer
5. The Islamic Wills-

A book about the caliphate:

1. The Caliphate in the Islamic Constitution.

Books in English about Islam:

1. Muslim Practice
2. The Faith of Islam
3. Inquiries About Islam
4. Imam Hussein, Leader of the Martyrs
5. The Brother of the Prophet Muhammad (the Imam Ali). (He also wrote this book in Arabic and named it Amir al-Mu'minin)

== Mission ==
Imam Chirri's goal was to spread Islam in a country that had not known it and to a community that he felt was starving for it. The sizable Muslim community in the Dearborn/Detroit metro area can serve as an example of his influence.

== Biography ==
Imam Mohamad Jawad Chirri was born in Lebanon to a Shi’a Muslim family. He was a graduate of the theological seminary of Najaf in Iraq. He then traveled to the United States of America in 1948 .

== Building the Islamic Center of Detroit ==
In 1959, Imam Mohamad Jawad Chirri traveled to the United Arab Republic (Egypt) to meet with President Gamal Abdel Nasser to seek financial assistance in building a new mosque in America. The Islamic Center of Detroit (which would later be renamed the Islamic Center of America) opened its doors in 1962.

== See also ==
- History of the Middle Eastern people in Metro Detroit
