= Michigan Islamic Academy =

School in Michigan, United States

Coordinates: 42°18′04.7″N 83°42′52.7″W

Michigan Islamic Academy (MIA) is a Kindergarten through grade 12 Islamic private day school in Ann Arbor, Michigan. The school was opened in 1985.

As of 2015 it had 213 students. 75 of them lived in Ann Arbor, 52 lived in Ypsilanti, 35 in Canton, 20 in the Dearborn area, four each in Jackson and Westland, three each in Dexter, Farmington, and South Lyon, two each in Plymouth and Superior Township (Washtenaw County), and one each in Brighton, Harper Woods, Northville, Saline, Southfield, and Whitmore.

== See also ==
- Islam in Metro Detroit
