= Baba Rexheb =

Albanian Islamic scholar (1901–1995)

- Rexheb Beqiri

Personal life
- Born: Rexheb Beqiri; August 18, 1901 Gjirokastër, Ottoman Empire
- Died: August 10, 1995 (aged 93) Taylor, Michigan, United States

Religious life
- Religion: Islam
- Sect: Bektashism

Rexheb Beqiri (18 August 1901—10 August 1995), better known by the religious name Baba Rexheb, was an Albanian Muslim scholar and Sufi. He was the founder and the head of the Bektashi tekke located in Taylor, Michigan in the United States.

== Early life ==
Baba Rexheb was born as Rexheb Beqiri, on 18 August 1901, into a family with strong Bektashi ties in Gjirokastër, southern Albania, at a time when Albania was still part of the Ottoman Empire. His father, Refat Beqiri, was a local mullah in the old neighbourhood of Dunavat, Gjirokastër. Refat’s family had originally migrated to southern Albania from the Kosovar town of Gjakova. His mother was from Elbasan in central Albania as was his murshid, his spiritual guide, Selim Baba Elbasani. He entered the Bektashi Order at the age of sixteen and was promoted to the rank of dervish at the age of twenty. A year later, he took an additional vow as a mücerred (مجرد) or celibate dervish. For the next twenty-five years, he served in the Zall Tekke under the guidance of his maternal uncle, Baba Selim.

During World War II, Dervish Rexhep followed the advice of his murshid and went from village to village, telling the people that Communists din yok, vatan yok: "They have no religion, they have no homeland." Because of this, he was forced to flee in 1944 when the communists under Enver Hoxha came to power. He spent four years in a displaced persons camp in Italy. He dreamed of serving Bektashis in America, but coming to the United States was difficult after World War II. He went to the tekke of Kaygusuz Abdal in Mokattam in Cairo, Kingdom of Egypt and the Sudan. He stayed there for four years until his number for the United States finally came up. He travelled to New York City, where one of his sisters, Zeynep Cuçi, had preceded him.

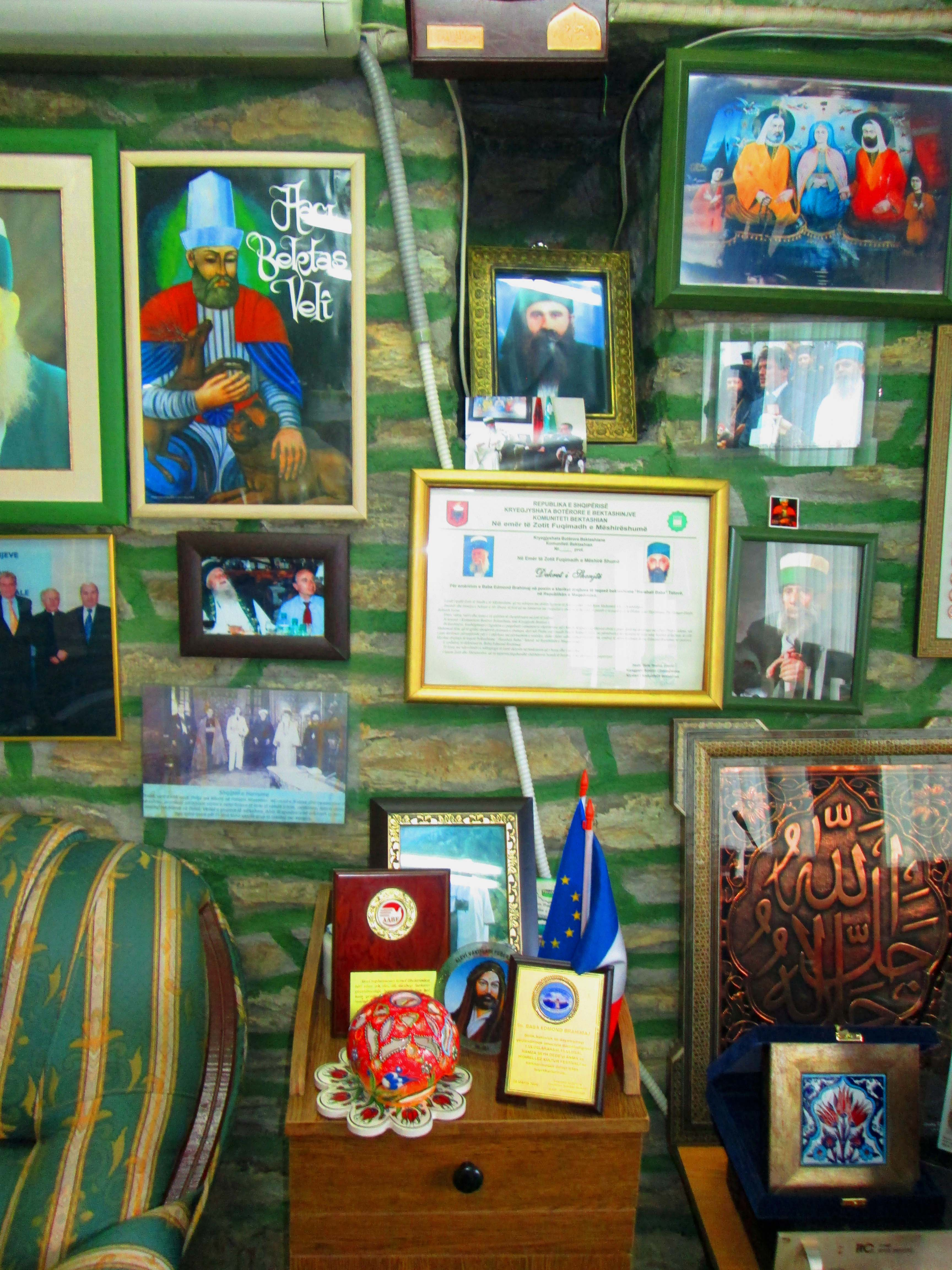
Photo of Baba Rexheb (on the right over the red Allah calligraphy) in the Arabati Baba Teḱe of Tetovo, North Macedonia.

== Bektashi career ==
In 1954, Baba Rexheb established the First Albanian Bektashi Tekke in America in Taylor, Michigan just outside Detroit, where there was a group of Albanian Bektashis who supported him.

Baba Rexheb was joined by Baba Bajram of Tepelenë, Arshi of Vlorë, and several other Bektashi clerics from Egypt and the Balkans. In the 1960s, Albanian Bektashi immigrants began to arrive in the Detroit area from the Socialist Republic of Macedonia, strengthening the Bektashi community. At this time, the Bektashi Tekke was also a working farm with orchards, fields, gardens, animals, and a large hen barn. Bektashis came from Canada and other parts of America to be with Baba. There were always many people at the long kitchen table for the main midday meal of the day. People gathered outside in the garden, and many came days early for the holidays.

In 1967, Baba Rexheb began his master work in Albanian, Misticizma Islame dhe Bektashizma "Islamic Mysticism and Bektashism". He published it in 1970. In 2016, the book was fully translated into English by Huseyin Abiva.

Later, Baba Rexheb was asked by Baba Qamil of Gjakova, Kosovo to translate into Albanian Fuzuli's Hadikat-i Su'ada "Garden of the Blessed", a classic 16th century work in Ottoman Turkish, parts of which are read aloud at the holiday of Muharram. Baba was fluent in Arabic, Persian, Ottoman Turkish, modern Turkish, Greek, and Italian. He had passed the tests for the ulama back in Albania, but more importantly, he had studied Arabic and Persian texts with Selim Baba Elbasani for twenty years. While in Egypt, he also read more of these texts in the Bektashi library.

Baba Rexheb taught an American linguistic anthropologist who had learned Albanian, Frances Trix, for over 20 years. Frances Trix had researched for over 30 years with the Detroit Bektashi community and studied for 25 years with Baba Rexheb. Trix later published a biography of Baba Rexheb in 2009. Baba Rexheb's prayers were also sought by people of all backgrounds.

Baba Rexheb died on August 10, 1995 (Rabi' al-Awwal 12, 1416 Hijri year). His türbe (maqam or shrine-mausoleum) is on the tekke grounds and is open to pilgrims and truth-seekers of all walks of life.

== See also ==
- History of the Albanian Americans in Metro Detroit
- Islam in Metro Detroit

== Bibliography ==
- Trix, Frances (2009). The Sufi journey of Baba Rexheb. Philadelphia: University of Pennsylvania Museum of Archaeology and Anthropology. ISBN 978-1-934536-12-4.
