= History of the Albanian Americans in Metro Detroit =

The organization Global Detroit stated that the largest group of ethnic Albanians not in Europe is in Metro Detroit. As of 2014, 4,800 ethnic Albanians live in Macomb County, making up the fourth-largest ethnic group in that county, and the highest concentration of Albanians in Metro Detroit. There are also several thousand in Wayne County, with most living outside Detroit city limits; Hamtramck and St. Clair Shores are plentiful in Albanian American and Kosovar-Albanian American communities. There are at least ethnically 30,200 Albanian people in Michigan, constituting 0.3% of Michigan's population.

Sterling Heights, Troy, Livonia, St. Clair Shores, Westland, Farmington Hills, Wixom, Fraser, Rochester Hills, Warren, and Dearborn all have ethnic Albanian populations toward or over 400, and are mostly over one percent of said city's populations. Sterling Heights has 3,500 and Troy 1,000.

== History ==
In 1912 Albanians began arriving in the area. They had no peak migration period. At the time there were groups in east Detroit, northwest Detroit, and Grosse Pointe.

The early settlers originated from southern Albania, but they were recorded as being from Greece, Turkey, or from the country in which they boarded their boats to the United States. Many had initially lived in New York and New England but moved to Detroit by the 1910s.

Frances Trix, the author of The Sufi Journey of Baba Rexheb, wrote that Detroit's Albanian community was more conservative than that of New York City, and that the "cohesiveness that crossed religious lines and that manifested itself in gatherings and in unusual generosity to Albanian cultural activities" was a factor special to Albanians in Detroit.

As of 1951 Metro Detroit had about 3,000 Albanians.

A wave of mass immigration came in 1992 with the breakup of Yugoslavia and it continued in the 1990s. Some Catholic ethnic Albanians from Montenegro entered the United States from Mexico and settled in Detroit.

== Distribution ==
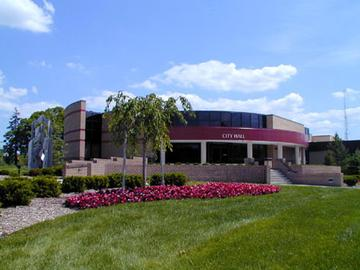
Sterling Heights is an Albanian-American mecca of Michigan.

3% of Hamtramck residents, a city in Wayne County, is ethically Albanian, as of 2000. However, this figure would later be decreased to 70 from another Census-extracted source, as of a count done in the late 2010s.

Sterling Heights, Troy, Livonia, St. Clair Shores, Westland, Farmington Hills, Wixom, Fraser, Rochester Hills, Warren, and Dearborn all have ethnic Albanian populations toward or over 400, and are mostly over one percent of said city's populations. Sterling Heights has 3,500 Albanians, 2.5% of the city's population, and Troy has 1,000, 1.1%. Detroit has a very low Albanian population of only 170 residents.

=== Influence in Southern Ontario ===
While not in the U.S. or Michigan, Windsor, Ontario, directly alongside the border with Detroit, has an Albanian Canadian population of 1,300, 0.6% of that city's population. Windsor has many Eastern European, Muslim, and Balkan immigrant and diasporic communities.

== Economy ==
By 2012 many Albanians were operating Coney islands, or restaurants serving the Coney Island hot dog. Albanians in general operate many restaurants. Many Albanian immigrants are employees in fast food restaurants in Macomb County and Oakland County.

Albanian TV of America, headquartered in Troy, transmits Albanian-language television shows.

== Religion ==
In 1929 the St. Thomas Orthodox Church was established by Albanian Christians. Albanian Muslims assisted the Christians with their mortgage.

For a period of time prior to 1949, Hussein Karoub provided pastoral services to the Albanian Muslims. In 1949 the first U.S. Albanian mosque opened in Detroit; The Albanian Moslem Society, organized in 1947, established it once it had recruited a cleric. This cleric was Vehbi Ismail. Ismail accused Karoub of trying to sabotage him.

The First Albanian Bektashi Monastery (Tekke) opened in Taylor in 1953. Baba Rexheb, an Albanian Sufi, established it. In 1963 the Albanian Islamic Center in Harper Woods opened.

The authors Abdo Elkholy, Frances Trix, and Linda Walbridge all, as paraphrased by Sally Howell, stated that "relations between Albanian Muslims and other Muslims in Detroit were limited at best."

Metro Detroit Albanian religious centers

- Albanian Islamic Center of Michigan (Harper Woods, MI)
- Bektashi Center of America (Taylor, MI)
- Our Lady of Albanians Catholic Church (Southfield, MI)
- St Paul Albanian Catholic Church (Rochester Hills, MI)
- St Thomas Orthodox Church (Farmington Hills, MI)

== Notable residents ==
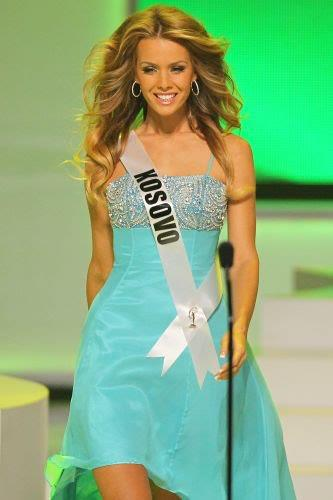
Afërdita Dreshaj, model with Metro Detroit roots.

- Ekrem Bardha - businessman
- Emina Cunmulaj – model
- Afërdita Dreshaj - model
- JMSN - singer
- Elizabeth Ivezaj - Miss Michigan 2014
- Baba Rexheb
- Suzanna Shkreli
