= Islamic Center of America =

Mosque in Dearborn, Michigan

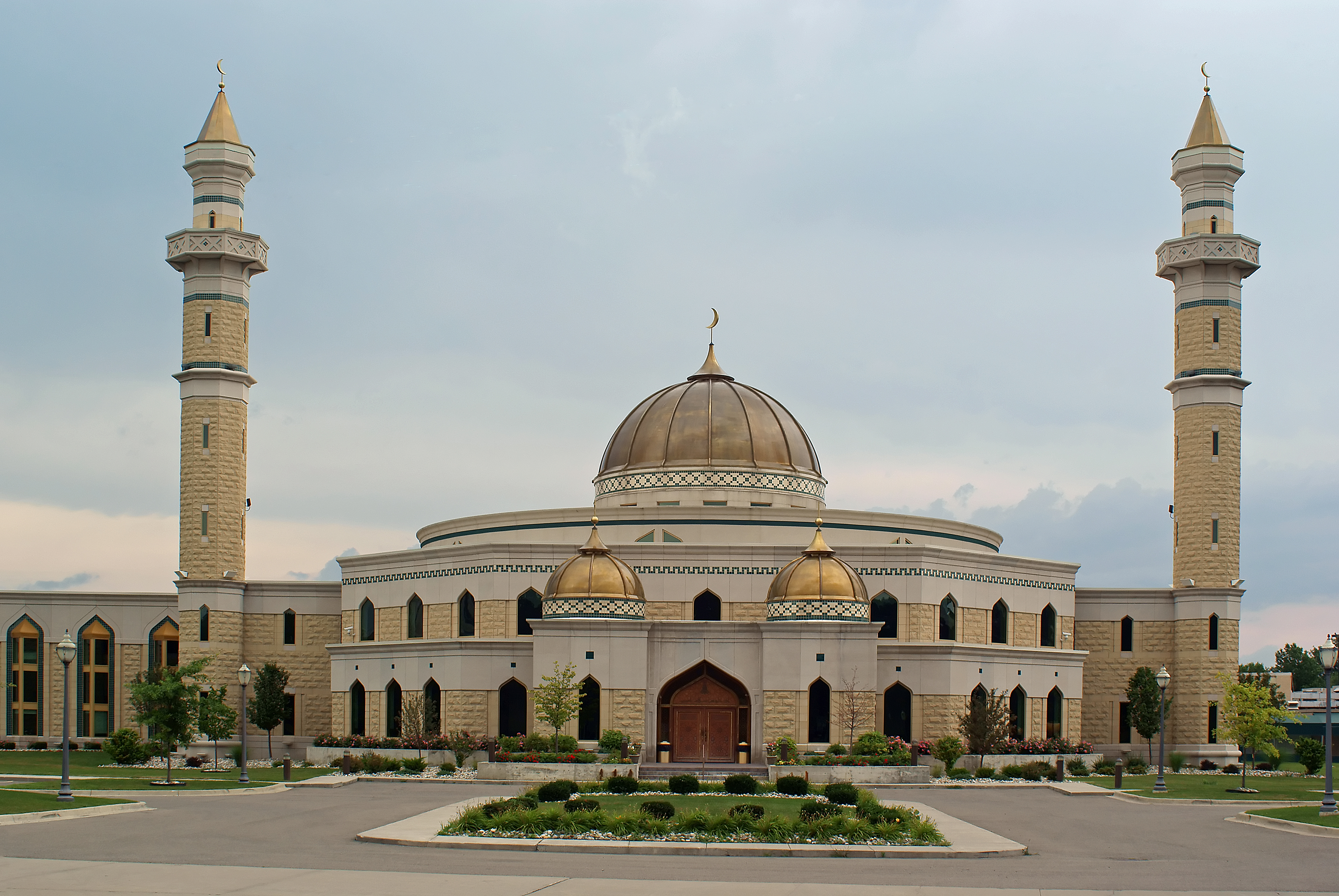

- Location in Michigan

Religion
- Affiliation: Shia Islam
- Leadership: Sheikh Ahmad Hammoud
- Year consecrated: September 20, 1963; May 12, 2005 (current location)

Location
- Location: Dearborn, Michigan
- Coordinates: 42.3301°N 83.2296°W

Architecture
- Architect: David Donnellon
- Type: Islamic architecture
- Completed: 2005
- Construction cost: US$14 million

Specifications
- Capacity: 3,000+ worshippers
- Interior area: 120,000 sq ft (11,000 m^{2})
- Dome: One
- Dome height (outer): 150 ft (46 m)
- Minaret: 2
- Minaret height: 10 stories tall

Website
- www.icofa.com

The Islamic Center of America (Arabic: ٱلْمَرْكَز ٱلْإِسْلَامِيّ فِي أَمْرِيكَا, al-Markaz al-ʾIslāmīy Fī ʾAmrīkā) is a mosque located in Dearborn, Michigan, in the United States. The 120,000 sq. ft. facility is the largest mosque in North America and the second largest Shia facility in North America after the Jaffari Community Centre in Toronto, Ontario, Canada and the oldest purpose-built Shia mosque in the United States, as well as the second oldest mosque in the United States after 'Asser El Jadeed which originally opened in 1924 in Michigan City, Indiana.

The Islamic Center of America is located at 19500 Ford Road in Dearborn. The institution was founded in 1949.

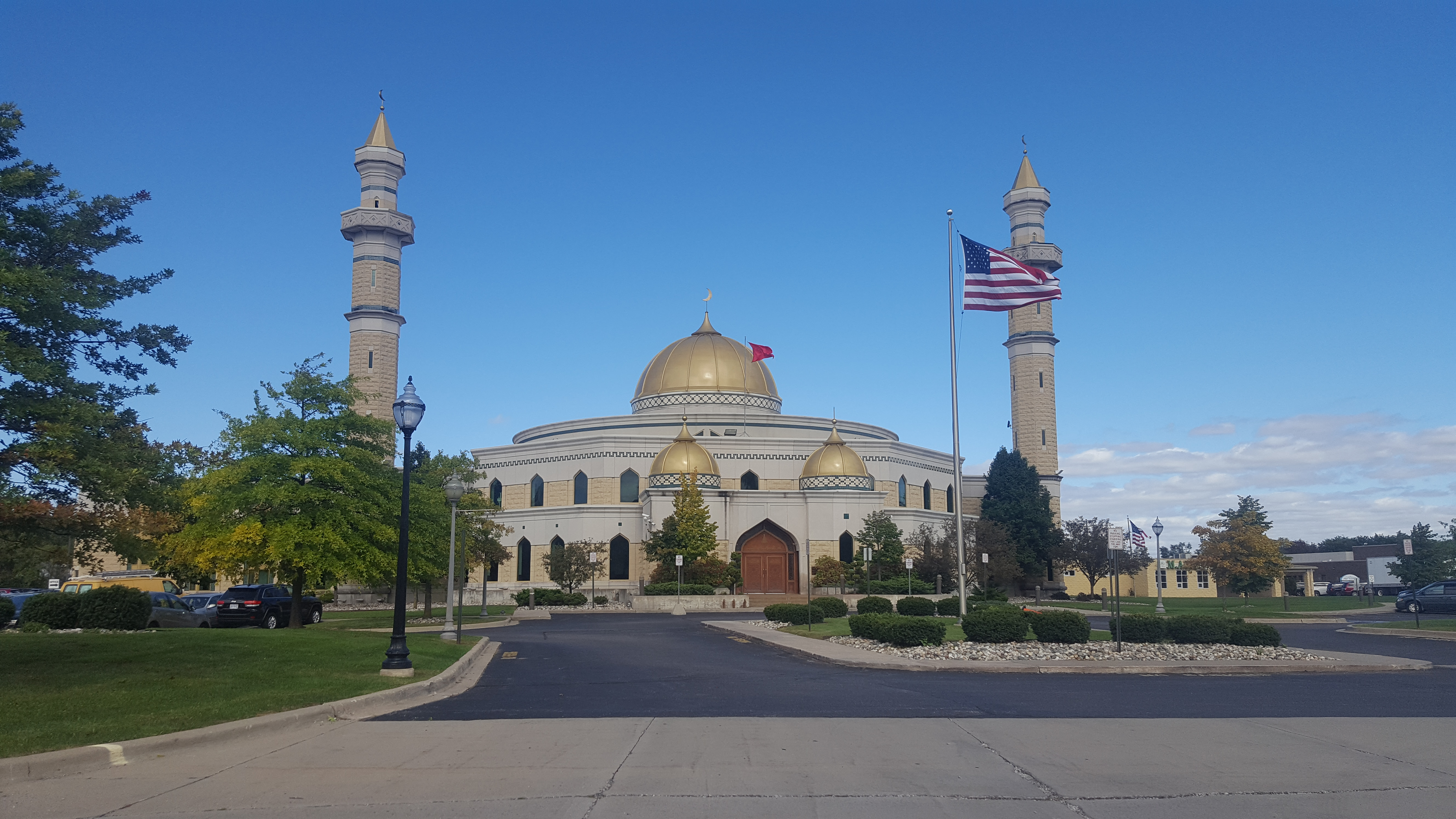

== History ==
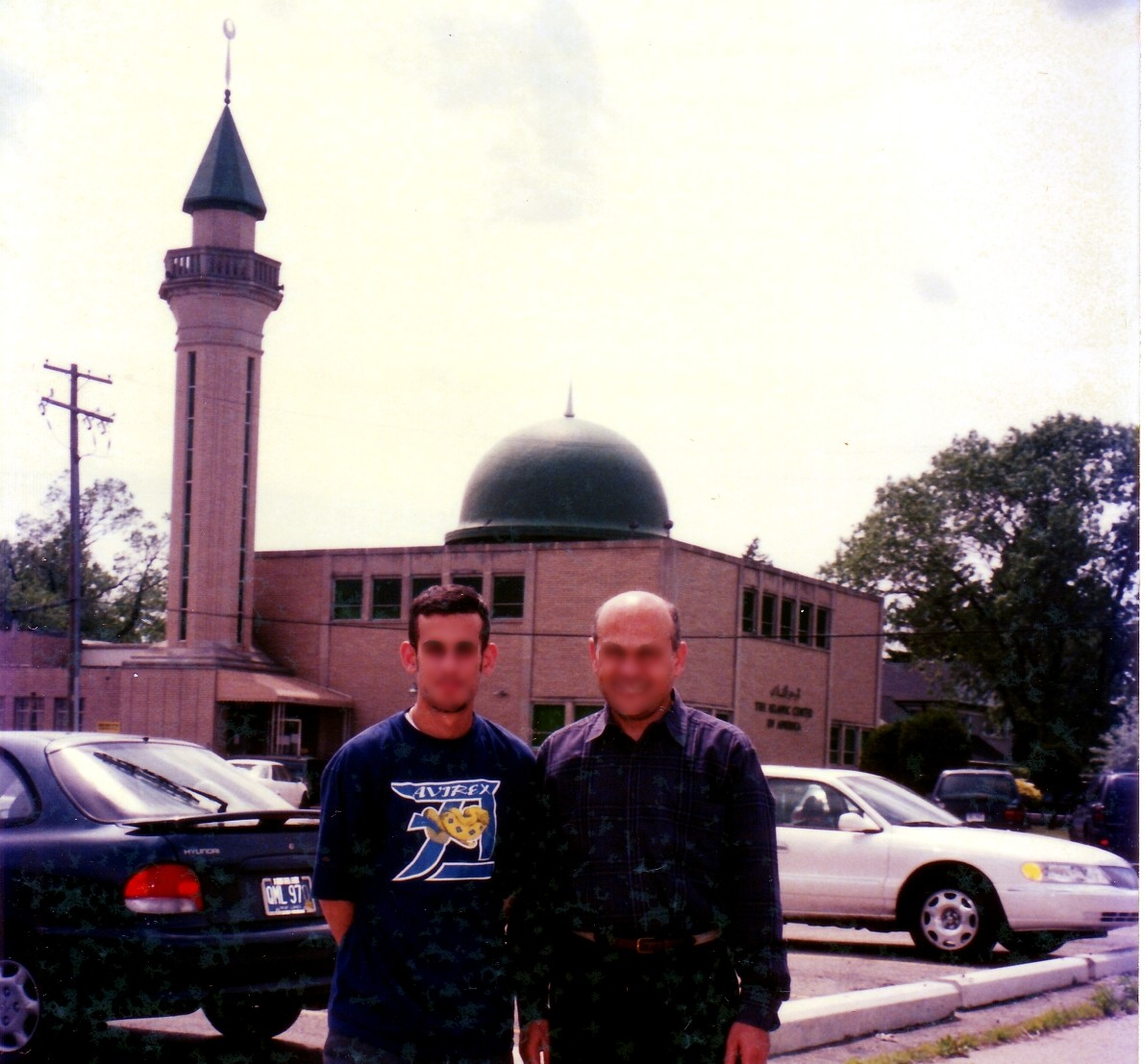
The center's original 1963 mosque in Detroit is pictured in the background in 2002.

The growing number of Muslims in the Detroit area in the mid-20th century sought out a religious leader from the Middle East to serve the community. Imam Muhammad Chirri of Lebanon was invited to lead the newly formed Islamic Center Foundation Society, which would later turn into the Islamic Center of Detroit, and later the Islamic Center of America. The center first opened its doors at a location in Detroit on September 20, 1963 with financial support from the local community who pledged their homes as collateral along with a gift from Egyptian President Gamal Abdel Nasser. The property for the construction of the Joy Road Mosque was purchased from the Ford Motor Company. Imam Hassan Al-Qazwini led the center in 1997, several years after Imam Chirri's passing, and assumed the role of religious leader for 18 years. The Islamic Center of America outgrew its original Detroit location and in 2005 moved to its present location on Ford Road in Dearborn. The Detroit mosque at the center's original site is now known as the Az-Zahra Center, where prayers services are still offered.

=== 2007 vandalism ===
The mosque was vandalized in January 2007 with anti-Shia graffiti. Many in the community believed that the vandalism was the result of recurrent sectarian tensions within the American Sunni Muslim community over the Iraq War and its Shia–Sunni conflict.

=== 2011 mosque bombing plot ===
On January 24, 2011, an Imperial Beach, California man named Roger Stockham was arrested and charged with terrorism after attempting to blow up the Islamic Center of America. Stockham was reported to be a convert to Sunni Islam who was targeting the Shia community, and had a history of mental illness and firearms offenses.

=== Terry Jones rally ===
On April 21, 2011, the day before the scheduled appearance of the anti-Islamic pastor Terry Jones, hundreds of people from different faiths gathered in a show of solidarity. Jews, Christians and other faith groups stood side by side with inter-locked arms in opposition to Jones' planned protest.

=== School and education ===
The mosque operates the Muslim American Youth Academy (MAYA), an Islamic private elementary and middle school.

== Architecture ==
The Islamic Center of America is a 120,000-square-foot (11,000 m^{2}) religious space. It includes a meeting hall, an industrial kitchen, a prayer room, a high ceiling and calligraphy-embraided domes, a mezzanine for women, offices, meeting rooms and a library. Educational programs are run by Imam Hassan Qazwini.

== See also ==
- Islam in Metro Detroit
- List of mosques in the United States
